= Digital artifactual value =

Intrinsic value of a digital object

Digital artifactual value, a preservation term, is the intrinsic value of a digital object, rather than the informational content of the object. Though standards are lacking, born-digital objects and digital representations of physical objects may have a value attributed to them as artifacts.

== Intrinsic value in analog materials ==
With respect to analog or non-digital materials, artifacts are determined to have singular research or archival value if they possess qualities and characteristics that make them the only acceptable form for long-term preservation. These qualities and characteristics are commonly referred to as the item's intrinsic value and form the basis upon which digital artifactual value is currently evaluated. Artifactual value based on this idea is predicated upon the artifact's originality, faithfulness, fixity, and stability. The intrinsic value of a particular object, as interpreted by archival professionals, largely determines the selection process for archives. The National Archives and Records Administration Committee on Intrinsic Value in "Intrinsic Value in Archival Material" classified an analog object as having intrinsic value if it possessed one or more of the follow qualities:

1. Physical form that may be the subject for study if the records provide meaningful documentation or significant examples of the form.
2. Aesthetic or artistic quality.
3. Unique or curious physical features.
4. Age that provides a quality of uniqueness.
5. Value for use in exhibits.
6. Questionable authenticity, date, author, or other characteristic that is significant and ascertainable by physical examination.
7. General and substantial public interest because of direct association with famous or historically significant people, places, things, issues or events.
8. Significance as documentation of the establishment or continuing legal basis of an agency or institution.
9. Significance as documentation of the formulation of policy at the highest executive levels when the policy has significance and broad effect throughout or beyond the agency or institution.

Other archival professionals such as Lynn Westney have written that the characteristics of materials exhibiting intrinsic value include age, content, usage, particularities of creation, signatures, and attached seals. Westney and others have stated that paper-based artifacts can be thought to have evidentiary value, or significant contextual markings, insofar that the original manifestation of the artifact can attest to the originality, faithfulness or authenticity, fixity, and stability of the content.

For other analog materials, properly articulating intrinsic value remains essential for determining artifactual value. Similar to paper-based objects in many respects, artifactual value for images typically takes into account artistic value, age, authorial prestige, significant provenance, and institutional priorities. Analog audio preservation is based upon similar factors, including the cultural value of the item, its historical uniqueness, the estimated longevity of the medium, the current condition of the item, and the state of playback equipment, among other things.

== Analog conventions in a digital realm ==
The standard definition of artifactual value, as it has applied to analog or non-digital materials in the twentieth century, is based upon a set of conventions which do not ordinarily apply to digital objects in toto. The Council on Library and Information Resources (CLIR) has stated that printed texts and other paper-based manuscripts, when considered as objects, are imbued with meaning distilled from a general set of understandings inherent to these conventions:

1. The object is of a fixed and stable composition/form.
2. Authorship and intellectual property are a recognizable concept.
3. Duplication is possible.
4. Fungibility of informational content (or, in other words, the ability to be replaced by another identical object).

These conventions are important to consider because they help to describe the physical and even metaphysical relationship between a document's content and its physical manifestation. The underpinnings of this relationship are not identical and do not apply with the same degree of clarity to an immaterial digital realm. The idea of fixity with regard to printed materials, for example, is largely predicated on the notion that an object has been recorded on a relatively stable medium. The physical presence of a print text serves as proof of its authenticity as an object or artifact, as well as its scarcity and uniqueness in relation to other print materials. Variations in the chemical properties and storage conditions of print-based materials, as well as other cultural variables, certainly impact the fixity or stability of print materials, but there is little controversy about determining its fundamental existence or originality.

However, uniqueness in the physical, paper-based sense does not translate to a digital realm in which immaterial objects are subject to theoretically infinite levels of reproduction and dissemination. Born-digital and digital surrogates may or may not look any different from each other on a server, and alterations can be made without explicit notice to the user. These alterations are normally called migration events, or actions taken on the digital object that change the original object's composition. They can enact subtle but fundamental alterations to the original document, thereby compromising its existence as an original object. Furthermore, because the tools used to generate and access digital objects have historically evolved quite rapidly, issues of playback obsolescence, incapability, data loss, and broken pathways to information have changed traditional ideas of fixity and stability. Therefore, artifactual value in a digital realm requires a modified set of generalized standards for determining artifactual originality.

Michael J. Giarlo and Ronald Jantz, only two of many, have posited a list of methods for establishing digital intrinsic value by way of careful metadata generation and records maintenance. In their report, a digital original possesses three key characteristics that distinguishes it from identical copies. These include continuous verification and re-verification of the document's digital signature starting from the date of creation; retaining versions and recordings of all changes to the object in an audit trail; and having the archival master contain the creation date of the digital object. They also reported that originality in digital sources could be verified or produced by the following techniques:

1. Digital object is given a date-time stamp that's automatically inserted into the METS-XML header upon creation.
2. Date-time is inserted into archival metadata.
3. Encapsulation.
4. Digital signatures.

== The role of digital surrogates ==
Digital surrogates are considered a utility for aiding in the preservation and increased access of certain artifacts. However, digital surrogates can have different utilities for objects depending on the nature of the original artifact and the condition the artifact is in. In 2001 the Council on Library and Information Resources (CLIR) published a report on the artifact in library collections. The CLIR states that the utility of the digital surrogate can be determined by dividing the original material (artifact) into two different categories, artifacts that are rare and those that are not. These two categories can be further divided by two categories, artifacts that are frequently used and those that are not.

=== Materials that are frequently used and not rare ===
According to the CLIR "it is not obvious that digital surrogates provide all the functionality, all the information, or all the aesthetic value of originals. Therefore, while it may be sensible to recommend that digital surrogates be used to reduce the cost and increase the availability of library holdings that circulate frequently, the decision to deaccession a physical object in library collections and replace it with a digital surrogate should be based on a careful assessment of the way in which library patrons use the original object or objects of its kind."

=== Materials that are infrequently used and not rare ===
Keeping the original is always the best solution for libraries and especially archives but in the case of libraries where an artifact is not rare or used infrequently there must be a barometer that is developed to help "balance functionality with actual use in order to help decide when digital surrogates that provide most of the functionality of originals are acceptable."

=== Materials that are rare and frequently used ===
A professional in the field of Library and Information Science (LIS) would almost certainly not argue that a digital surrogate could replace a rare object. However, in the case of a rare object that is falling into poor shape due to heavy use a digital surrogate could be extremely useful in reducing the wear and in the long run aid in preserving the artifact. A digital surrogate is not the ultimate end in preserving artifacts, but are very useful partners in the process.

=== Materials that are rare and infrequently used ===
For materials that are rare and infrequently used the idea of making a digital surrogate is often not viewed as a viable option, because digitization is so expensive. However, if the cost of housing the artifact becomes too burdensome making a digital surrogate might become a viable option. In some cases a library might even contemplate to deaccession the artifact once it is digitized. "Here again, libraries need to be aware of the actual or potential rarity of even those materials used infrequently today. Tomorrow, those may very well be the most valuable of artifacts, perhaps for users, or uses, that one could not predict today."

=== Evidential and intrinsic value of digital surrogates ===
Probably one of the biggest benefits that are expressed in all categories of digital surrogates is the increased access and potential increase of use due to ease of retrieving the artifact. Even though the digital surrogate might seem like a suitable replacement, the possibility of contextual loss (evidential value) needs to be seriously thought out before the inception of a mass digital surrogate project.

The digital surrogate can aid in preservation and helps increase access but they can lose valuable evidential value. According to Lynn Westney, digital surrogates do not have intrinsic value to make up for potential loss of evidential value. "The major risk posed by digital surrogates is the loss of evidential value due to the destruction of evidence as to the context and circumstances of their origin. Intrinsic value is lost when the testimony of the original is not completely preserved when converted to a different medium. It is based on features whose testimony is dependent on the form of the original and can therefore not be converted." Furthermore, Westney believes that with the increases in technology, and the availability to the public, it is very easy to manipulate and alter digital information and in turn losing the original authentic information perhaps permanently. It is harder to ensure the integrity of digital materials in this modern age. The problem of integrity must be considered when deciding to make digital surrogates or preserving born digital objects as integrity is key component to artifacts.

== Establishing value in the digital realm ==
Digital integrity can be classified as having artifactual value; however, as stated in Going Digital, this qualification varies and changes because of the nature of the medium and market. "The original document made available electronically is not necessarily what the viewer receives because of the strong influence of the equipment and software that both the recorder and the viewer happen to be using. Complicating the matter even further, equipment and software are subject to significant change in the short term and over time." A digital born object or a document that has migrated into a digital format can have artifactual value as long as the original software is linked with the document or image. If the software is updated or enhanced, the originality or integrity of the document or image is altered. Digital integrity's constancy fluctuates with the advancement of computer technologies. Certain documents and the partnering software may stay consistent for several years before an update trumps the current edition. This is a common viewpoint within the profession and one that reoccurs in this report.

The author's points stated in Going Digital is a proponent of the importance of congruity in software and content; however, in examining Preserving Digital Periodicals, the emphasis is on the text and especially in a specific format. "The core content of most periodicals is text. The text of a periodical or periodical article, however, can be created and maintained in a number of ways." The text and content of a digital document is the focus and importance whereas the presentational platform can be modified or changed completely. Since the platforms of digital records will be altered more than once throughout its course, the importance of the content becomes the artifactual value. Only time will tell as opinions and perceptions of artifactual value for digital content changes within the library profession.

=== Differing notions of artifactual value ===
Integrity of a digital surrogate is hindered even if the original is still available. "Only original documents contain intrinsic value although digital surrogates attempt to capture and convey it." The element of the originality is the key issue. When the original is gone and a replica remains, the document will not contain the same originality. Even though the replica is distorted the replica does represent the original which means value is associated with the document, but at a reduced rate. 'The simple thing to do would be to provide the best reproduction possible within our means and hope for approval...the original will be distorted by the process. Librarians need to be aware of the implications of enhancing one informational element while obscuring another, whatever the profile of these changes and the technical reasons for them may be.' This topic of artifactual value is one that has more scholarly research suggesting that digital records do not contain artifactual value; however, there are some views that oppose that particular line of thinking. Sources discussing digital integrity and digital artifactual value change, but most would agree that digital files can possess artifactual value even if that time frame is short.

Kenneth Thibodeau shares a good point and again follows to the comments made in Going Digital. "Preserving an object means keeping it intact, unchanged. Maintaining a digital object unchanged entails sustaining attributes and methods that bind the object to the technology originally used to create or capture it. Over time this binding will tend to raise greater and greater barriers to using state of the art technology to access to objects." Again the idea of digital artifactual value like software is ephemeral. The longevity of an original digital record and software is fleeting. Because there is money to be made in this field, computing professionals are striving to make updates and additions. Computing professional competition is straining the scholarly consideration for digital work in the library profession.

Lorna M. Hughes' definitive comments from the book Digitizing Collections explains that although a beneficial new medium digital born records have not been proven as a valid artifactual source:

Digitization of cultural heritage materials is changing the ways in which collections are used and accessed... Many factors will come into play when evaluating the 'value' of digital resources, but these factors may help in assessing when digitizing collections can be cost effective. Valuable digital resources, which will bring prestige to the institutions that create and maintain them, will be those that can support scholarship without any loss of the benefits of working with the originals. With no definitive evidence base to give concrete numbers about the economic value of digitization to an institution, assessing the value of digital resources is a question of also assessing whether digitization is also causing information to 'lose' some of its value: what is the loss to scholarship if electronic resources cannot be browsed in the same way as conventional library stacks?

Hughes' comments are important to note because even with the many benefits digitized material brings, presently there is a lack in statistical judgments regarding digital artifactual value. The author's tone and statement seem to leave the opinion open because viewpoints could very well change in the near future.

Reading the literature regarding digital archives with regard to the best strategies for implementation and how the records are then classified indicates concerns about jumping forward toward this new medium of digital. The digital medium is new and professionals are hesitant because of possible loss of information and not enough knowledge surrounding the topic. "The danger of provide a partial view of something that seems to be complete is just as alarming as that of decontextualization." From this point of view, it is clearly a demotion and an advisory to be careful. Another source follows the same cautious guidelines in Networking for Digital Preservation of a digital library in Germany. The attitude is more positive and suggests a tone of encouragement. Die Deutsche Bibliothek (DDB) is a library that has been digitizing information since 1998. Perhaps since the professional idea to digitize as a legitimate method of archiving is still new, examining the plan of the DDB sheds light on this notion. "Initially the thinking on future strategies was led by the idea of giving priority to safeguarding the content of a digital publication; however, keeping the 'original look and feel' of a document is now also considered to be an important aspect. Therefore, both approaches will be taken into account when drawing up preservation strategies." This comment is important because it shares a different perspective of how the profession deals with digital material. As opposed to shutting down the opportunity to enhance digital medium in the profession like the above example, the DDB is taking an active approach to working with digital material.

The text from Mark Bide's publication from "The ebook Revolution" supports this movement."If ebooks become a significant medium for the consumption of backlist titles, it can only be a matter of time before market demand drives publishers in the direction of publishing their frontlist in ebook formats. 'Ebook-only' publishing may currently be largely confined to what many dismiss as an enhanced form of vanity publishing in the US; this is unlikely to remain the case for long...libraries cannot afford to ignore developments in ebook publishing." Thus, ebooks relate to artifactual value with a focus on economic value. Because there is a demand within the market for this media, the pricing and importance increases. Bide's report is a fortuitous one. The marketplace has called for this medium regardless of the significance of its content. It is deemed as important because its creation has established a new level within the digital medium that could develop into the norm by the end of this decade.

From "The Need to Archive Blog Content", this article discusses the advent of legitimate blogs that professional journalists and newspapers cite for genuine information. Because creators of blogs and social media have the ability to edit or delete postings or the entire content at the creator's will. This author has concerns about the editing, "but will anyone be able to see the actual blog entries? Will these primary source documents be available?" Here is a comment made in the article concerning the longevity of a news source and how it has both potential and danger in being totally unavailable once the information has passed its initial interest level: "Since the "Daily Nightly" blog is not archived anywhere other than the MSNBC site, there is no guarantee that future generations will have access to these posts, considered by traditional media to be insightful and helpful for understanding part of the news process." The author describes possible answers to archiving blogs; however, the points align themselves with artifactual value concerns within this medium. The premise is structured around truth, validity and authenticity along with proper linking methods to accredited sources so that this form of communication and information does not go undetected. "Trust is of fundamental importance in digital document management," this is an important part of establishing value to this type of sites. As more and more accredited news sources cite blogs and other traditional transient sites, the term of artifactual value will be linked to blogs and social media.

== Standards for establishing value ==
Currently, there are no widely held standards for what constitutes artifactual value for digital objects. Nonetheless, professionals working in digital curation and preservation have made several attempts to establish guidelines for defining the authenticity and value of digital objects.

=== Task Force on Archiving of Digital Information ===
As early as 1995, the Task Force on Archiving of Digital Information made efforts to define the attributes of a digital object that distinguish it as a whole and singular work. These attributes include a digital object's content, fixity, reference, provenance, and context.

=== National Archives and Records Administration ===
The United States National Archives and Records Administration (NARA) has also suggested several criteria for establishing value for digital objects, specifically for Web 2.0 records, in a 2010 report. The report, while not official NARA policy, suggests that the contextual value of a digital object, such as its functionality, layout, and metadata, contributes to the informational content of the object. According to the NARA report, changing or removing properties of a digital object, such as its appearance or format, may affect the digital object's artifactual value.

=== Council on Library and Information Resources ===
The Council on Library and Information Resources (CLIR) has also contributed guidelines for establishing a digital object's artifactual value. The 2001 CLIR report, "The Evidence in Hand: Report of the Task Force on the Artifact in Library Collections" states that successful preservation of a digital artifact is measured by the degree to which an object's "chief distinctions" are maintained over time. This includes attributes such as functionality, formatting, or whatever else is primarily important for a particular user community or use environment.

In a 1998 publication, CLIR indicates that retaining an original digital object may not, in fact, mean retaining the original medium. Given rapid changes in technology, most mediums for digital objects quickly decay or become obsolete. Rather, the CLIR 1998 report suggests that preserving a digital artifact should mean retaining the "functionality, look, and feel of the original "object".

== Value in new media art ==
New media art that is born-digital has intrinsic value that may exist in only digital form. Preserving the digital artifactual value of new media art is usually done with preservation strategies such as emulation and data migration.

== See also ==
- Data archaeology
- Database preservation
- Digital asset management
- Data format management
- Digital obsolescence
- Digital reformatting
- Enterprise content management
- File format
- Information lifecycle management
- List of digital preservation initiatives
- New media art preservation
- Preservation metadata
- Universal Virtual Computer
- Virtual artifact
- Web archiving
