= Enumerate =

Enumerate could refer to:

- Enumeration, a mathematical, theoretical concept of an exhaustive listing of compatible items
- Enumerate (project), a collaborative research project about digitization of cultural heritage
- Enumerated type in computer programming
