= Perpetual access =

Perpetual access is the stated continuous access of licensed electronic material after it is no longer accessible through an active paid subscription either through the library or publisher action. In many cases, the two parties involved in the license agree that it is necessary for the license to retain access to these materials after the license has lapsed. Other terms for perpetual access or similar trains of thought are 'post-cancellation access' and 'continuing access.'

In the licensing of software products, a perpetual license means that a software application is sold on a one-time basis and the licensee can then use a copy of the software forever. The license holder has indefinite access to a specific version of a software program by paying for it only once.

Perpetual access is a term that is used within the library community to describe the ability to retain access to electronic journals after the contractual agreement for these materials has passed. Typically when a library licenses access to an electronic journal, the journal's content remains in the possession of the licensor. The library often purchases the rights to all back issues as well as new issues. When the license expires, access to all the journal's contents is lost. In a typical print model, the library purchases the journals and retains them for the duration of the contract but also after the contract expires. In order to retain access to journals that were released during the term of a license for digital electronic journals, the library must obtain perpetual access rights.

The ability to maintain perpetual access can be seen in the shift from print to electronic material, as apparent in both user demand and advantages of non-print material. Electronic materials rely on a relationship between library and publisher, with a distinct dynamic over the publisher's control of the licensed material. This in turn causes issues when the paid for subscription with a publisher ends and the use of the material is now uncertain or there is the inability to share that material. With the shift from physical print material to that of electronic material, the legality of what it means to own a purchase is an issue. The concept of first-sale doctrine that formerly allowed more lenient access and use of physical print material is no longer applicable with electronic material due to past legal precedent. This essentially points to the issue that “for libraries, this means that legal ownership of individual titles, the storage unit (often a piece of hardware or software), and the ability to maintain files for future use are tied to the content provider-often a publisher or software developer.”

Perpetual access is closely related to digital archiving, which is the preservation of electronic documents. However, archiving rights are "the right to permanently retain an electronic copy of the licensed materials.” Perpetual access rights focus on continual access, and archiving rights focus on continual access and how one receives continual access. Often, if an institution is to retain perpetual access, it must design a way in which to preserve the electronic documents that are granted by the license. Several initiatives have developed methods in which to retain electronic documents and retain perpetual access. The most notable of these are the LOCKSS program and the Ithaka Portico program.

== Concerns ==
With license agreements for perpetual access, communication between publishers and libraries is a large part of this process, as agreement terms and policy understanding are not always clear. Licensing agreements do not always include perpetual access. In addition to this, because of the complexity involving perpetual access, libraries may find the choice to use electronic material with no understanding of how it may be used when access is gone, as it may be the only option available.

Link rot, negligence or denial of domain renewal, or closing of information source are some examples of technical issues that directly effect the ability to maintain perpetual access. Issues like these for both perpetual access and with digital preservation have garnered some more recent attention through single discipline efforts or government level. One example is the Keepers Registry, which equips libraries with resources to help them navigate perpetual access and digital preservation topics as a whole. Despite the cost effectiveness of utilizing electronic material in place of print, the cost of maintaining that electronic material is a hindrance on the other end of the spectrum for a library's ability to opt for and maintain perpetual access, both in terms of time and staffing limitations. This in turn creates a barrier in the need for continuous efforts by libraries to maintain and monitor the materials if perpetual access beyond the sole act of perpetual access being granted.

Trigger events are also another concern for libraries and the option for perpetual access capabilities. These events can be when electronic material is no longer accessible for six months or longer. One example of a trigger event is the case when access to the information made available is lost due to a natural event.

== Related initiatives ==
Several initiatives have developed methods in which to retain electronic documents and retain perpetual access. The most notable of these are the LOCKSS program, the CLOCKSS (Controlled LOCKSS), and the Ithaka Portico program.

== See also ==
- Digital preservation
- Software license
