= Born-digital =

Materials that originate in a digital form

The term born-digital refers to materials that originate in a digital form. This is in contrast to digital reformatting, through which analog materials become digital, as in the case of files created by scanning physical paper records. It is most often used in relation to digital libraries and the issues that go along with said organizations, such as digital preservation and intellectual property. However, as technologies have advanced and spread, the concept of being born-digital has also been discussed in relation to personal consumer-based sectors, with the rise of e-books and evolving digital music. Other terms that might be encountered as synonymous include "natively digital", "digital-first", and "digital-exclusive".

== Discrepancies in definition ==
There exists some inconsistency in defining born-digital materials. Some believe such materials must exist in digital form exclusively; in other words, if they can be transferred into a physical, analog form, they are not truly born-digital. However, others maintain that while these materials will often not have a subsequent physical counterpart, having one does not bar them from being classified as 'born-digital'. For instance, Mahesh and Mittal identify two types of born-digital content, "exclusive digital" and "digital for print", allowing for a broader base of classification than the former definition provides.

Furthermore, it has been pointed out that certain works may incorporate components that are both born-digital and digitized, further blurring the lines between what should and should not be considered 'born-digital.' For example, a digital video created may utilize historical film footage that has been converted. It is important to be aware of these discrepancies when thinking about born-digital materials and the effects they have. However, some universals do exist across these definitions. All make clear the fact that born-digital media must originate digitally. Also, they agree that this media must be able to be utilized in a digital form (whether exclusively or otherwise), while they do not have to exist or be used as analog materials.

== Etymology ==
The term "born digital" is of uncertain origin. While it may have occurred to multiple people at various times, it was coined independently by web developer Randel (Rafi) Metz in 1993, who acquired the domain name "borndigital.com" then and sustained it as a personal website for 18 years until 2011. The domain is now owned by a web developer in New Zealand. The original website is archived here.

== Examples of born-digital content ==
=== Grey literature and communications ===
Much of the grey literature that exists today are almost entirely conducted online, due in part to the accessibility and speed of internet communications. As the products of the vast amount of information created by organizations and individuals on computers, data sets and electronic records must exist in the context of other activities. Common content includes:

- Email
- Documents created in word processors and/or observed in viewers. Examples include Microsoft Word, Google Docs, WordPerfect, Apple Pages, LibreOffice Writer, and Adobe Reader.
- Spreadsheets used to organize and tabulate data are almost entirely digital. Common applications include Microsoft Excel, Google Sheets, LibreOffice Calc, and Lotus 1-2-3 (discontinued).
- Presentations used to present data and ideas are created with software such as Microsoft PowerPoint, Google Slides, LibreOffice Impress, and Prezi.
- Electronic medical records
- Social media websites such as Facebook, Twitter, and Reddit have originated in the networked world, and are therefore born-digital by default.
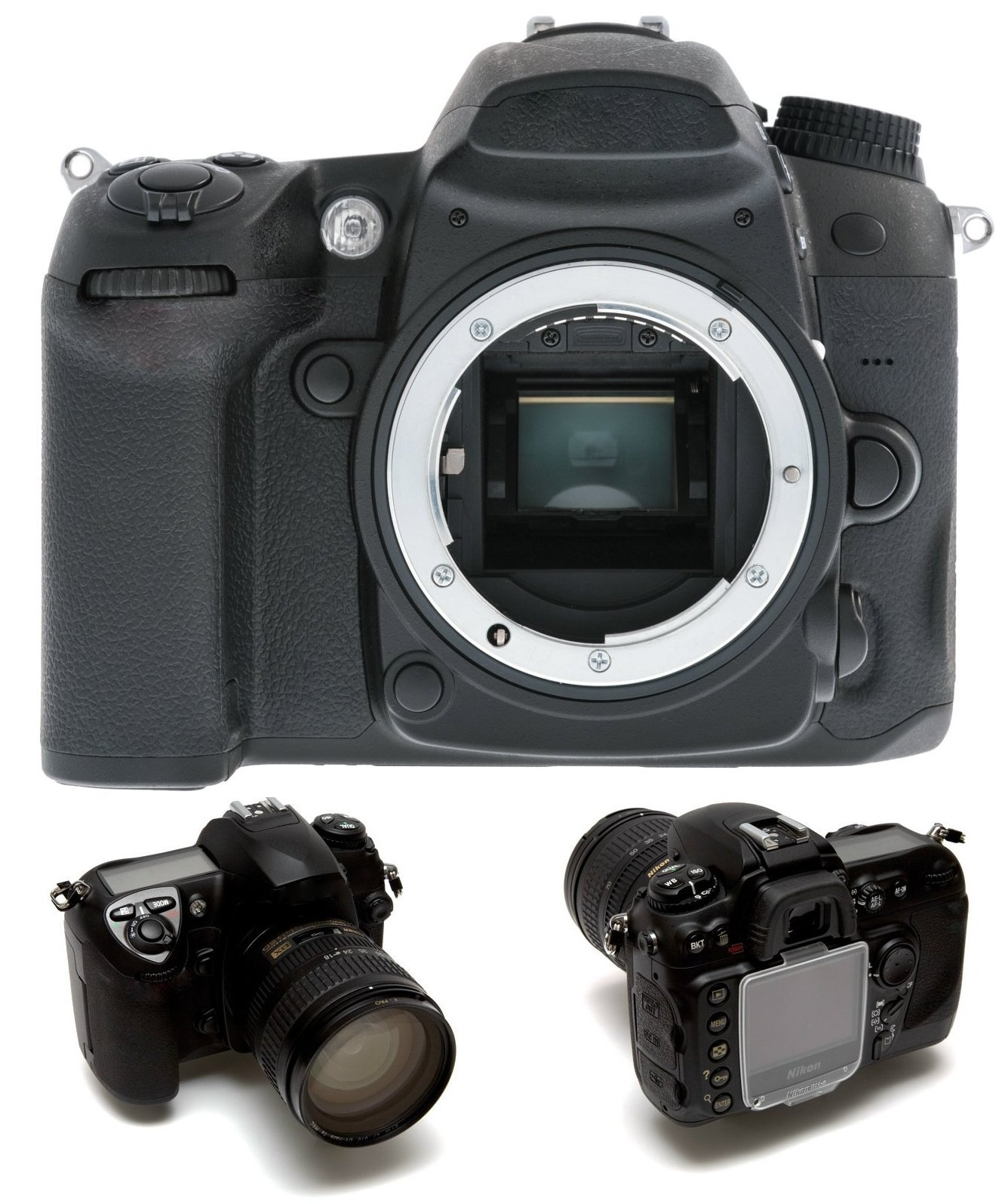
  A digital camera

==== Digital photography ====
Digital photography has allowed larger groups of people to participate in the process, art form, and pastime of photography. With the advent of digital cameras in the late 1980s, followed by the invention and dissemination of mobile phones capable of photography, sales of digital cameras eventually surpassed that of analog cameras. The early to mid 2000s saw the rise of photo storage websites, such as Flickr and Photobucket, and social media websites dedicated primarily to sharing digital photographs, including Instagram, Pinterest, Imgur, and Tumblr. Digital image files include Joint Photographic Experts Group (JPEG), Tagged Image File Format (TIFF), Portable Network Graphics (PNG), Graphic Interchange Format (GIF), and raw image format.

Adobe Illustrator is a widely used graphic design and illustration software.

==== Digital art ====
Digital art is an umbrella term for art created with a computer. Types include visual media, digital animation, computer-aided design, 3D models and interactive art. Webcomics, comics published primarily on the internet, are an example of exclusively born-digital art. Webcomics follow the tradition of user-generated content and may later be printed by the creator, but as they were originally disseminated through the internet, they are considered to be born-digital media. Many webcomics are published on existing social media websites, while others use webcomic-specific platforms, such as Webtoon, or their own domains.

==== Electronic books ====
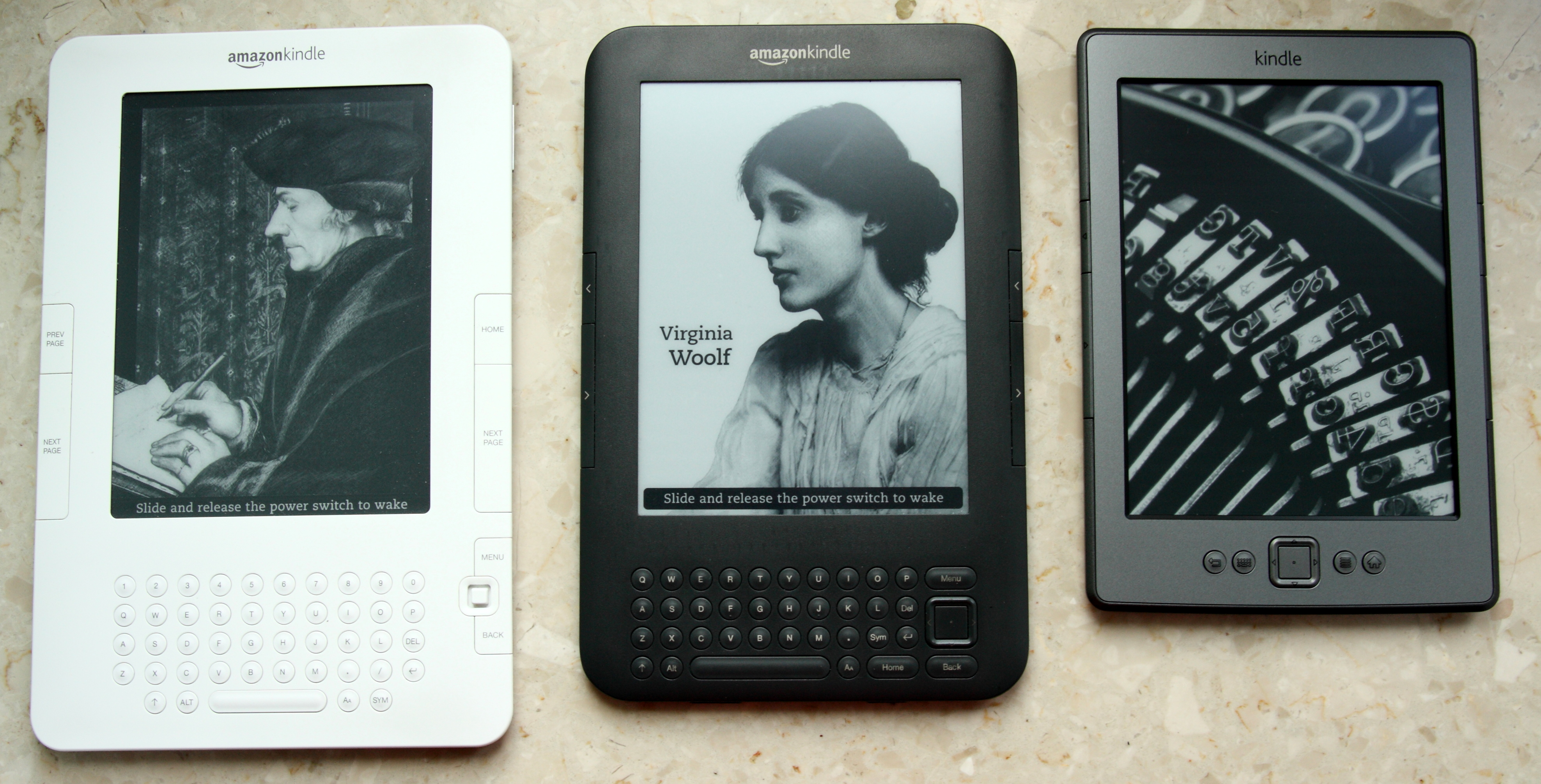
Different generations of the Amazon Kindle, an e-reader device

E-books are books that can be read through the digital screens of computers, smartphones, or dedicated devices. The e-book sector of the book industry has flourished in recent years, with increasing numbers of e-books and e-book readers being developed and sold. E-publishing is particularly favorable to independent authors, because the digital marketplace creates a more direct connection between authors, their works, and the audience. Some publishing houses, including major ones such as Harlequin, have formed imprints for digital-only books in response to this trend. Publishers also offer digital-exclusive publications for use on e-book readers, such as the Kindle. One example of this was with the simultaneous launch of Amazon's Kindle 2 with the Stephen King novelette Ur. In recent years, however, the sale of e-books from traditional publishers has decreased, due in part to increasing prices.

==== Video recordings ====
Videos that are born-digital vary in type and usage. Vlogs, an amalgamation of "video" and "blog," are streamed and consumed on video-sharing websites such as YouTube.

Similarly, a web series is a television-like show that is shown exclusively and/or initially on the internet. This does not include the streaming of pre-existing traditional television shows. Examples include Dr. Horrible's Sing Along Blog, The Lizzie Bennett Diaries, The Guild, and The Twilight Zone (2019).

==== Sound recordings ====
Digital sound recordings have played a role since the 1970s with the acceptance of pulse-code modulation (PCM) in the recording process. Since then, numerous means of storing and delivering digital audio have been developed, including web streams, compact discs and mp3 audio files. Increasingly, digital audio are only available via download, lacking any kind of tangible counterpart. One example of this trend is the 2008 recording of Hector Berlioz's Symphonie fantastique by Los Angeles Philharmonic under Gustavo Dudamel. Available through download only, it has presented problems for libraries which may want to carry this work but cannot due to licensing limitations. Another example is Radiohead's 2007 release In Rainbows, released initially as a digital download, before later receiving a physical release.

==== Other media ====
WebExhibits are websites that act as virtual museums for any variety of content. These often use both primary and secondary historical sources, maps, timelines, infographics, and other data visualizations to showcase the historical past. One example is Clio Visualizing History's Click! The Ongoing Feminist Revolution, a web exhibit about the American women's movement from the 1940s to the present. Clio Visualizing History was founded by Lola Van Wagenen in 1996 to meet the growing need for innovative history projects in multi-media platforms.

=== Journalism ===
As existing print publications migrated to born-digital releases, digital native news websites such as HuffPo and Buzzfeed News have grown substantially. This trend toward web-exclusive content has seen the rise of "news applications," or news articles built with interactive features that cannot be replicated on print. "News Apps" are often heavily data-driven, using interactive graphics custom-built for the story by a team of software specialists in addition to the core group of writers and editors. Examples include Baltimore Homicides from The Baltimore Sun, Do No Harm from the Las Vegas Sun, and Snow Fall from The New York Times, which took a team of more than fifteen journalists, web developers, and designers to build.

== Key issues ==
=== Preservation ===
Digital preservation involves the conservation and maintenance of digital content. As with other digital objects, preservation must be a continuous and regular undertaking, as these materials do not show the same signs of degradation that print and other physical materials do. Invisible processes such as bit rot can lead to irreparable damage. In the case of born-digital content, deterioration can occur in the form of bit rot, a process in which digital files degrade over time, and link rot, a process in which URLs link to pages on the internet that are no longer available. Incompatibility is also a concern, in regard to the eventual obsolescence of both hardware and software capable of making sense of the documents.

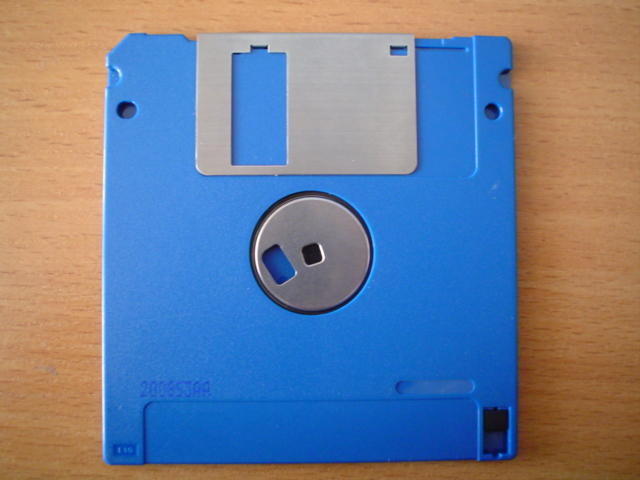
A floppy disk requires obsolete technology in order to read its stored content.

Many questions arise regarding what should be archived and preserved and who should undertake the job. Vast amounts of born-digital content are created constantly and institutions are forced to decide what and how much should be saved. Because linking plays such a large role in the digital setting, whether a responsibility exists to maintain access to links (and therefore context) is debated, especially when considering the scope of such a task. Additionally, since publishing is not as delineated in the digital realm and preliminary versions of work are increasingly made available, knowing when to archive presents further complications.

=== Relevance and accessibility ===
For digital libraries and repositories that are used as reference materials, such as PBS LearningMedia, which provides educational resources for teachers, staying relevance is of utmost importance. The information must be factually accurate and include context, while staying current to the website's main goals. As in the case of preservation, bit rot, link rot, and incompatibility negatively affect how users might access born-digital records, while mere functionality, e.g. video quality and legibility of any text, is also a concern. Additionally, considerations on how digital content can be inclusive of people with disabilities should be made, particularly in conjunction with assistive technologies such as screen readers, screen magnifiers, and speech-to-text software. Access is also affected by licensing laws — the lack of ownership of their digital collections leaves libraries with nothing when their license expires, despite the costs already paid.

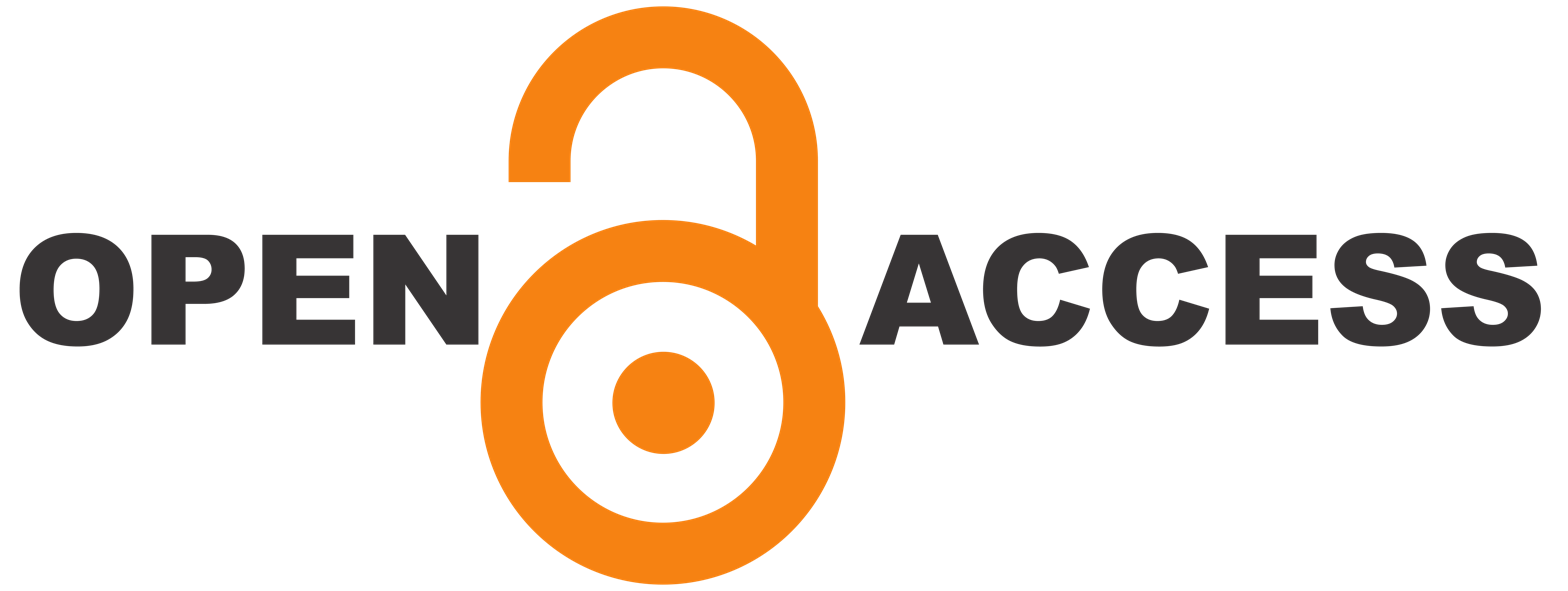
Open Access logo, designed by the Public Library of Science

=== Licensing ===
Laws created to protect the intellectual property were written for analog works; as such, provisions such as the first-sale doctrine of US copyright law, which enables libraries to lend materials to patrons, have not been applied to the digital realm. Therefore, certain copyrighted digital content that is licensed rather than owned, as is common with many digital materials, is often of limited use since it cannot be transmitted to patrons at various computers or lent through an interloan agreement. However, with regards to the preservation functions of libraries and archives and the subsequent need to make copies of born-digital materials, the laws of many countries have been changing, allowing for agreements to be made between these institutions and the rights holders of born-digital content.

Consumers have also had to deal with intellectual property as it concerns their ownership of and ability to control the born-digital material that they buy. Piracy proves to be a bigger problem with digital objects, including those that are born-digital, because such materials can be copied and spread in perfect condition with speed and distance on a scale inconceivable for traditional print and physical materials. Again, the first-sale doctrine, which, from a consumer standpoint, allows purchasers of materials to sell or give away items (such as books and CDs), is not yet applied effectively to digital objects. Three reasons for this have been identified by Victor Calaba: "...first, license agreements imposed by software manufacturers typically prohibit exercise of the first sale doctrine; second, traditional copyright law may not support application of the first sale doctrine to digital works; finally, the Digital Millennium Copyright Act functionally prevents users from making copies of digitized works and prohibits the necessary bypassing of access control mechanisms to facilitate a transfer."

Increasingly, institutions are more interested in subscribing to digital versions of journals, something observed as some scholarly journals have unbundled their print and electronic editions and allowed for separate subscription; these trends have created questions about the economic sustainability of print publication. Major journals such as the American Chemical Society have made significant changes to their print editions in order to cut costs, and many others predict an exclusively digital future. The increasing subscription prices and predatory practices of scholarly journals, however, provided impetus for the Open Access Movement, which advocates for free, unrestricted access to scholarly papers.

== See also ==
- e-Flux
- Digital artifactual value
- Digital curation
- Legal deposit
- National edeposit, Australia's system for depositing, storing and managing all born-digital documents published in Australia
- Virtual artifact
