= Margaret Hedstrom =

Margaret L. Hedstrom
- Born: 1953 (age 72–73)
- Known for: Electronic records preservation, CAMiLEON project, SEAD project
- Awards: Library of Congress Digital Preservation Pioneer (2008), University of Michigan Distinguished Scholarly Achievement, Society of American Archivists Distinguished Fellow (1992)

Academic background
- Education: University of Wisconsin–Madison

Academic work
- Discipline: Archivist
- Institutions: University of Michigan School of Information

Margaret L. Hedstrom is an American archivist who is professor emerita of information at the University of Michigan School of Information. She has contributed to the fields of digital preservation, archives, and electronic records management.

Hedstrom led the National Science Foundation-funded Sustainable Environment through Actionable Data (SEAD) project, which worked to "develop a system whereby sustainability scientists can manage and share their data." Hedstrom led the CAMiLEON project, which was conducted jointly with the University of Leeds and funded by the National Science Foundation and Jisc, and investigated the use of emulation tools as part of a strategy for long-term preservation of digital records. Her research interests include digital preservation strategies as well as cultural preservation and outreach in developing countries. She has also been a consultant to government archival programs, the World Bank, and the International Council on Archives. She has served on doctoral committees at the State University of New York at Albany, the University of Pittsburgh, and the University of Michigan.

== Biography ==
From 1985 to 1987, Hedstrom worked at the New York State Archives as Director of the Special Media Records Project; in 1987 she became their Chief of the Bureau of Records Analysis and Disposition (later State Records Advisory Services), and in 1989 she founded their Center for Electronic Records, staying with the archives until 1995. She earned master's degrees in library science (1977) and history (1979) and a PhD in History (1988), all from the University of Wisconsin–Madison.

Hedstrom conducted research on the management and preservation of electronic records for nearly 20 years, beginning at the Wisconsin Historical Society (1979–83). She was a principal planner of a major conference on electronic records research held in 1991.

She has shaped research in digital preservation, beginning with her 1991 article "Understanding Electronic Incunabula". In addressing continuing education needs on electronic records, Hedstrom argued for the importance of ensuring that postgraduate education emphasized core archival concepts.

She was a main author of It's About Time: Research Challenges in Digital Archiving and Long-Term Preservation (2003), sponsored by the National Science Foundation Directorate for Computing and Information Sciences and Engineering's Digital Government Program and Digital Libraries Program and the Library of Congress' National Digital Information Infrastructure and Preservation Program.

In 2002-03, she was part of the Working Group on Digital Archiving and Preservation, which was co-sponsored by the National Science Foundation and by the European Union through the DELOS Network of Excellence on Digital Libraries. She co-authored the report Invest to Save: Report and Recommendations of the NSF-DELOS Working Group on Digital Archiving and Preservation (2003).

== Awards and honors ==
In 1989, she was the first recipient of the New York State Forum for Information Resource Management's annual Award for Excellence in New York State Government Information Services. Hedstrom was named as a fellow of the Society of American Archivists in 1992. In 2008, the Library of Congress recognized Hedstrom as a Digital Preservation Pioneer. She received the University of Michigan's Distinguished Scholarly Achievement Award for her work at the University of Fort Hare in South Africa.
