= File fixity =

File fixity is a digital preservation term referring to the property of a digital file being fixed, or unchanged. Fixity checking is the process of verifying that a digital object has not been altered or corrupted. During transfer, a repository may run a fixity check to ensure a transmitted file has not been altered en route. Within the repository, fixity checking is used to ensure that digital files have not been affected by data rot, or other digital preservation dangers. By itself, fixity checking does not ensure the preservation of a digital file. Instead, it allows a repository to identify which corrupted files to replace with a clean copy from the producer or from a backup.

In practice, a fixity check is most often accomplished by computing checksum or cryptographic hash function values for a file and comparing them to a stored value or through digital signatures. File fixity figures prominently in Preservation Metadata: Implementation Strategies (PREMIS), the Government Printing Office's work on the Authenticity of Electronic Federal Government Publications, and fixity checking practices are used by a range of cultural heritage organizations.
