= Section 108 Study Group =

United States work group on the US Copyright Act

The Section 108 Study Group was a select committee of copyright experts and library and archives professionals, convened by the United States Copyright Office and the Library of Congress's National Digital Information Infrastructure and Preservation Program (NDIIPP). The Study Group was charged with updating Section 108 of the United States Copyright Act—relating to libraries and archives' ability to make copies of copyrighted works available under certain circumstances—for the digital age. The Study Group issued a final report in March 2008, outlining proposed changes and updates to Section 108.

== Background ==
Section 108 of Title 17 of the United States Copyright Act, initially enacted in 1976, allows libraries and archives to "make certain uses of copyrighted materials in order to serve the public and ensure the availability of works over time". These uses include making copies of materials under copyright in order to ensure accessibility to patrons, and to replace or preserve at-risk materials. The principle behind Section 108 dates back to the 1930s, when an informal "Gentleman's Agreement" allowed researchers to obtain a single copy of a specific work from a library or archive if they stated in writing that they would only use the copy for research purposes. The American Library Association issued additional guidance based on ideas from the Gentleman's Agreement including the Materials and Reproduction Code in 1941, discussing photocopying for library use and the General Interlibrary Loan Code in 1952, outlining copy requests for interlibrary use. The introduction of high-speed copying in the 1960s changed the nature of the conversation around availability of copies, as it suddenly became possible to produce many more copies much more quickly; this led to a reevaluation of reproductions of copyrighted materials, and ultimately the adoption of Section 108 in 1976.

The rise of digital technologies has provoked a similar revolution in how copyrighted works are reproduced and distributed. However, despite minor changes made as a result of the Digital Millennium Copyright Act (1998), Section 108 has not been updated to reflect the challenges that digital technology poses to both libraries and archives and copyright holders.

== The Study Group ==
The Copyright Office and the NDIIPP convened the Section 108 Study Group in 2005. The group was tasked with deciding how best to update Section 108 in light of the emergence of digital technologies, and to present its findings to the Librarian of Congress by mid-2006. The group was composed of nineteen members, with membership split close to evenly between copyright experts and library and archives professionals, and was co-chaired by Laura N. Gasaway, a former president of the American Association of Law Libraries, and Richard S. Rudick, the vice-president of the International Publishers Association. The Study Group held three public roundtables for people in fields related to libraries or copyright law to weigh in on proposed changes. These took place on March 8, 2006, in Los Angeles; March 16, 2006, in Washington, D.C.; and January 31, 2007, in Chicago. Additionally, the group held nineteen closed-door meetings between April 2005 and January 2008. The Study Group released their report in March 2008. The report provided a series of recommendations for updating Section 108. These included:

- Expanding Section 108 eligibility to include museums.
- Allowing institutions to make copies of at-risk copyrighted works in the interests of preservation.
- Allowing institutions to capture and preserve online content that has been made publicly available.
- Allowing institutions to make view-only copies of television news programs available online.
- Reorganizing the text of Section 108 in a more logical and clearly understandable manner.

However, the Study Group failed to reach a consensus on other issues related to Section 108, including whether to eliminate the exclusion on non-text materials such as audiovisual, pictorial, or graphic works.

== Outcomes ==
Following the publication of the Study Group's report, the Copyright Office continued to review the issues associated with Section 108. On April 2, 2014, the House Subcommittee on Courts, Intellectual Property, and the Internet held a hearing on preservation and reuse of copyright, including Section 108; witnesses at the hearing disagreed over whether updating Section 108 was practical or even necessary.

A new review of Section 108 began in the summer of 2016. In response to a draft revision to Section 108, the Society of American Archivists (SAA) issued a statement to the effect that the SAA did not consider Section 108 to need reform, and that the Study Group's report, now over eight years old, had become obsolete in light of legal and technological changes since its publication.

In September 2017, the Copyright Office published a discussion document on Section 108 in "an effort to facilitate a final resolution of this topic". The discussion document restated the belief that Section 108 should be updated to reflect changes in technology, outlined the current proposals for updates, and laid out model statutory language for future discussions of the subject.
