= Petit Tube =

French website

- Website type: Entertainment
- Owner: Yann van der Cruyssen
- Creator: Yann van der Cruyssen
- Website: petittube.com
- Launched: May 19, 2011; 15 years ago

Petit Tube is a French website that searches through an algorithm for unwatched YouTube videos and displays them on the website, cycling through content to display and allowing people to view videos that would have otherwise been seen by little or none. The website was launched in 2011. Its founder is Yann van der Cruyssen, a French digital artist.

Below the video, there were options allowing viewers to vote on videos, Cette vidéo est bien (This video is good) and Cette vidéo n'est pas bien (This video is not good).
