= Write Once Read Forever =

Data storage method

W.O.R.F.
- Write Once, Read Forever
- Example of one possible WORF slide illustrating data, human readable microtext, indexing codes, a full-spectrum color image, and instructions for building a reader and decoding the data. WORF media is agnostic.
- Abbreviation: WORF
- Status: Published
- Organization: Creative Technology
- Committee: Richard Solomon, Eric Rosenthal, Jonathan Smith, Clark Johnson, Melitte Buchman
- Domain: archival digital storage
- Website: creative-technology.net

Write Once Read Forever (WORF) is a data storage method which allows users to write data once and allows storage of the users data without ever being refreshed. This differs from common digital storage techniques such as drives that need to be re-written often to prevent loss or corruption of data. WORF was tested on the International Space Station in 2019.

== Method ==
WORF uses a data storage mechanism based on silver halide, which after substantial testing has been determined to last for more than a century under conventional ambient environmental conditions. WORF digital data is stored as microscopic, metallic, interference-created standing waves (representing narrowband ‟colors” ) embedded in a modern, super-resolution, dye-free, photosensitive emulsion. Wavelengths encode multiple superimposed states allowing complex data permutations to be stored per data region. Permutations enable extremely high data density to be stored on WORF media. Multi-state data architecture within each domain also enhances data integrity, error-checking, and accelerates parallel writing and reading for the entire media module. Once data is written to WORF, energy is needed only for reading—no periodic refresh is necessary, and data is both immutable and truly permanent. Human readable text and images are embedded in the WORF module adjacent to the digital data. This text and imagery contain meta- information about the media's content, and instructions for decoding for future generations.

== NASA experiment ==
WORF payload was delivered and docked to the International Space Station (ISS) via SpaceX CRS-17 on May 9, 2019. NASA's ISS test will determine if WORF media can survive a hostile space environment during long-term space missions, such as Lunar, Mars missions, and beyond. The WORF media payload will stay on the ISS for up to one year.

Due to a previous NASA mission already named WORF, NASA renamed the experiment HELIOS (Hardened Extremely Long Life Information Optical Storage). The HELIOS mission returned to Earth and was deemed a success with the stored data showing no significant decay after six months of space conditions and solar radiation. WORF technology for the HELIOS experiment uses a proven archival media, redesigned, re-purposed and patented by CTech to store digital data for long periods, measured in decades and possibly centuries.
