= Enumerate (project) =

ENUMERATE
- Mission statement: "To create a reliable baseline of statistical data about digitization, digital preservation and online access to cultural heritage in Europe".
- Commercial?: No
- Type of project: Aggregation and analysis of statistical information
- Location: Europe
- Owner: Collaboration led by Collections Trust
- Established: February 2011
- Website: www.enumerate.eu

ENUMERATE is a collaborative project, led by Collections Trust in the United Kingdom and funded by the European Commission, to create "a reliable baseline of statistical data about digitization, digital preservation and online access to cultural heritage in Europe".

Cultural institutions increasingly use digital media to disseminate their heritage material. To obtain a useful overview of the current state, a precursor NUMERIC project to gather statistics was carried out between 2007 and 2009.

Three reports have been published under the auspices of ENUMERATE. The first ENUMERATE Core survey report was published in May 2012. In 2013 a report on the ENUMERATE Thematic Surveys on Digital Collections in European Cultural Heritage Institutions was published. The second ENUMERATE Core survey report was published in January 2014.

== Formal partners ==
The partners of the ENUMERATE EC-funded project, collectively known as the ENUMERATE network, are:

- Collections Trust, UK (project coordinator);
- Digitaal Erfgoed Nederland (DEN), Netherlands;
- Stiftung Preußischer Kulturbesitz, Germany;
- Digibís, Spain;
- FARO Vlaams Steunpunt voor Cultureel Erfgoed, Belgium;
- Ministère de la Culture et de la Communication, France;
- Österreichische Nationalbibliothek, Austria;
- Narodna in univerzitetna knjižnica (National and University Library), Slovenia;
- Országos Széchényi Könyvtár (OSZK; National Széchényi Library), Hungary;
- The European Library (hosted by the Koninklijke Bibliotheek, Netherlands).
