= Darken (disambiguation) =

Darken may refer to:

- Lawrence Stamper Darken (1909–1978), American physical chemist and metallurgist
- Rob Darken (born 1969), Polish heavy metal singer
- Eric Darken, American percussionist, composer, and programmer
- Darken, a 2017 Canadian film
- Darken Rahl, character from Terry Goodkind's The Sword of Truth series

== See also ==
- Dark (disambiguation)
- Darkening (disambiguation)
- Darker (disambiguation)
- Darkness (disambiguation)
