= Darkening =

Darkening may refer to:

- Darkening (ophthalmology), vision loss or weakness that occurs without an apparent lesion affecting the eye
- Darkening of Tristram, an event taking place prior and during Diablo, during which the main antagonist Diablo tried to break free of his imprisonment and laid siege to the town of Tristram. It is also the name of the time-limited event in Diablo III that marks the anniversary of the first game's original release.
- Darkening of Valinor, the destruction of the Two Trees of Valinor in the fictional universe of J. R. R. Tolkien's Middle-earth
- Gravity darkening, an astronomical phenomenon
- Hydrogen darkening, a physical degradation of the optical properties of glass
- Limb darkening, the diminishing of intensity in the image of a star as one moves from the center to the edge

== See also ==
- Dark (disambiguation)
- Darken (disambiguation)
- Darker (disambiguation)
- Darkness (disambiguation)
- Lighting
