= Nokia 101 =

Nokia 101 may be:

- Nokia 101 (1992)
- Nokia 101 (2011)
