= Darkness (disambiguation) =

Darkness is the absence of light.

Darkness or The Darkness may also refer to:

== Film and television ==
=== Characters and concepts ===
- Darkness, a character from the film Legend (1985)
- The Darkness, a name for one of the man-eating lions in The Ghost and the Darkness (1996), a historical adventure film
- The Darkness, the source of destruction of Wonderland in the animated film Wonder Park
- The Darkness (Supernatural), known as Amara in human form, a dark evil in the eleventh season of Supernatural

=== Film ===
- Darkness (1916 film), an Italian silent film
- Darkness (1923 film), a British silent crime film
- Darkness (1993 film), an American independent horror film
- Darkness (2002 film), an English-language horror film
- Darkness, a 2009 Czech film directed by Juraj Herz
- Darkness (2015 film), a Serbian film
- The Darkness (2016 American film), a supernatural horror film directed by Greg McLean
- The Darkness (2016 Mexican film), a horror thriller film directed by Daniel Castro Zimbrón
- Darkness (2019 film), an Italian drama film

=== Television ===
- "Darkness" (Der Pass), a 2019 episode
- "Darkness" (The Secret Circle), a 2012 episode
- "Darkness" (Stargate Universe), a 2009 episode
- The Darkness (TV series), a 2024 Icelandic mystery series directed by Lasse Hallström, based on the novel by Ragnar Jónasson

== Literature ==
- "Darkness" (poem), a poem by Lord Byron
- Darkness (short stories), a collection of stories by Bharati Mukherjee
- Darkness (novel), by John Saul, 1991
- The Darkness (novel), a 2000 novel by Anthony Eaton
- "The Darkness", a short story by David Drake
- The Darkness Series, a novel series by Harry Turtledove
- Darknesses, a novel in The Corean Chronicles by L. E. Modesitt, Jr.
- Darkness (KonoSuba), a character in the light novel series KonoSuba
- The Darkness (2018; translation of Dimma, 2015), a novel by Ragnar Jónasson in the Hidden Iceland series

== Music ==
- The Darkness (band), a British rock band
- The Darkness (Twiztid album), 2015
- The Darkness (Dawn of Solace album), 2006
- Darkness, a German Eurodance act featuring Nana
- "Darkness" (Aerosmith song)
- "Darkness" (Darren Hayes song)
- "Darkness" (Eminem song)
- "Darkness" (Peter Gabriel song)
- "Darkness", a song by Black Uhuru from Chill Out
- "Darkness", a song by Disturbed from Believe
- "Darkness", a song by Lamb from Between Darkness and Wonder
- "Darkness", a song by Leonard Cohen from Old Ideas
- "Darkness", a song by Rage Against the Machine from The Crow film soundtrack
- "Darkness", a song by SPF 1000 used in the animated TV series The Grim Adventures of Billy & Mandy
- "Darkness", a song by Third Eye Blind from Blue
- "Darkness", a song by The Police from Ghost in the Machine
- "Darkness", a song by The Human League from Dare
- "Darkness", a song by Jolin Tsai from Magic
- "Darkness", a song by Sweet Trip from You Will Never Know Why
- "The Darkness", a song by the Cat Empire from So Many Nights
- "The Darkness", a song by Primal Fear from New Religion

== Other uses ==
- The Darkness (character), an Image Comics character and series
- The Darkness (video game), a video game based on the comics
- The Darkness II, video game and sequel to The Darkness
- Darkness, a horse that ran in the 2009 Grand National
- La+ Darknesss, a Japanese VTuber

== See also ==
- Dark (disambiguation)
- Dark (TV series), a 2017 German-language TV series
- Darkness, Darkness (disambiguation)
- Prince of Darkness (disambiguation)
- World of Darkness (disambiguation)
