= Darke =

Darke may refer to:

- Dark (alternate spelling)
- Darke (surname)
- Darke County, Ohio
- Darke County Airport
- Darke Lake Provincial Park
- Darke Peak, South Australia
- USS Darke (APA-159), US Navy Haskell-class attack transport
- Darke (novel), the sixth book in the child fantasy Septimus Heap series by Angie Sage

== See also ==
- Dark (disambiguation)
