= Dark World =

The Dark World is a series of locations that serve as the primary setting of the episodic video game Deltarune.

Dark World may also refer to:

- Dark World (EP), a 2012 EP by Pity Sex
- Dark World (1935 film), a British film
- Dark World (2010 film), a Russian film
- Dark World (collective), a Massachusetts-based independent record label and music collective
- Dark World (2024 film), a 2024 Bangladeshi crime thriller film
- Thor: The Dark World, a 2013 American superhero film
- The Dark World, a 1946 fantasy novel attributed to Henry Kuttner
- Dark World (game), 1992 fantasy board game based on the Dark Eye system
- The Dark World (1953 film), a 1953 Turkish biographical drama film
- Dark World, a location in the video game, The Legend of Zelda: A Link to the Past
- Dark World: Into the Shadows with the Lead Investigator of the Ghost Adventures Crew, a 2011 book by Zak Bagans
- "Dark Worlds" an episode of the 2024 TV mini-series Solar System

== See also ==
- World of Darkness (disambiguation)
