= Digital dark age =

Degradation and loss of digitally-stored information

External videos
- Digital Dark Age (Computer History Museum, 2011)

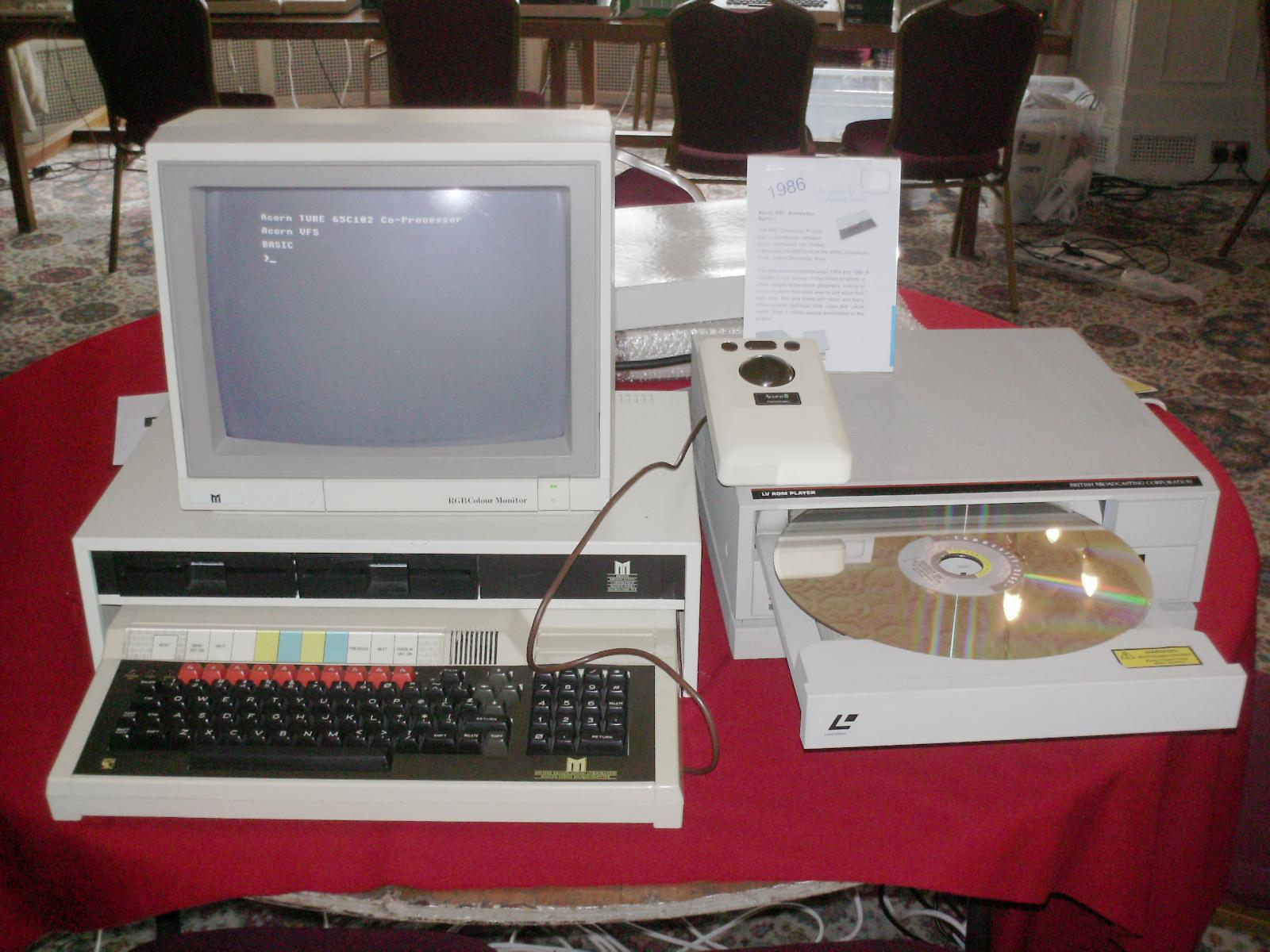
A computer terminal set up with a LaserDisc containing information from the 1986 BBC Domesday Project. The original Domesday Book is 940 years old and still legible, while the LaserDisc is already considered obsolete and difficult to read.

The digital dark age is a lack of historical information in the digital age as a direct result of outdated file formats, software, or hardware that becomes corrupt, scarce, or inaccessible as technologies evolve and data decays. Future generations may find it difficult or impossible to retrieve electronic documents and multimedia, because they have been recorded in an obsolete and obscure file format, or on an obsolete physical medium; for example, floppy disks. The name derives from the term Dark Ages in the sense that there could be a relative lack of records in the digital age as documents are transferred to digital formats and original copies are lost. An early mention of the term was at a conference of the International Federation of Library Associations and Institutions (IFLA) in 1997. The term was also mentioned in 1998 at the Time and Bits conference, which was co-sponsored by the Long Now Foundation and the Getty Conservation Institute.

== Proprietary and obsolete file formats ==
The problem is not limited to text documents, but applies equally to photos, video, audio and other kinds of electronic documents. One concern leading to the use of the term is that documents are stored on physical media which require special hardware in order to be read and that this hardware will not be available in a few decades from the time the document was created.

The digital dark age also applies to the problems which arise due to obsolete file formats. In such a case, it is the lack of necessary software which causes problems when retrieving stored documents. This is especially problematic when proprietary formats are used, in which case it might be impossible to write appropriate software to read the file.

== Archiving the internet ==
The Internet Archive stated in 2013 that a digital dark age is present, and one of their goals is to prevent digital materials from disappearing into the past.

Vinton Cerf, Vice President of Google, showed his concerns about data preservation in the annual meeting of the American Association for the Advancement of Science in 2015: "As the way that we store information about ourselves develops, memories stored in files that use older technology are becoming harder to access. That could mean that historians of the future are unable to learn about our lives". His suggested solution consists of preserving a sample of every piece of software and hardware that has ever existed so that it never becomes obsolete. He proposed taking an X-ray snapshot of the content, the application and the operating system along with a description of the machine. This information should be then stored, instead of in a museum, on a local machine or in servers in the cloud.

== Historical examples ==
A famous example is NASA, whose early space records have suffered from a dark age issue more than once. For over a decade, magnetic tapes from the 1976 Viking Mars landing were unprocessed. When later analyzed, the data was unreadable as it was in an unknown format and the original programmers had either died or left NASA. The images were eventually extracted following many months of puzzling through the data and examining how the recording machines functioned. The original Moon landing tapes were likely erased and reused, with the only video recordings of the Apollo 11 landings being later copies.

Another example is the BBC Domesday Project in which a survey of the United Kingdom was compiled 900 years after the Domesday Book was published. While the original Domesday Book of 1086 is still readable today, there were great fears that the discs of the 1986 Domesday Project would become unreadable as software and disk drives capable of reading the format became rarer and rarer. However, in 2002 the CAMiLEON project migrated the information to a system called DomesEm, allowing it to be accessed on modern computers. More recently, the Domesday86 Project has continued this preservation effort by developing a digitizer for the original LaserDiscs and emulation software for the original BBC Domesday computer system.

== Encryption and data preservation ==
Encryption may exacerbate the problem of preserving data, since decoding adds complexity even when the relevant software is available. Historically, encrypted data is quite rare, but even the very simple means available throughout history have provided many examples of documents that can only be read with great effort. For example, it took the capacity of a distributed computing project to break the mechanically generated code of a single brief World War II submarine tactical message.

== Open-source file formats ==
As more records are stored in digital form, there have been several measures to standardize electronic file formats so software to read them is widely available and can be re-implemented on new platforms if necessary.

PDF/A is an open standard based on Adobe Systems PDF format. It has been widely adopted by governments and archives around the world, such as the United Kingdom.

The Open Document Format for Office Applications (OpenDocument) has been standardized by OASIS in 2005, and by ISO in 2006. Since then, support for OpenDocument has been implemented in a large number of open-source and proprietary software. Therefore, using OpenDocument is one option for archiving editable documents from office applications. More broadly, the use of open-source software is a prevention measure. Since the source code for reading and writing a file format is open, the code can be used as a base for future implementations. In 2007, the chief information officer of the UK's National Archives stated "We welcome open-source software because it makes our lives easier".

== Data storage standardization ==
In July 2007, Microsoft created a partnership with the UK's National Archives to prevent the digital dark age and "unlock millions of unreadable stored computer files". UK's National Archives now accepts various file formats for long-term preservation, including Office Open XML, PDF and OpenDocument.

== Criticism ==
The notion of the digital dark age has been criticized by some scholars. Some of these, such as David Anderson and Jon Tilbury, view it as alarmist rhetoric, maintaining that the notion of a "dark age" incorrectly states the current condition. They argue that there has been significant progress in digital preservation and evidenced in the way organizations continue to find and reuse critical long-term digital information while finding new ways of sharing these with the public. Some historians also fault proponents of the digital dark age for historical inaccuracies. These include Marilyn Deegan and Simon Tanner's claim that the Gutenberg printing revolution led Europe out of the Dark Ages, a period said to be marked by the loss of knowledge of the learning of the ancient Greeks and Romans. It is argued that knowledge and information about classical learning had been recovered during the Middle Ages and it was not mainly due to the printing revolution but, instead, was largely a result of the intellectual exchange between Islamic and Christian cultures.

== See also ==
- Abandonware
- Apollo 11 missing tapes
- Dark data
- Data archaeology
- Data corruption
- Data rot
- Digital continuity
- Digital obsolescence
- Digital preservation
- Disc rot
- Document Freedom Day
- M-DISC
- Lost media
- Open-source-software movement
- Orphaned works
- Software rot
