= Nokia 100 =

Mobile Phone

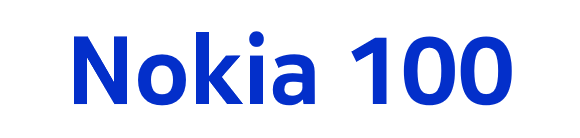

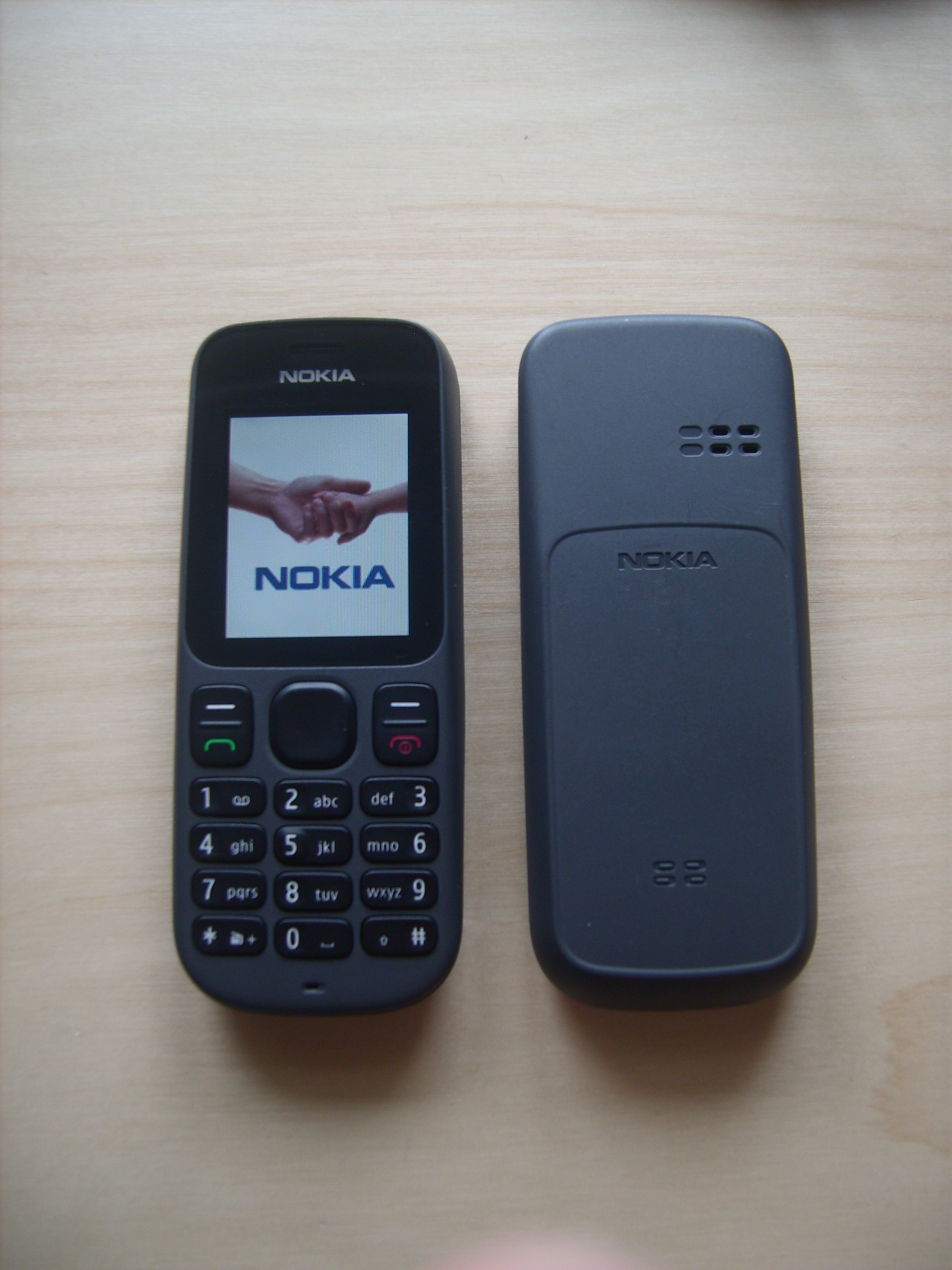
- Manufacturer: Nokia
- Type: Feature phone
- Series: Nokia 3-digit series
- First released: 25 August 2011; 15 years ago
- Availability by region: October 2011
- Discontinued: Q3 2015
- Predecessor: Nokia 1616
- Successor: Nokia 105
- Related: Nokia 101
- Compatible networks: GSM 900/1800 or 850/1900
- Colors: Blue, Pink, Black, Red
- Dimensions: 110 x 45.5 x 14.9 mm
- Weight: 70g
- Operating system: Series 30
- Battery: BL-5CB 3.7V 800mAh (removable): Standby: up to 609.3 h; (25 days): Talk time: up to 6.7 h
- Display: 65,536-colour LCD: 1.8 in (46 mm) diagonal, 120 × 160 px (3:4 aspect ratio)
- Connectivity: FM radio

The Nokia 100 is a discontinued basic 2G feature phone released by Nokia on 25 August 2011. The mobile phone was aimed at emerging markets and budget-conscious consumers, and could be bought carrier-unlocked for a relatively low price (€20 or U.S. $30 at launch).

It should not be confused with the original Nokia 100 from 1993, which was a consumer version of the 1992 Nokia 101.

There was also a dual-SIM card slot version of the model, Nokia 101, released in October 2011.

The phone had a color display, an integrated flashlight, an FM radio, and automatic voice alarm. It was released in blue, pink, black, and red colours.

The device runs on the Series 30 software platform, supports up to five separate address books, and is able to store personalisation data for up to five separate SIM cards. The phone also comes with the Solitaire game. The early production sets came with a Snake game only, according to the reviews in GSM Arena.

In emerging markets, the phone came with Nokia Life Tools, and with Nokia Money in India.

Nokia 100 is available in a number of languages depending on which territory it is marketed for. Models sold in South Asia support at least twelve languages: English, Hindi, Gujarati, Marathi, Tamil, Bengali, Telugu, Punjabi, Kannada, Malayalam, Assamese and Odia. Models sold in the United Kingdom support four languages: English, French, German and Italian.
