= Nokia 101 (2011) =

2011 cell phone model

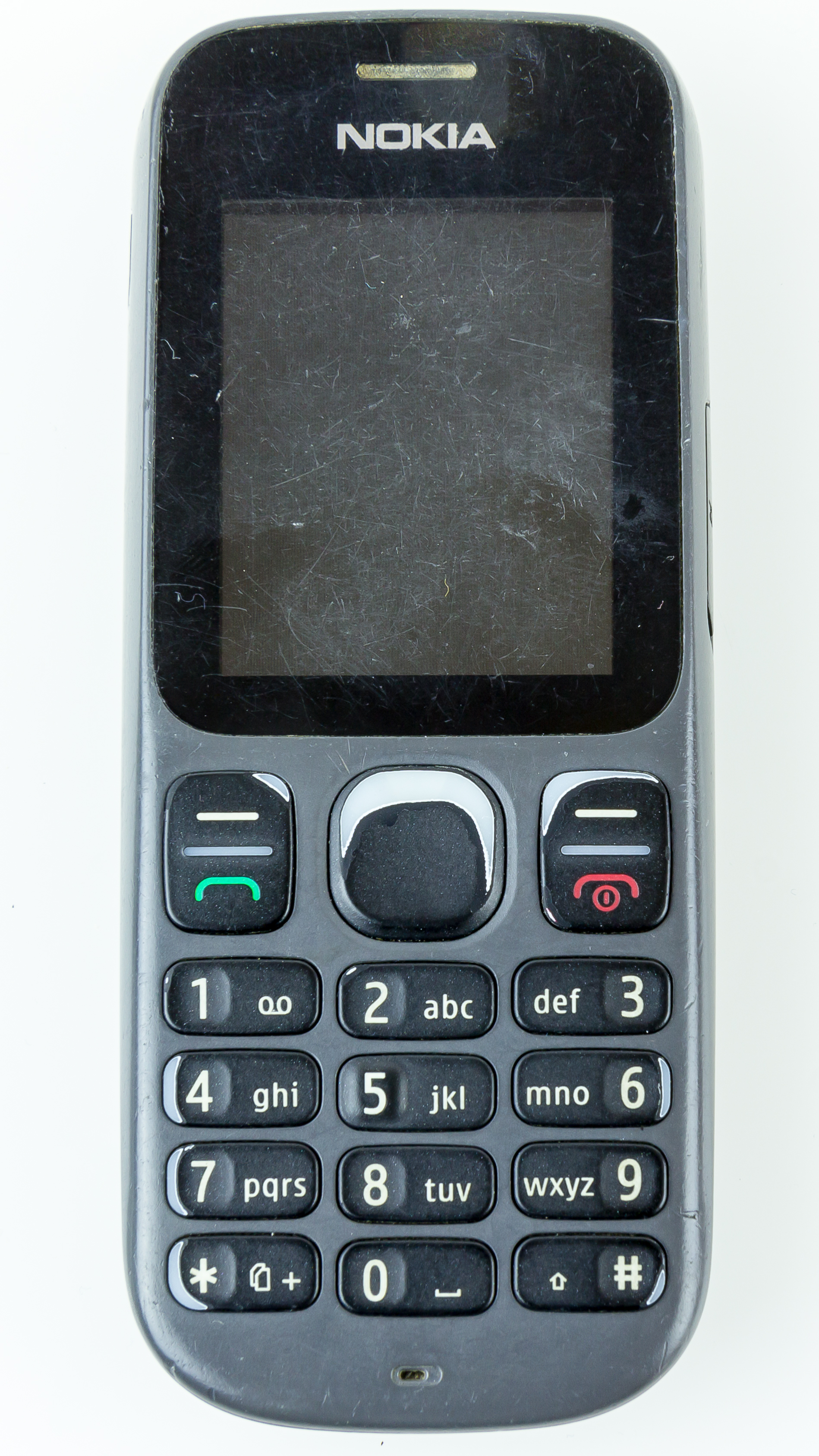
- Manufacturer: Nokia
- Type: Basic phone
- Series: Nokia 3-digit series
- First released: August 2011; 15 years ago
- Predecessor: Nokia 1800
- Successor: Nokia 105
- Related: Nokia X1-01; Nokia 100
- Form factor: Bar
- Colors: Black, Red
- Dimensions: 110 mm × 45.5 mm × 14.9 mm (4.33 in × 1.79 in × 0.59 in)
- Weight: 71 g (2.5 oz)
- Operating system: Series 30
- Memory: 8 MB RAM
- Removable storage: microSD, up to 16 GB
- Battery: BL-5C, 3.7 V 1020 mAh Li-Ion
- Display: TFT, 65K colors 128 x 160 pixels, 1.8 inches (~114 ppi pixel density)
- Connectivity: 3.5 mm headphone jack; FM radio, Stereo
- Data inputs: Keypad
- Other: MP3 player, Flashlight

The Nokia 101 is an ultra-basic dual-SIM mobile phone by Nokia. It is primarily geared for users in developing countries, or for people who need a simple communications device with FM radio and music playback.

This phone model is not to be confused with the 1992 Nokia 101.

== Features ==
The phone runs on a Li-ion battery that can last up to 768 hours on standby, and with talk time of up to 8 hours and 30 minutes.

The phone can play standard MP3 files with a bitrate greater than 32 bit/s, with advertised 36 hours of playback time.

The phonebook can hold up to 500 entries.

== Variance ==
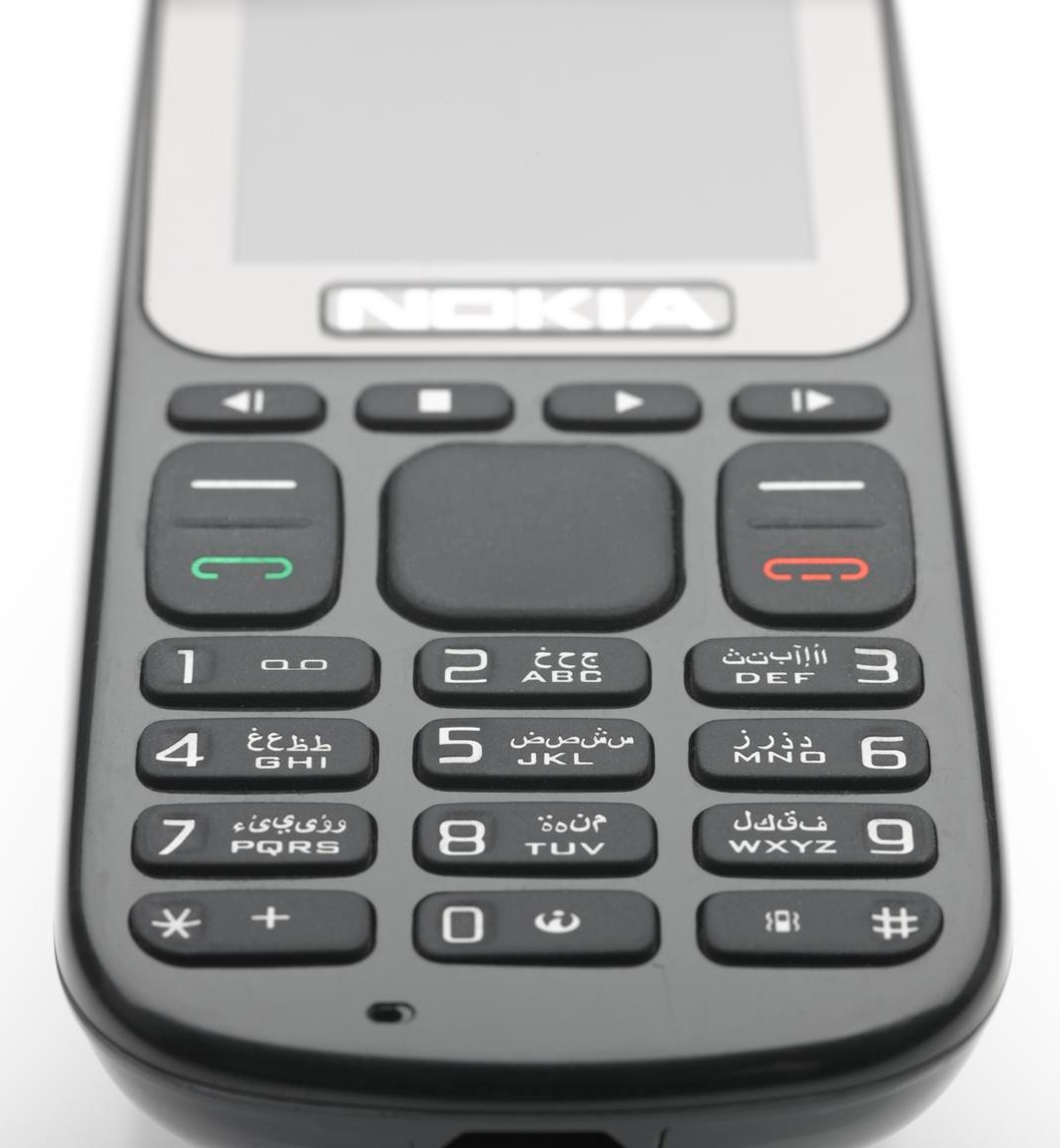
Nokia 101 clone manufactured by M-Horse, possibly in Dubai, UAE, 2008–2012. Purchased in Cameroon in 2012.

This phone is available in only two colors: Phantom Black and Coral Red.
