= The Dark =

The Dark may refer to:

- Darkness, the absence of light

== Radio, film and television ==
- The Dark (1979 film), science fiction horror film directed by John Cardos
- The Dark (2005 film), British-German horror film starring Sean Bean
- The Dark (2018 film), Austrian horror film
- The Dark, 1993 film featuring Jaimz Woolvett
- The Dark (TV series), 2026 British crime drama television series
- "The Dark", 1937 episode of the radio drama Lights Out

== Literature ==
- The Dark (Curley novel), a 2003 novel by Marianne Curley
- The Dark (Herbert novel), a 1980 novel by James Herbert
- The Dark (McGahern novel), a 1965 novel by John McGahern
- The Dark (magazine), a magazine published by Sean Wallace
- The Dark, a series of comics published in the 1990s by Continüm Comics
- The Dark, a play by Charlotte Jones

== Music ==
- The Dark (Chelsea Wolfe album)
- The Dark (Guy Clark album)
- The Dark (Metal Church album)
- "The Dark", a song by Brymo from the album 9: Harmattan & Winter
- "The Dark", a song by Caro Emerald from the EP Emerald Island
- "The Dark", a song by Chelsea Wolfe from the album The Dark
- "The Dark", a song by Gothminister from the album We Are All Demons
- "The Dark", a song by Simon Curtis featuring Jay-Z from the album 8Bit Heart
- "The Dark", a song by Trans-Siberian Orchestra from the album Beethoven's Last Night
- "The Dark", a punk band from London who recorded with Fresh Records

== Other uses ==
- The Dark, 1994 playing card set, see Magic: The Gathering expansion sets, 1993–1995
- The Dark, role-playing game character in Villains and Vigilantes; basis for the comics series (see above)
- "The Dark", nickname for Brendan Hughes (1948–2008), Irish republican

== See also ==
- Dark (disambiguation)
