= Nokia 105 (2015) =

Nokia-branded mobile phone

Nokia 105 (2015) / Nokia 105 Dual SIM (2015)
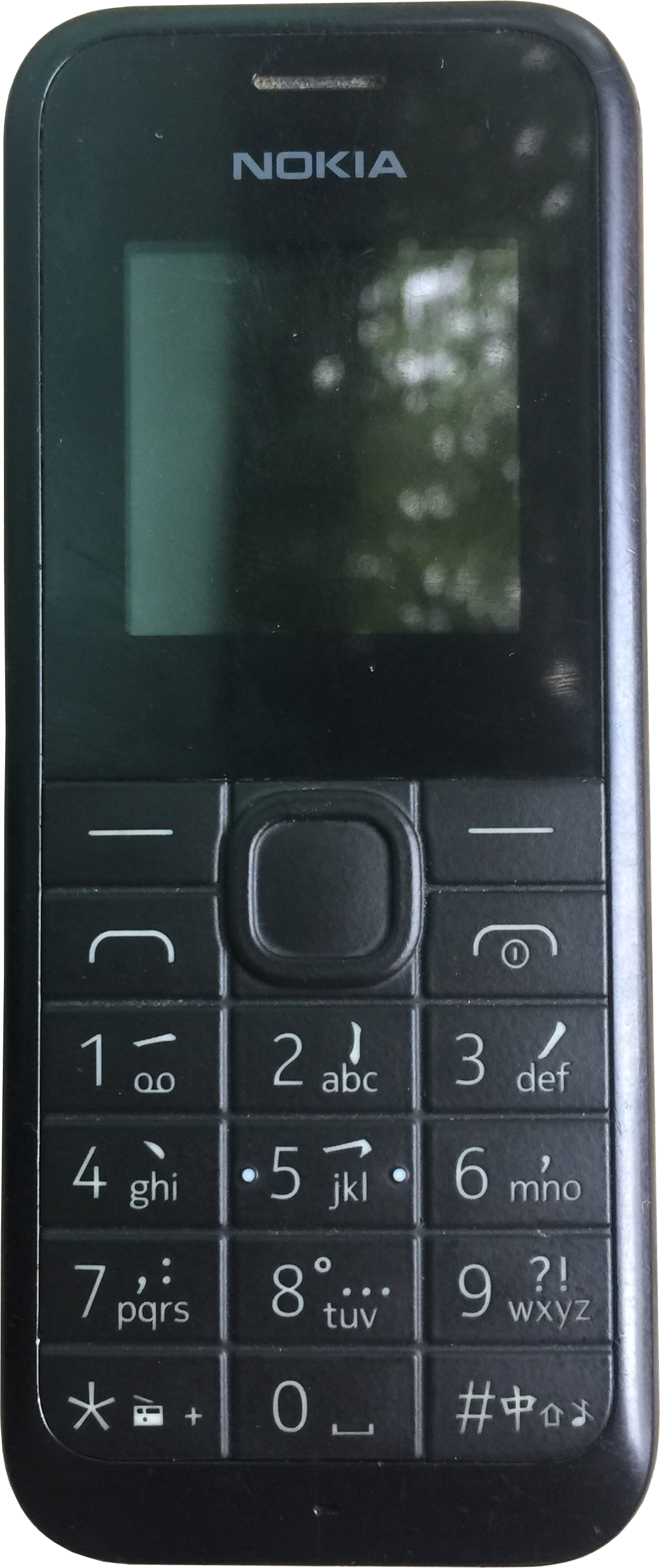
- Nokia 105 (2015) in black
- Brand: Nokia
- Developer: HMD Global (formerly Microsoft Mobile)
- Manufacturer: Foxconn (formerly Microsoft Mobile)
- Type: Feature phone
- Series: Nokia 3-digit series
- First released: 3 June 2015; 11 years ago
- Discontinued: 2018
- Predecessor: Nokia 105
- Successor: Nokia 105 (2017)
- Compatible networks: GSM (900/1800 MHz)
- Form factor: Bar
- Colors: Black, White, Cyan
- Dimensions: H: 108.5 mm (4.27 in); W: 45.5 mm (1.79 in); D: 14.1 mm (0.56 in)
- Weight: 69.6 g (2.46 oz)
- Operating system: Nokia Series 30+
- System-on-chip: MediaTek MT6261D
- Memory: 4 MB RAM
- Battery: 800 mAh Li-ion, removable (Nokia BL-5CB)
- Display: 1.4 in (36 mm) 128 x 128 (~129 ppi pixel density) TFT with 65K colors
- Connectivity: 3.5 mm headphone jack; FM radio; micro USB 2.0
- Data inputs: Keypad
- Other: Flashlight

The Nokia 105 (2015) and Nokia 105 Dual SIM (2015) are Nokia-branded feature phones originally developed by Microsoft Mobile. The phones were originally released on 3 June 2015, as a revival of the original Nokia 105 (released in 2013), and sold again by HMD Global. The Nokia 105 (2015) has one SIM card slot, and the Nokia 105 Dual SIM (2015) with two slots. The selectable colours are black, white and cyan.
