= Nokia 105 (2013) =

Mobile phone model

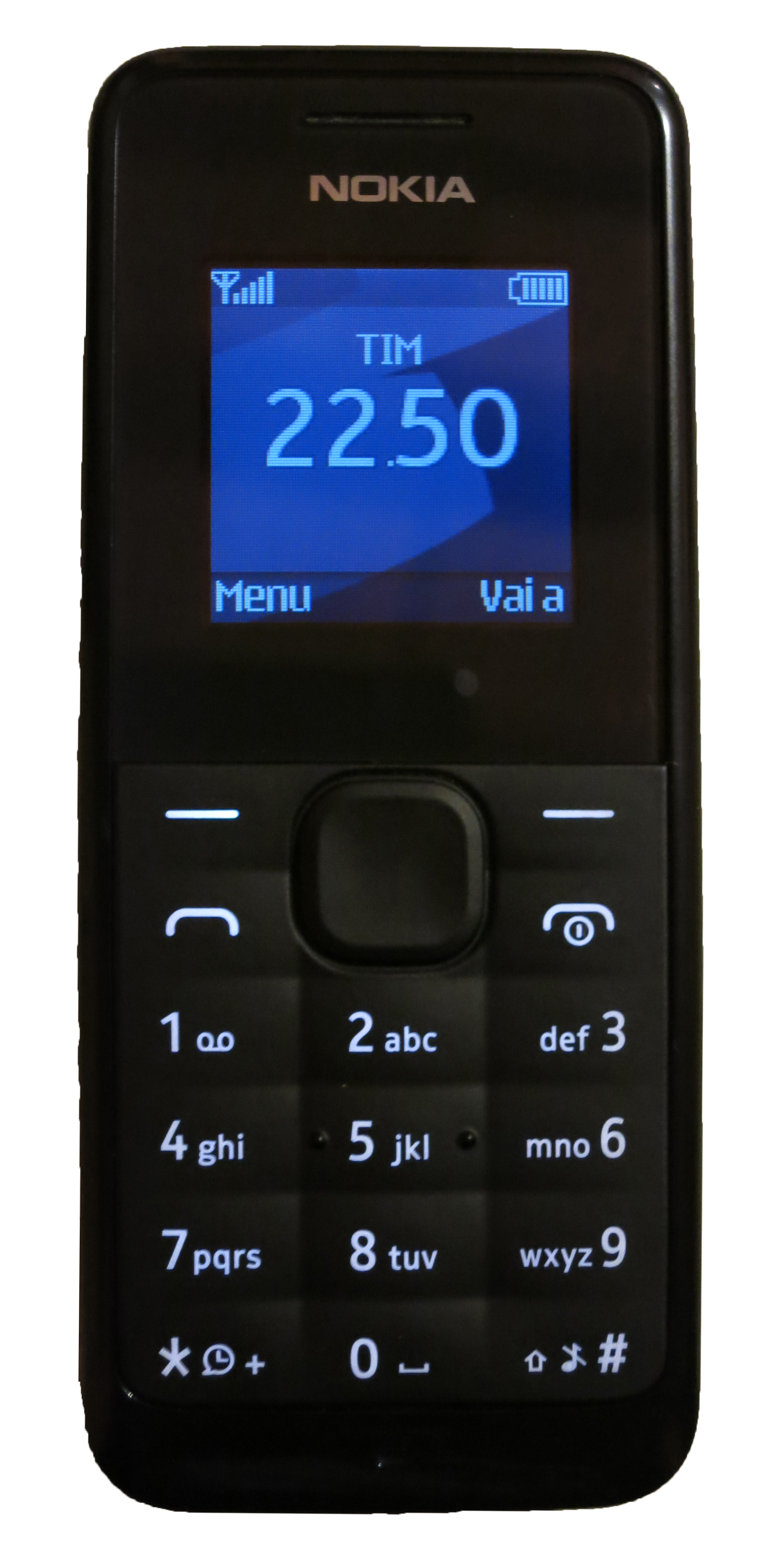
- Brand: Nokia
- Manufacturer: Nokia
- Type: Feature phone
- Series: Nokia 3-digit series
- First released: March 2013
- Discontinued: 2016
- Predecessor: Nokia 100; Nokia 101
- Successor: Nokia 105 (2015)
- Compatible networks: GSM 900 / 1800
- Form factor: Monoblock
- Colors: Black, Cyan
- Dimensions: 107 mm (4.2 in); 44.8 mm (1.76 in); 14.3 mm (0.56 in)
- Weight: 70 g (2.5 oz)
- Operating system: Nokia Series 30
- Battery: 800 mAh Li-Ion (Nokia BL-5CB)
- Display: 1.45 in (3.7 cm) TFT, 128×128 pixels (125 ppi)
- Sound: Loudspeaker
- Connectivity: 3.5 mm headphone jack; FM radio; Proprietary charger
- Data inputs: Keypad
- Other: LED Flashlight (on top)

The Nokia 105 is a feature phone manufactured by Nokia. It was first unveiled at the Mobile World Congress (MWC) in February 2013 and was released in the second quarter of 2013, aimed at markets in developing countries.

== Specifications ==
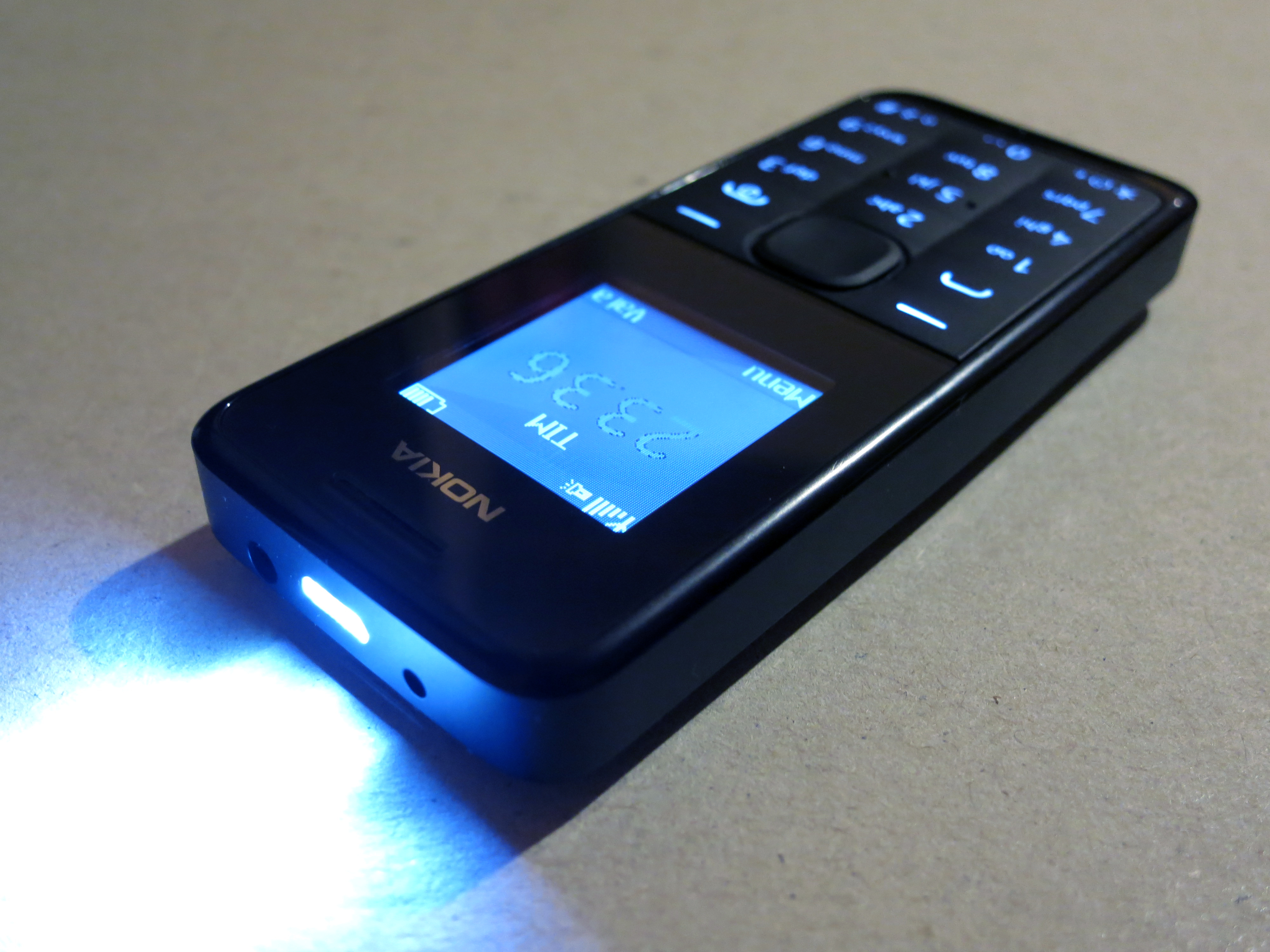
Nokia 105 with the torchlight on

The Nokia 105 is said to offer up to 35 days of standby time on a single charge and up to 12.5 hours of talk time. Furthermore, it includes a flashlight and an FM radio.

== Other uses ==
A report by Conflict Armament Research specified the 105 Type RM-908 Nokia phone, purchased between May and November 2014, was being "consistently used" by ISIS in Iraq to produce a type of remote controlled improvised explosive device.

== See also ==
- Nokia 3-digit series
- Nokia 130
- Nokia 215
- Nokia 105 (2015)
