= Nokia 1610 =

Mobile phone

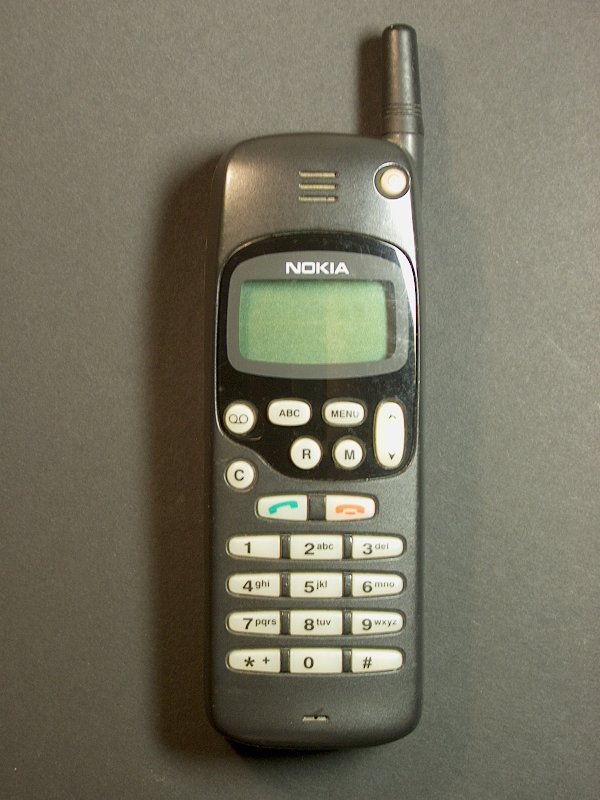
- Manufacturer: Nokia
- Availability by region: 1996
- Predecessor: Nokia 2010
- Successor: Nokia 3110
- Related: Nokia 1011
- Dimensions: 10.5 cm
- Weight: 250 g (9 oz)

Nokia 1610 is a mid-range mobile phone model manufactured by Nokia. It complemented the Nokia 2110 business model, but had significantly fewer features. It was introduced in April 1996 and released in May and became popular at the time.

== Description ==
The Nokia 1610 had a monochromatic display which could show two rows of text at a time. The operating manual did not mention a possibility to send text messages, but at least units sold from 1996 and onwards included the function. The SMS capable version was called 1610 Plus. The phone used an external rigid antenna, but had a groove on the inside of the battery to accommodate a pull-out type antenna. The 1610 used a credit card size SIM-card, and was powered by a NiMH type battery with a capacity of 600 mAh. The phone was stated to have up to 7 hours of call time and up to 200 hours of standby time. There was a dedicated voicemail button.

Chargers compatible: ACH-6, ACH-8

== Reception ==
Contemporary French magazine Mobiles gave an overall positive review of the phone, noting the long battery life, accessible software and font size, and affordable price. It was noted that the large size of the phone made it seem outdated. The book Mobile Usability praised the user interface, stating it "supported the necessary features of its time quite well."
