= Nokia 1616 =

Mobile phone model

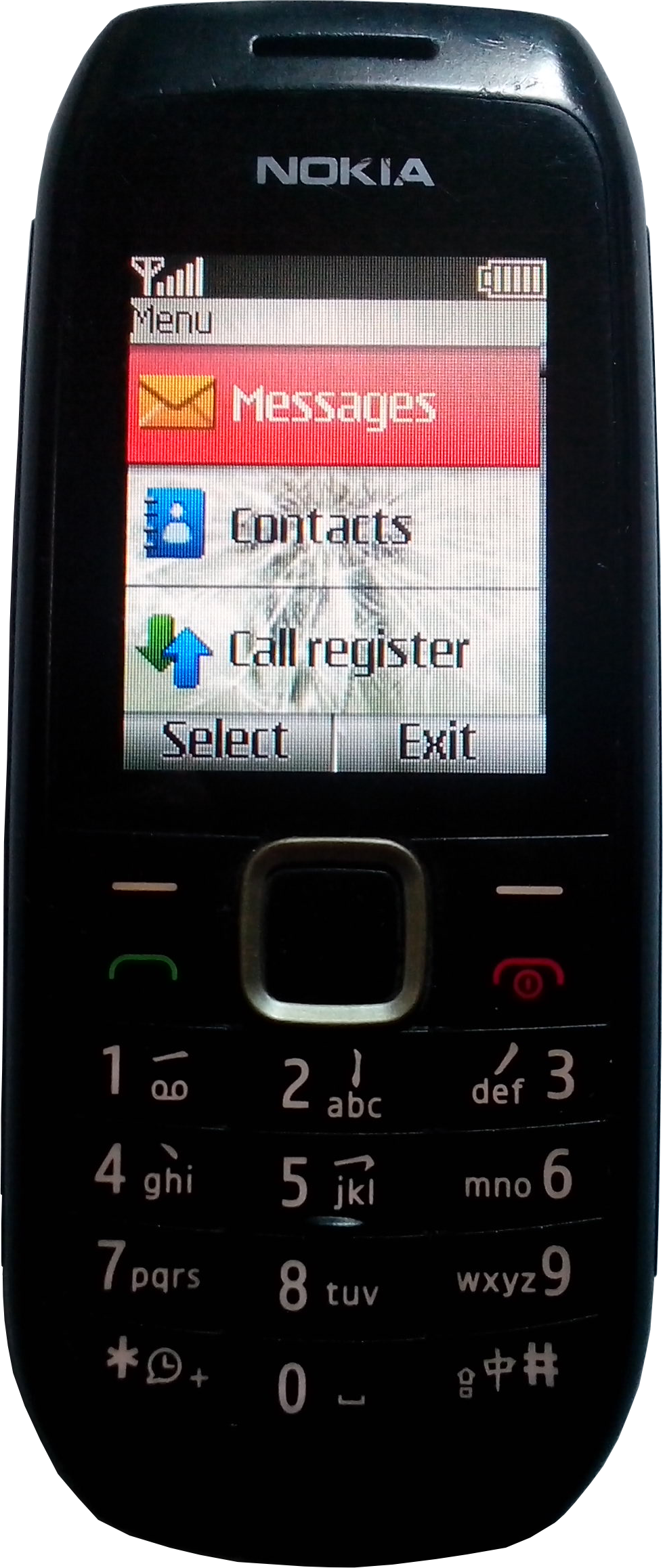
- Manufacturer: Nokia
- Series: Ultrabasic
- First released: 4 November 2009; 16 years ago
- Availability by region: 1 March 2010 EMEA, India, Philippines, United States
- Discontinued: 2012
- Predecessor: Nokia 1661
- Successor: Nokia 100
- Related: Nokia 1800; Nokia C1-00
- Compatible networks: GSM 850/1900; EGSM 900/1800
- Form factor: candybar
- Dimensions: 107×45×15 mm (4.21×1.77×0.59 in)
- Weight: 78.55 g (3 oz) (with battery)
- Operating system: Series 30
- Battery: Removable, BL-5CB; 800mAh 3.7V 3.0Wh: Standby: 22.5 days (540 h); Talk time: 8.52 hours
- Charging: 2.0 mm connector for Nokia AC-3 or compatible charger
- Display: 1.8" TFT, 128x160 px, 65K colors
- Sound: Speakerphone; FM radio (requires headset); 3.5 mm 4-pin TRRS socket for headset (Nokia WH-102); Supports 3-pin TRS for standard headphones (then audio-out only)
- Data inputs: Alphanumeric keypad
- Model: 1616-2: RH-125; 1616-2b: RH-126; 1616-2c: RH-129
- Other: Mini-SIM; Flashlight

Nokia 1616 is an affordable ultrabasic GSM mobile phone from Nokia announced on 4 November 2009 and released on 1 March 2010 for developing countries and budget users for a suggested price of €24 before taxes and excluding subsidies (SIM-free).

The device's main non-phone features are flashlight at the top of the device, and an FM radio. The radio requires a headset or headphones in lieu of an antenna to function, and can work in the background, thereby providing access to other phone tasks without having to turn it off.

A dual-SIM variant of the Nokia 1616 was released, known as the Nokia C1-00.

== Hardware ==
The device has a color display with scratch-proof display glass, a dust-proof keypad, and comes in Black, Dark Gray, Dark Blue, and Dark Red colors.

In addition to the phone, the battery, and the Nokia AC-3 compact charger, the original packaging also includes a Nokia WH-102 stereo headset.

== Functionality ==
The Series 30-based handset has support for multiple phonebooks, and its memory can hold up to 500 contacts in addition to the amount offered in a SIM card. Each contact can be assigned three telephone numbers. SMS storage is up to 250 messages.

Other functions include a speaking clock (accessible through the * button with a clock symbol) combined with an alarm clock, calendar, reminder, basic calculator, converter, timer and stopper, and a spreadsheet-like expenses ledger for budgeting.

== Services ==
Models for emerging markets included the SMS-based Nokia Life Tools subscription information service, which utilized services, such as:

- Nokia Life Tools Agriculture (weather reports, crop cycles and market prices),
- Nokia Life Tools Education, and
- Nokia Life Tools Entertainment (entertainment news and daily horoscopes).

Nokia 1616 with Nokia Life Tools was presented on 8 January 2010 by then-CEO of Nokia Olli-Pekka Kallasvuo at his CES 2010 keynote in Las Vegas, Nevada.

== Reception ==
Damien McFerran at CNET UK praised the phone for its dustproof keypad, FM radio, and flashlight. Special mention was given to good battery life, a standard 3.5mm headphone jack (earlier Nokia phones used a 2.5mm connector), and inclusion of headphones in the packaging, which McFerran pointed out is something that other manufacturers' budget phones packaging did not include.

In a May 2010 guest opinion published in the German t3n magazine, Swiss IT author Roman Hanhart weighed the pros and cons of having a smartphone and a basic phone. Hanhart compared the dismal battery life of his SIM-locked 800-franc HTC Dream (on Android 1.5) and the need to be on-demand online — versus the two weeks' battery life using his Nokia 1616 that he ordered for a total of 44 francs from a webshop (delivery price included; approx. retail price 38 SFr.), and his sense of liberty with a basic phone, wherein he could attain the level of reachability he wanted without having to worry about his phone collecting information on him.

In a July 2010 comparative review of budget phones published in the Russian weekly Argumenty i Fakty and penned by Viktor Zaykovskiy, Nokia 1616 got the top spot, as offering the best price-to-feature ratio. Zaykovskiy pointed out the presence of a colour display in a budget phone, quick UI responsiveness, the rubber keypad (protects from dust and occasional water drops), good battery life, and the flashlight. He praised the FM radio's excellent reception, sound quality and volume, and that the radio can work as a background task, thus enabling people to use other phone functions while listening to music. Zaykovskiy concluded that this was "one of the best phones one can buy for 1350 roubles."

== Market share and popularity ==
In 2010 in Estonia, Nokia 1616 was the 10th most popular phone for Tele2, and made the list of top four most-sold Nokia phones at Elisa (1616 was the fourth mentioned), with Nokia phones making the most overall sales for Elisa. It was sold in Elisa with a prepaid SIM card for €19.17.

As of early June 2011, Nokia 1616 was the 4th most popular SIM-free phone in Austria, according to data by electronics retailer Saturn.

In Russia, Nokia 1616 was rated the 4th most popular non-smartphone by sales for the month of February 2011 (priced at 1000 roubles) according to data by Russian electronics retailer Eldorado and CNews.ru, and was the 4th most popular phone in the Tele2 Rossiya network as of late July 2013.

In 2014, Nokia 1616 made the #2 position in the list of most popular entry-level non-data mobile phones in South Africa in terms of usage share, based on statistics from Vodacom, a major operator in the region.
