= Nokia 1661 =

Cellular phone

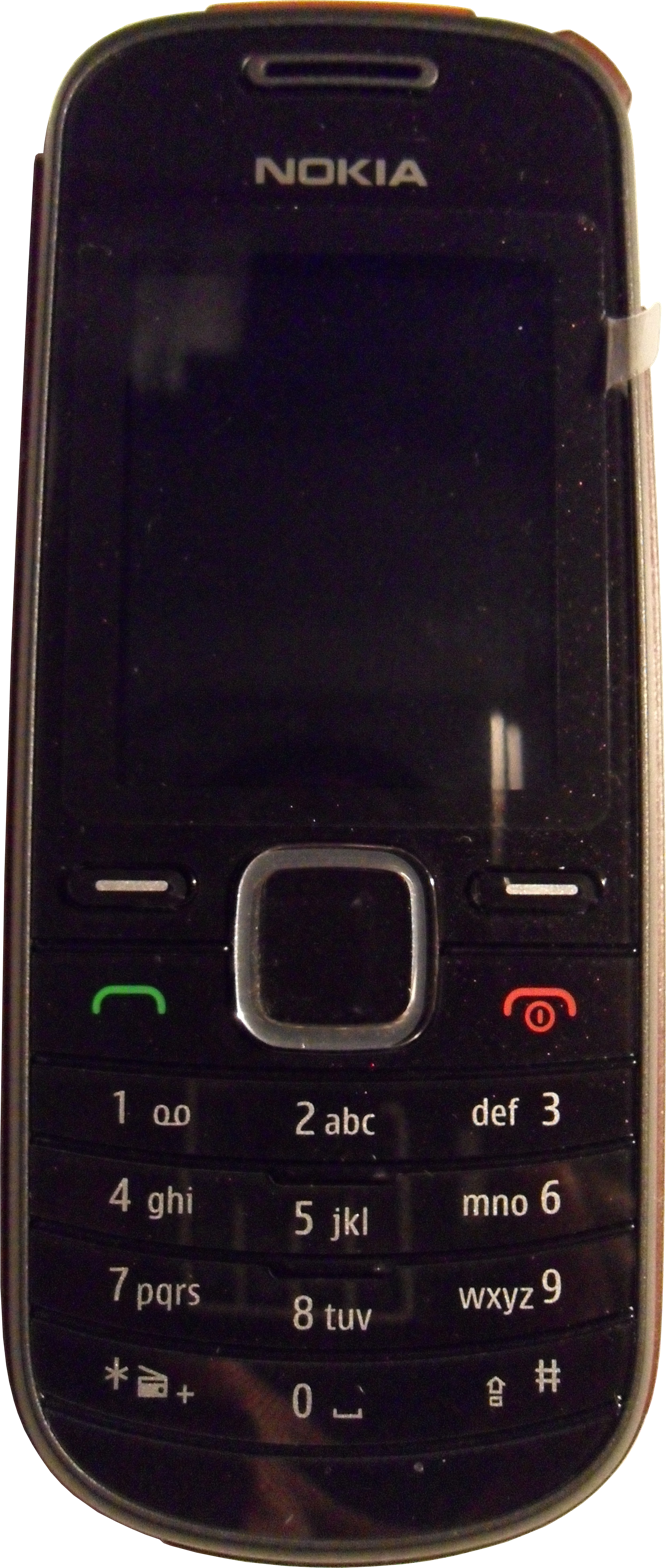
- Manufacturer: Nokia
- Type: Featurephone
- Series: Ultrabasic
- First released: November 2008; 17 years ago
- Availability by region: Q2 2009(Global)
- Discontinued: Yes
- Predecessor: Nokia 1208
- Successor: Nokia 1616; Nokia 1800
- Form factor: candybar
- Weight: 82 g (3 oz)
- Memory: 500 phonebook entries; up to 250 SMS messages
- Storage: 8 MB
- Battery: Removable, 860 mAh, type BL-4C: Standby: 19 days and 19 hours (475 h); Talk time: 4 hours, 10 minutes
- Display: 1.8" TFT LCD, 128×160 px
- Sound: 2.5 mm audio jack, FM radio
- Data inputs: Alphanumeric keypad
- SAR: Head: 1.31 W/kg; Body: 0.60 W/kg
- Other: Mini-SIM; Flashlight; Predictive text input

Nokia 1661 is a mobile phone from Nokia part of the Ultrabasic family. which was released in Q2 2009.

== See also ==
- List of Nokia products
