= Dark Eye =

Dark Eye(s) or The Dark Eye may refer to:

== Film, television, theater, and audio drama ==
- Dark Eyes (1935 film), a 1935 French drama film
- Dark Eyes (play), a 1943 play by Elena Miramova in collaboration with Eugenie Leontovich
- Dark Eyes (1951 film) (Schwarze Augen), a German film starring Cornell Borchers
- Dark Eyes (1987 film), an Italian and Russian-language film
- Dark Eyes (TV series), a 1995 series pilot featuring Roy Dupuis
- Dark Eyes (audio drama), a 2012 Doctor Who audio drama starring Paul McGann

== Games ==
- The Dark Eye (role-playing game), a 1984 German role-playing system
- The Dark Eye (video game), a 1995 horror computer game
- Dark Eyes (video game), a 1999 Japanese multiplayer online role-playing game for Windows developed by Sega and Nextech
- The Dark Eye: Demonicon, a 2013 spinoff of the 1984 German fantasy-themed role-playing video game

== Literature ==
- Dark Eye: The Films of David Fincher (born 1962), 2003 book about David Fincher
- Dark Eye, a 2005 novel by William Bernhardt

== Music ==
- "Dark Eyes" (Russian song), an 1843 song often performed in concerts of gypsy music
- "Dark Eyes" (Bob Dylan song), from Empire Burlesque
- Dark Eyes (Tomasz Stańko album), 2009
- Dark Eyes (Half Moon Run album), 2012
- Dark Adapted Eye, a 1988 compilation album by Danielle Dax

== See also ==
- Eye color
- Dark (disambiguation)
- Black Eyes (disambiguation)
