= Nokia 1800 =

Cell phone model

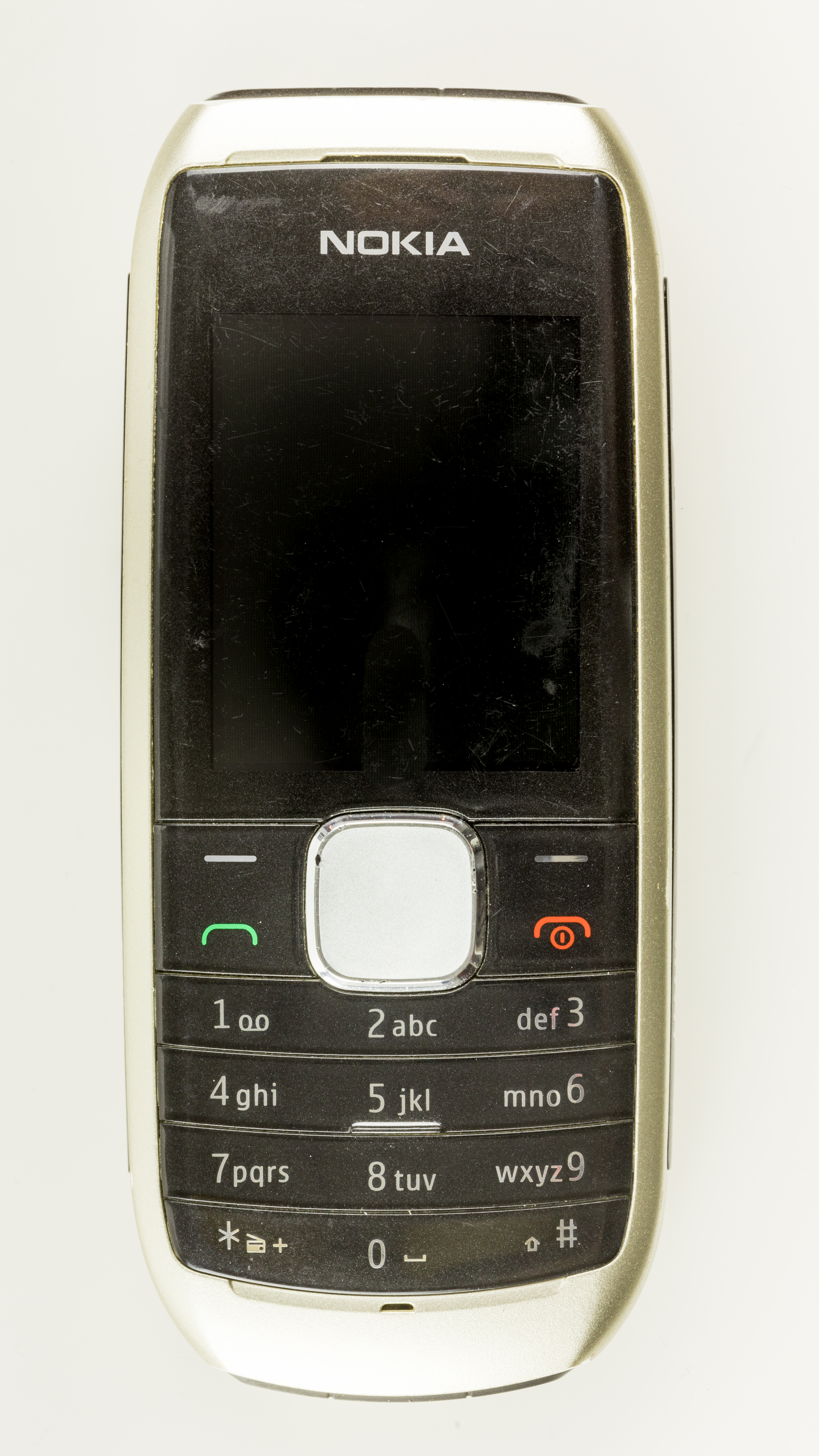
- Manufacturer: Nokia
- Series: Nokia 1000 series
- First released: May 2010; 16 years ago
- Availability by region: June 2010(Global)
- Predecessor: Nokia 1661
- Successor: Nokia 101
- Related: Nokia 1616
- Form factor: candybar
- Dimensions: H: 107 mm (4.2 in); W: 45 mm (1.8 in) W D: 15.3 mm (0.60 in)
- Weight: 78.5 g (2.77 oz)
- Storage: 8 MB
- Battery: 800 mAh (BL-5CB)
- Display: 1.8 inch TFT
- Data inputs: Keypad

Nokia 1800 is an affordable ultrabasic mobile phone by Nokia, which was announced in November 2009 and released in June 2010.

== See also ==
- List of Nokia products
