= Nokia 2010 =

1994 cell phone model

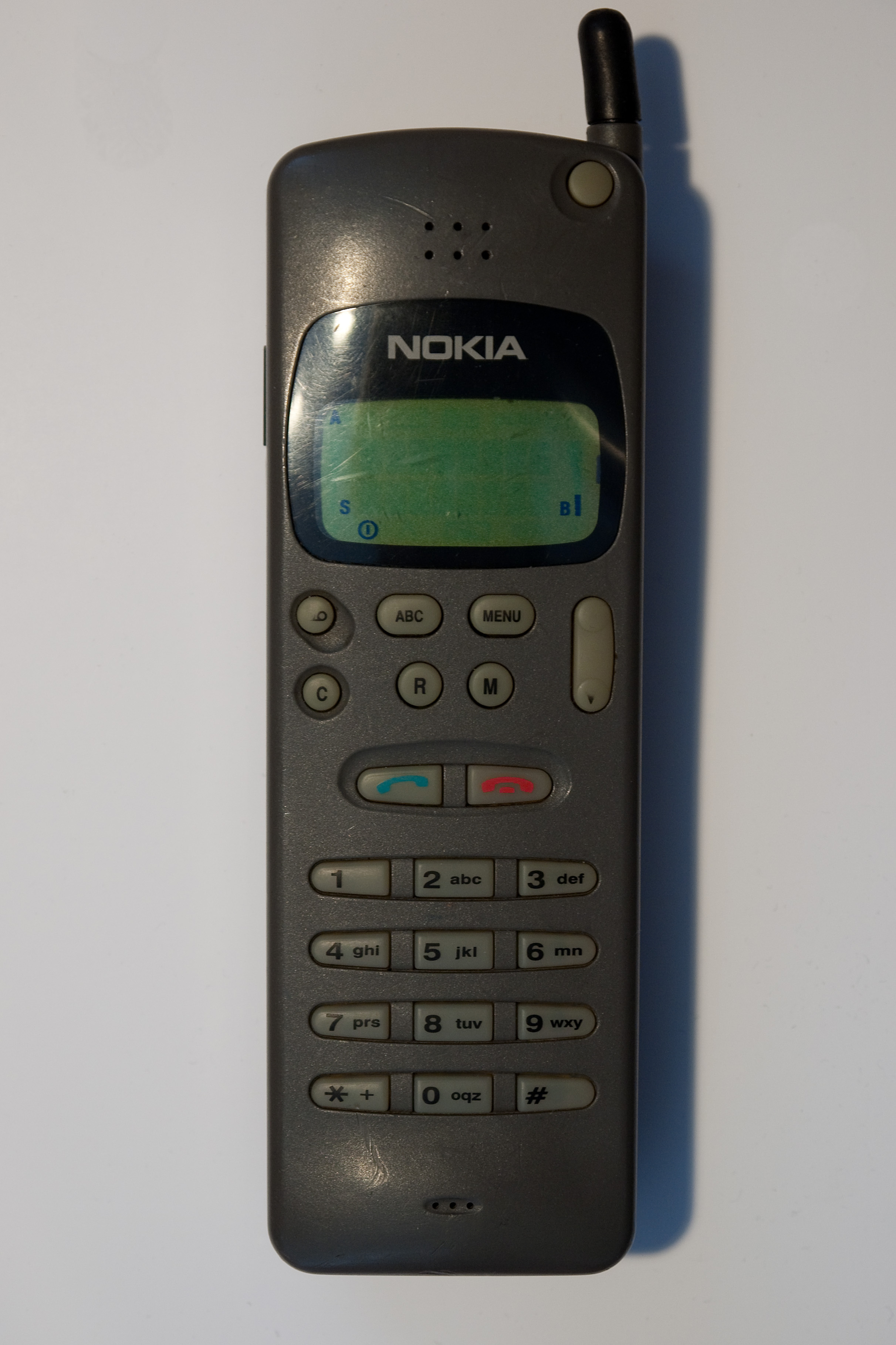
- Manufacturer: Nokia
- Availability by region: 1994
- Predecessor: Nokia 1011
- Successor: Nokia 1610
- Compatible networks: GSM900
- Form factor: Bar/Brick
- Dimensions: 165×58×28 mm (6.5×2.3×1.1 in)
- Weight: 275 g (10 oz)
- Display: monochrome
- Data inputs: keypad
- Model: NHE-3DN
- Development status: Discontinued, rare

The Nokia 2010 is a mobile phone that was announced by Finnish phone manufacturer Nokia in January 1994.

According to the late Matti Makkonen, a manager of Nokia Mobile Phones at the time, Nokia 2010 was the first mobile phone to enable writing messages easily.

Other features include lists of 10 dialed calls, 10 received calls and 10 missed calls.

The phone has a monochromatic display that can show two rows of text at a time, which are surrounded by symbols for dedicated functions — battery status and reception level on either side; SMS message notification, keypad lock, et al. at the top. The handset has an antenna slot that supports either an external rigid antenna, or a pull-out type antenna (more common). The 2010 used a full-size (1FF) sim-card.

Nokia 2010 was the more affordable version in the 2xxx series than the business-oriented Nokia 2110, both of which were released in 1994.

In terms of design, the 2010 stayed truer to its predecessor model of Nokia 1011 than the 2110.

Battery life was quoted as being from 20 to 40 hours with its full-length Ni-Cad battery but, real-world use in a metro area with reasonable signal strength returned about 25hrs or, just 1 hour of talk time.
