= Black eye (disambiguation) =

A black eye is an injury.

An iris of the eyes that is very dark brown may appear almost black. Special color contact lenses can be used to make the eyes appear black.

Aniridia is a congenital condition in which the iris is poorly developed or nonexistent, giving the eye a black color because only the pupil can be seen.

Black eye may also refer to:

- Blackeye, or Black-eyed pea, a subspecies of Cowpea, a type of bean
- "Blackeye", a song by Toto from Tambu
- Black Eye (album)
- Black eye (drink), a cup of coffee with two shots of espresso in it
- Black Eye (film), a 1974 film starring Fred Williamson and directed by Jack Arnold
- Black Eye Galaxy, (a.k.a. M64 or NGC 4826), a pinwheel-shaped spiral galaxy in the constellation Coma Berenices
- Black eye grease, or Eye black, a black grease applied under the eye to reduce glare
- Black-Eye Griffin, a minor character from Family Guy
- Black Eye Productions, a defunct Canadian comic book publisher
- Mountain blackeye, a species of bird

== See also ==
- The Black Eyed Peas, an American hip-hop and pop group
- Black Eyes (disambiguation)
