= Darkness, Darkness (disambiguation) =

Darkness, Darkness may refer to:

- "Darkness, Darkness", a 1969 song by Jesse Colin Young
- Darkness, Darkness (album), a 1972 album by Phil Upchurch
- Darkness Darkness, a 1980 album by Eric Burdon

== See also ==
- Darkness (disambiguation)
