= Black Eyes =

Black Eyes or Blackeyes may refer to:

- Black Eyes (band), a punk band from Washington, D.C.
- Black Eyes (1936 film), a 1936 film directed by Abdolhossein Sepanta
- Black Eyes (1939 film), a 1939 film directed by Herbert Brenon
- "Black Eyes" (Bradley Cooper song), a 2018 song by Bradley Cooper from A Star Is Born
- "Black Eyes" (Snowden song)
- Colors of the Blind, a 1997 Chinese film sometimes referred to as Black Eyes
- "Dark Eyes" (Russian song) or "Black Eyes", a Russian folk song
- Black Eyes (EP), a 2011 extended play by T-ara
- Blackeyes, a 1987 novel written by Dennis Potter
- Blackeyes (TV series), a 1989 television series based on the above

== See also ==
- Black eye (disambiguation)
- Dark Eye (disambiguation)
- Brown eyes, which are mistakenly seen as being colored black
