= Dharker =

Dharker is an Indian-Pakistan surname. Notable people with the surname include:

- Imtiaz Dharker (born 1954), Pakistani-British poet and filmmaker
- Ayesha Dharker (born 1977), British-Indian actress and daughter of Imtiaz Dharker

== See also ==
- Darker (disambiguation)
