= Dark (surname) =

Dark is a surname. Notable people with the surname include:

- Alice Elliott Dark, American writer
- Alvin Dark (1922–2014), American baseball player and manager
- Ben Dark (born 1972), Australian television presenter
- Benjamin Dark (1793–1836), English cricketer
- Danny Dark (1938–2004), American TV announcer and voice actor
- David Dark, American writer
- Jacqueline Dark (1966–2023), Australian mezzo-soprano
- James Dark, English cricketer
- John Dark, British film and TV producer
- Gregory Dark (born 1957), American film director
- Lisa Lee Dark (born 1981), Welsh opera singer and voice actress

Fictional characters:

- Joanna Dark, the protagonist in the video game Perfect Dark
- Simon Dark, Comics character
