= Darkness (1993 film) =

- 2006 DVD reissue cover showing both cover images
- Directed by: Leif Jonker
- Written by: Leif Jonker
- Produced by: Leif Jonker
- Starring: Gary Miller; Randall Aviks; Mike Gisick; Cena Donham; Steve Brown; Lisa Franz; Bill Hooper
- Cinematography: Leif Jonker
- Edited by: Leif Jonker
- Music by: Michael Curtis; Leif Jonker
- Production company: 13th Dream Entertainment
- Distributed by: Barrel Entertainment
- Release date: 1993
- Running time: 90 minutes
- Country: United States
- Language: English
- Budget: $5,000

Darkness, also known as Darkness: The Vampire Version and Leif Jonker's Darkness, is a 1993 American independent horror film written, produced, edited and directed by Leif Jonker and starring Gary Miller, Randall Aviks and Mike Gisick. The film was heavily circulated on the underground horror circuit and is famous for having a large number of exploding heads in it, more than any previous film of the genre. The special effects were created by Leif Jonker and Miller, who plays a vampire hunter.

== Synopsis ==
When a group of boys come home after a concert they find plenty of reasons to be afraid of the dark. From the shadows of the night a legion of human-like bloodthirsty vampires breaks. The boys arm themselves to the teeth with chainsaws, machetes, guns and holy water. A pitched battle between the living and the undead is prepared. When the dawn is near, all eyes of humanity head towards a face that overwhelms even the dead.

== Cast ==
- Gary Miller as Tobe
- Randall Aviks as Liven
- Mike Gisick as Greg
- Cena Donham as Kelly
- Steve Brown as Jodie
- Lisa Franz as Dianne
- Bill Hooper as Glenn

== Production ==
Jonker wrote the script when he was 17 years old and began production a year later, in 1988. After four days of shooting, he abandoned the production. He returned to it in 1989 with a new cast and a budget under $5000. Jonker finished post-production in 1991, two and a half years after he began it.

== Reception ==
Bloody Disgusting rated it 3/5 stars and called it a "diamond in the rough" that has attained a cult following for its gore. Scott Weinberg of DVD Talk rated it 2/5 stars and wrote, "Lief Jonker's Darkness is one of the cheapest, silliest, and splatteriest no-budget horror flicks you're ever likely to come across.". Brett Cullum of DVD Verdict wrote, "Despite any shortcomings, this is a movie made by horror film fans for their peers. You can feel the passion seeping off the screen, and somehow a movie that should be fodder for the Mystery Science Theater 3000 becomes a rollicking good time."

Horrorhound.com named it "the goriest vampire film of all time".

== See also ==
- Vampire film
