= Darker (video game) =

1995 video game

- Publisher: Psygnosis
- Designers: Jas.C.Brooke; Lyndon Brooke
- Platform: MS-DOS
- Release: 1995
- Genre: Flight simulator
- Mode: Single-player

Darker is a single-player futuristic flight simulator video game published by Psygnosis in 1995 for MS-DOS. The player assumes the role of Tolly, a civilian shuttle pilot in the city of Delphi, the only city situated on the dark side of a planet in synchronous rotation around the local star. The player must defend Delphi from the Halons, inhabitants of the planet's light side, who are invading Delphi. The game takes place over a number of missions on the planet's surface and in tunnels.

The game supports the VFX-1 virtual reality headset.

== Plot ==
Darker's story is revealed over the course of the game as information gathered by reconnaissance. The people of Delphi are not militarised, having never had reason for military action, and so technology for combating the Halon menace is developed over the course of the game. The Halon people are revealed to be invading in order to expand their cities away from the light side, which they have polluted beyond the point where it can sustain life. Eventually Tolly pilots a Halon craft to the light side of the planet, where he destroys the Halon aircraft factories.

== Gameplay ==
The bulk of the game is played piloting a Caero shuttle. Because of the scarcity of energy on the dark side of the planet, power to the shuttle is transmitted wirelessly through a network of pylons situated on a regular grid across the city.

== Reception ==
Reception

Review scores
Publication	Score
Génération 4	1/5
PC Games (DE)	41/100
PC Player	9/100
Power Play	23%
