= Dark (disambiguation) =

Dark most commonly refers to darkness, the absence of light.

Dark or DARK may also refer to:

- Evil, sinister or malign

== People ==
- Dark (surname)

== Entertainment ==
- Dark (TV series), 2017
- Dark (broadcasting), term in broadcasting
- "Dark", TV series episode, see list of Legend of the Seeker episodes
- Dark (video game), a stealth/action video game
- Dark (album), a 2012 album by Hwyl Nofio
- "Dark", song by Prince from Come (Prince album)
- Dark Mousy, a character in the anime D.N.Angel
- G. M. Dark, character from the novel Something Wicked This Way Comes
- Dark, British band that released the 1972 album Dark Round the Edges
- DARK, a criminal organisation featured in the manga and anime Kikaider
- D.A.R.K. (band), U.S. alt-rock band
- Dark series, a paranormal romance novel series
- Dark (film), a 2026 Indian film

== See also ==
- Dark Dark Dark (band) U.S. folk band
- Dərk, Azerbaijan
- Dark data
- Dark Eye (disambiguation)
- Dark triad
- Darke (disambiguation)
- Darker (disambiguation)
- The Dark (disambiguation)
- Dark chocolate
