= Darker =

Darker may refer to:

- Darker (album), a 1997 album by C-Tec
- Darker, a novel by Simon Clark
- Darker (video game), a 1995 computer game by Psygnosis
- Darker (magazine), a Russian horror webzine
- Grant Dooks Darker (1898-1979), mycologists and taxonomist

== See also ==
- Dharker, Indian-Pakistani family-/surname
- Dark (disambiguation)
