= Darke (surname) =

Darke is a surname. Notable people with the surname include:

- Francis Nicholson Darke (1863–1940), Canadian leading citizen of Regina, Saskatchewan, Canada
- Harold Darke (1888–1976), English composer and organist
- Ian Darke, English football and boxing commentator
- John Charles Darke (1806–1844), English-born surveyor and explorer in Van Diemen's Land (now Tasmania ) and South Australia
- Nick Darke (1948–2005), British playwright
- Robert Darke (1876–1961), English cricketer
- General William Darke (1736–1801), American soldier and politician
- William Wedge Darke (1810–1890), Australian colonist and surveyor

Fictional characters:

- Sebastian Darke, the eponymous hero of a series of children's novels written by British author Philip Caveney
