= Darkness (2015 film) =

2015 Serbian film by Jug Radivojević

- Film poster
- Directed by: Jug Radivojević
- Written by: Djordje Milosavljevic
- Starring: Tamara Dragicevic
- Release date: 10 November 2015
- Country: Serbia
- Language: Serbian

Darkness (Serbian: Igra u tami) is a 2015 Serbian drama film directed by Jug Radivojević. It was named as one of five films that could be chosen as the Serbian submission for the Best Foreign Language Film at the 89th Academy Awards, but it was not selected.

== Cast ==
- Tamara Dragicevic as Aska
- Viktor Savic as Vuk
- Vuk Kostic as Obrad
- Vladislava Milosavljevic as Zivana
