= Digital continuity =

Digital continuity is the ability to maintain the digital information of a creator in such a way that the information will continue to be available, as needed, despite changes in digital technology. It focuses on making sure that information is complete, available and therefore usable. Activities involved with managing digital continuity include information management, information risk assessment and managing technical environments, including file format conversion. Digital continuity management is particularly important to organisations that have a duty to maintain accountability, and to act transparently and legally, such as government and infrastructure companies. Digital continuity is also an important issue for organisations responsible for maintaining repositories of information in digital form over time, such as archives and libraries.

== Focus of digital continuity ==
The focus of digital continuity differs from that of digital preservation and business continuity. While there is some overlap among these areas, they should be treated as related but separate issues. Business continuity focuses on making sure that critical business functions will be available to customers, suppliers, regulators, and other entities that must have access to those functions. Digital preservation focuses on long term strategies and requirements for storing digital information in an effort to stabilize the collection of digital records. Digital continuity is concerned with the ability to make digital information continuously usable for as long as required. What constitutes usable will be different depending on each organization's needs. For the purposes of digital continuity, The National Archives believes digital information is usable when one can:

- find it when needed
- open it as needed
- work with it in the way needed
- understand what it is and what it is about
- trust that it is what it says it is.

== Digital continuity projects ==
The National Archives in the United Kingdom began a digital continuity project for public use in 2007. The project is based on a four-stage process for managing digital information effectively in organisations:

- Step 1: Plan for action: All employees in the organization need to be aware of the digital continuity project and have an understanding of what digital continuity means for the information they create. This step also includes assessing existing work practices in order to ensure that people working within the system have the potential to deliver continuity.
- Step 2: Define your digital continuity requirements: Ensure that an effective records management system is in place so that it is understood what information needs to be kept and how it will be used over time, regardless of change.
- Step 3: Assess and manage risks to digital continuity: This step involves a digital continuity risk assessment which highlights areas of concern. This may include identifying file formats in current use which are susceptible to obsolescence. Identifying risks will help mitigate potential problems.
- Step 4: Maintain digital continuity: This step ensures that your organization will be able to continue to use the digital information it produces in the future through changes in technology. This involves embedding the concept of digital continuity into existing business processes.

At Archives New Zealand, the digital continuity project is entitled the Digital Continuity Action Plan. The Archives New Zealand project is focused on ensuring digital information is available in the future, that the information remains authentic and reliable, and that the public has continuous access through a proactive approach to maintaining digital information.

The Digital Preservation Coalition (DPC), which concerns itself with digital preservation issues including digital continuity, has published reports advocating the assessment of digital preservation needs in the UK, and has been consulted in the creation of the Digital Continuity Action Plan at Archives New Zealand. The National Archives is also a member of the DPC.

Other digital continuity projects are underway at the Welsh Assembly Government in conjunction with the University of Wales, Newport., and the National Library of Australia.

== See also ==
- Information Lifecycle Management
- Business continuity
- Digital preservation
- Digital Preservation Coalition
- Digital dark age
- Digital rhetoric
