= World of Darkness (disambiguation) =

World of Darkness is a series of tabletop role-playing games.

World of Darkness may also refer to:

- World of Darkness (Mandaeism), the underworld in Mandaeism
- World of Darkness (video game), a canceled video game
- A World of Darkness, a 1992 game book
- The World of Darkness: Storytelling System Rulebook, a 2004 game book
- World of Darkness, a zoo exhibit at the Bronx Zoo
