= Nokia 1011 =

Cell phone model

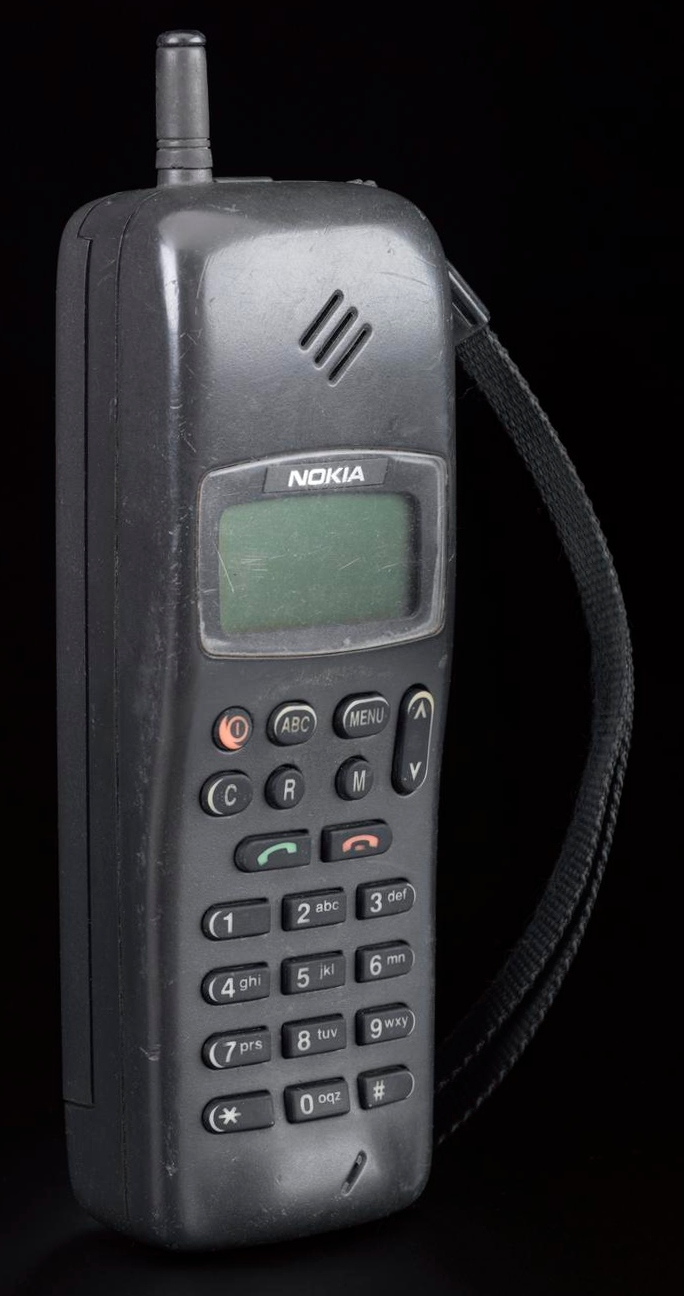
- A Nokia 1011
- Manufacturer: Nokia
- First released: 1992
- Availability by region: 10 November 1992
- Successor: Nokia 2010; Nokia 2110
- Related: Nokia 1610; Mobira Cityman 2000
- Compatible networks: GSM 900
- Form factor: Brick with antenna
- Dimensions: 195 x 60 x 45mm (with standard battery and internal antenna)
- Weight: 495 g (17 oz)
- Operating system: embedded
- Memory: 99-entry Phonebook
- Battery: Ni-CD 7.2V 900 mAh
- Display: 2-line, 8-character monochrome LCD with dedicated function symbols
- Data inputs: Numeric keypad
- Model: NHE-2XN
- Development status: Discontinued, extremely rare

The Nokia 1011 (NHE-2X5, NHE-2XN) is the first mass-produced GSM phone. It was sold also as Mobira Cityman 2000. The typenumber refers to the launch date, 10 November 1992.

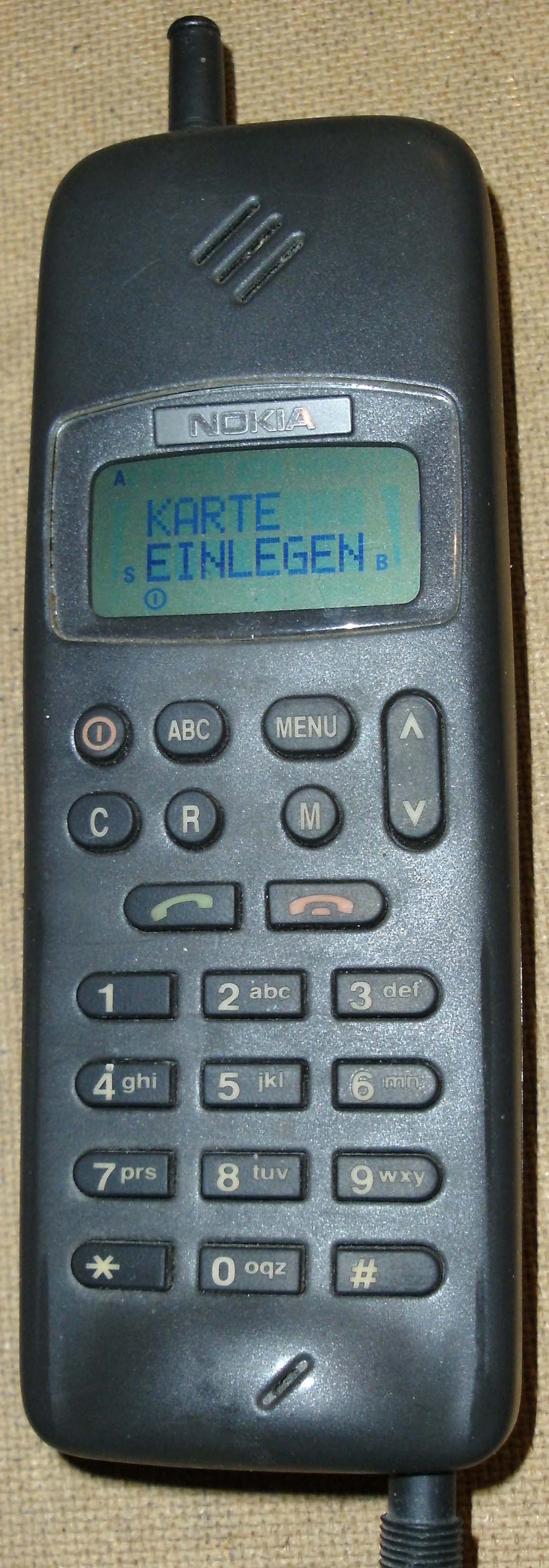
A Nokia 1011

The black handset measured 195 x 60 x 45 mm and featured a monochrome LCD and an extendable antenna. The memory could hold 99 phone numbers. It did not yet employ Nokia's characteristic ringtone: that was only introduced in 1994. The phone operated in the 900 MHz GSM band. At that time the device cost about 2500 DM (about 2120 euros today).

The phone was able to receive SMS messages but not send them.

Nokia 1011 continued production until 1994, when Nokia 2010 and Nokia 2110 were introduced as successors.

Today Nokia 1011 can be found in museum collections, and it is considered to be one of the rarest Nokia phones to find.

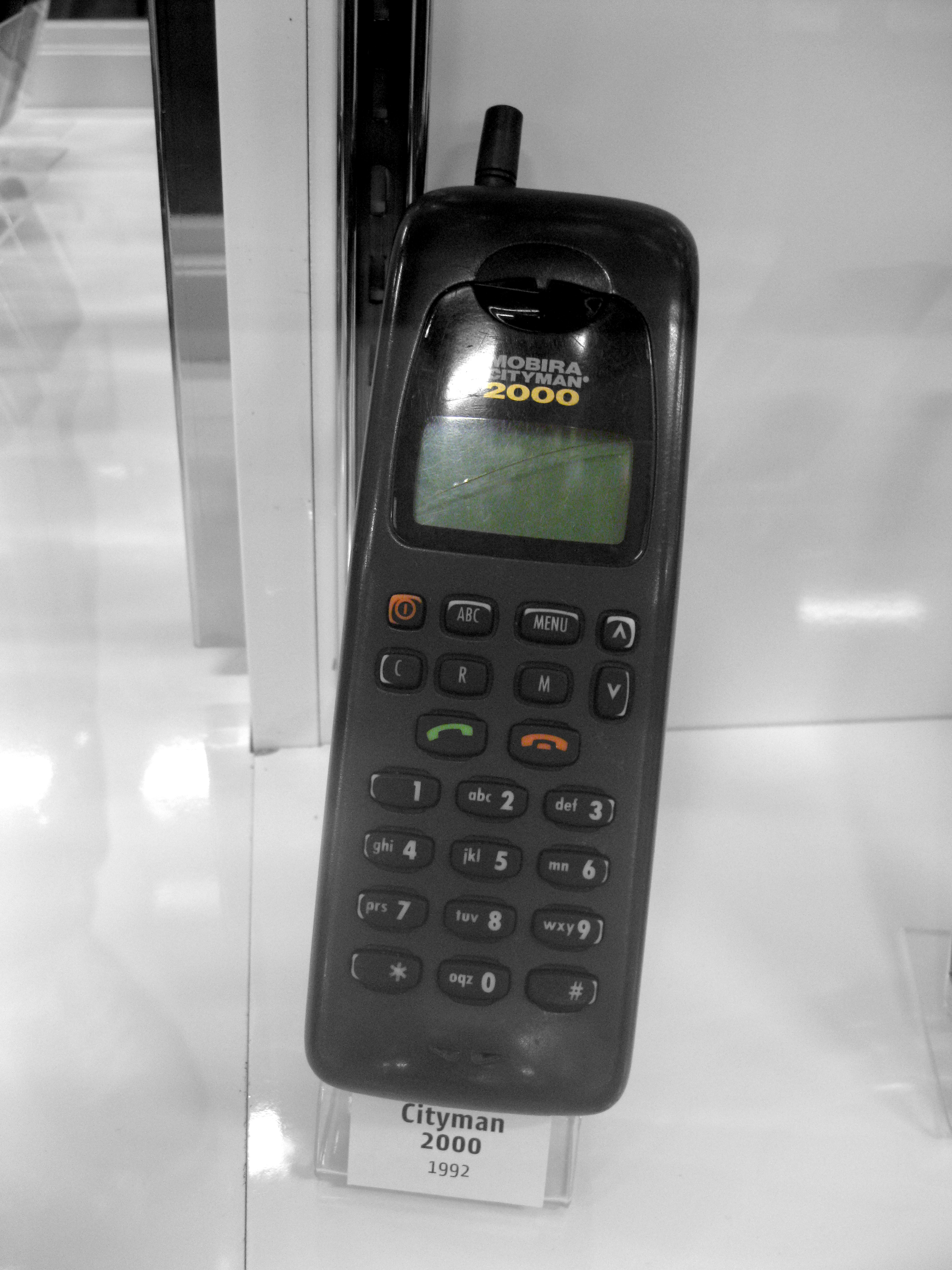
A Mobira Cityman 2000.
