= Nokia 101 (1992) =

1992 mobile phone model

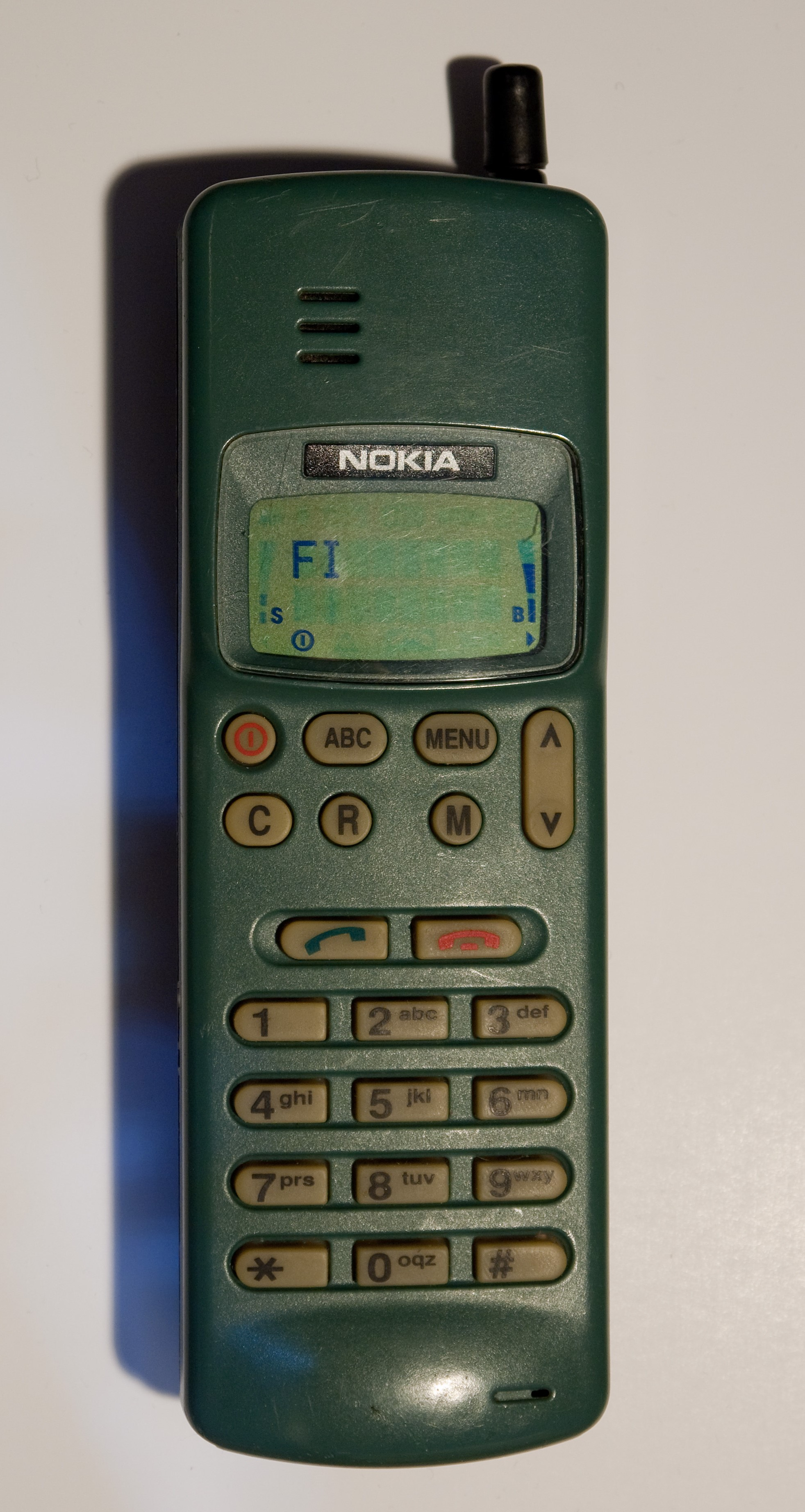
Nokia 101 (1992)

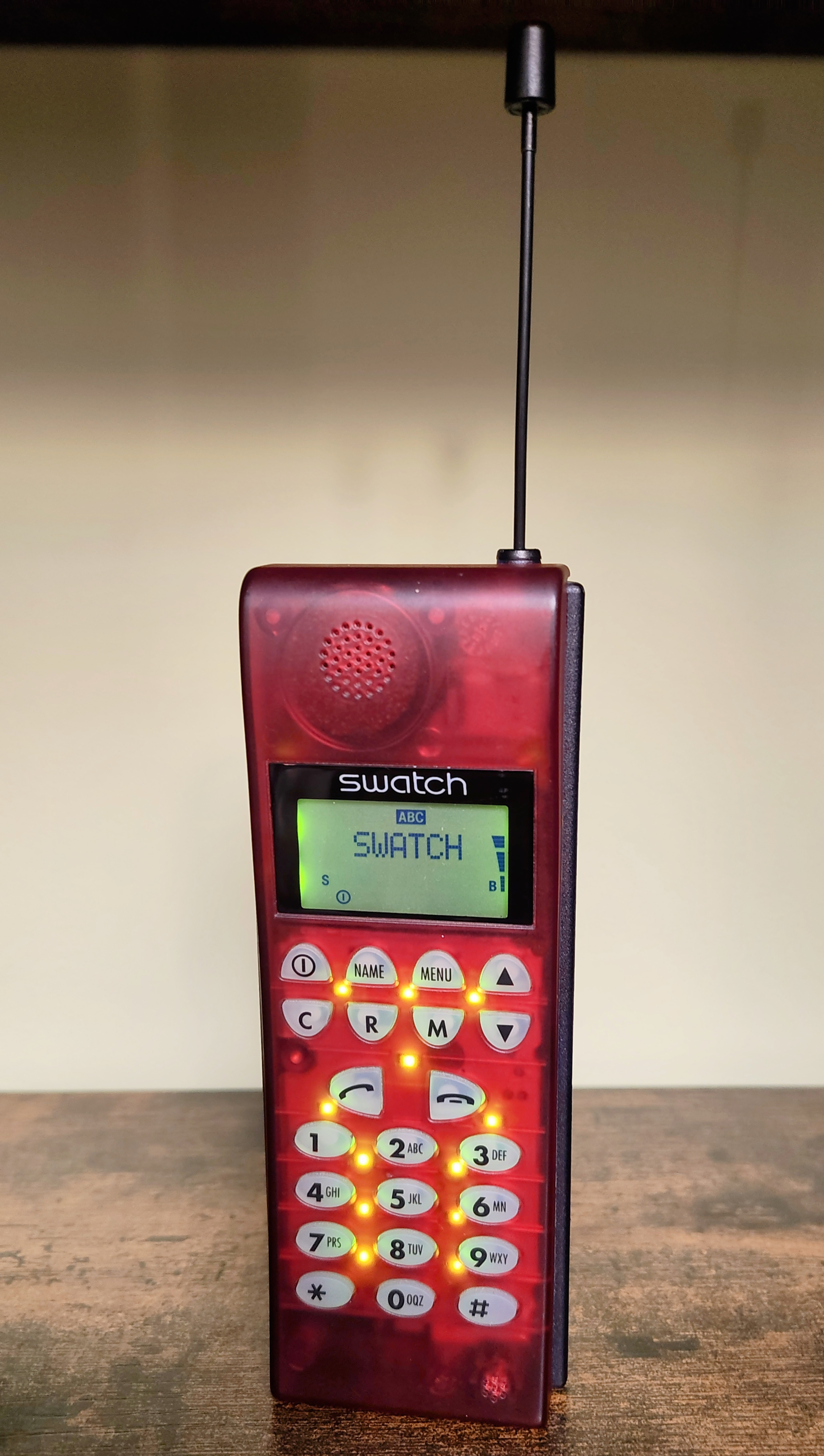
Nokia 101 rebranded as Swatch for the Italian market.

The Nokia 101 is an analogue mobile phone from Nokia released in 1992 that has variants for the NMT, AMPS and ETACS cellular networks. The 101 is considered to have been a significant handset for Nokia, one that started the company's major success in the market that decade. It was the first model in the new 3-digit naming strategy for analogue handsets.

It was also Nokia's first in a candybar form as opposed to the previous "bricks" such as Nokia Talkman 600 or Nokia P4000. It weighed 280 grams, with Nokia marketing it as the world's "most portable phone". The 101 was designed by Frank Nuovo, who would go on to design many other Nokia handsets thereafter. It was specially designed to be easy to use, with well spaced keys that also have backlight for use in the dark. As a result, the 101 became popular.

Nokia would that year launch the Nokia 1011 which is a digital GSM phone. The Nokia 121 was aimed for business markets, and the Nokia 100 was a more simple version for consumers. Other similar models were launched too including Nokia 104 and Nokia 116. In 1994 the Nokia 2110 digital phone was launched.

== See also ==
- Mobile 101
