= Emmett Leahy Award =

Award in information management

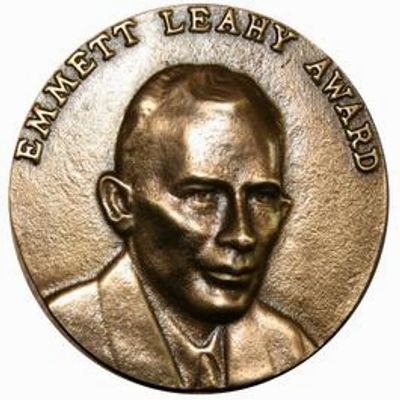
- Country: USA
- Presented by: Emmett Leahy Award Committee
- First award: 1967
- Website: https://emmettleahyaward.org/

The Emmett Leahy Award is given annually to individuals who have had major impact on the field of information management. The award has been given since 1967, and honors Emmett Leahy, a pioneer in records management.

== Introduction ==
The Emmett Leahy Award is an annual award that recognizes an individual whose outstanding contributions have had a major impact on the field of information and records management. First presented in 1967 and given in honor of Emmett J. Leahy (1910-1964), an American pioneer in records management, it is widely regarded as the highest award for individual accomplishment in the field. It is the significance of the individual’s overall impact that sets it apart from other awards, which recognize professional service or are presented to project teams, groups, companies or public organizations. Each year the independent Award Committee, comprising the last ten awardees, selects the recipient based on their creation of original records and information management principles and concepts, their demonstrable and substantive impact on records and information management practices, and their promotion of excellence in the profession through innovative thought leadership and direct engagement in records and information management education.

Recipients have included records managers, archivists, educators, users and consultants from the USA and internationally.

== History of the award ==
The Emmett Leahy Award was created by Rodd Exelbert, founder of the Information and Records Management (IRM) magazine. In 1966 he was looking for a way to spotlight outstanding contributions to the IRM profession through an award when he heard a presentation by Christopher Cameron, Managing Partner of Leahy & Company, at the ARMA Convention in Houston about the work of Emmett J. Leahy. It inspired him to want to name the award after Leahy. Following discussions with Leahy & Company, and gaining the permission of Leahy’s widow Betty, the Emmett Leahy Award, for "a man or woman whose unique contributions to records control, filing, and information retrieval have advanced the information and records management profession", was born. Exelbert convened a committee of IRM experts who worked to develop a set of selection criteria and a list of candidates to evaluate against the criteria. The first award, in the form of a personalised plaque for the recipient to retain, was presented to Ed Rosse, US Social Security Administration, at the 1967 ARMA Annual Meeting.

Exelbert administered the award until 1980 using the IRM magazine to publicize it and solicit nominations, which widened its scope and increased the number of potential candidates. He introduced changes to the process by including at least one Emmett Leahy Award recipient on the selection committee. Around the same time ARMA decided that the award should no longer be presented at its meetings, since it was not involved in the process and were concerned it was competing against its own awards. They asked their official certifying body, the Institute of Certified Records Managers (ICRM), to assume administration of the award. At a meeting in late 1981 the Board of Regents of the ICRM considered this request and established a committee to examine the issue. Over the next three years discussions took place with Leahy Business Archives Inc. and Mrs Betty Leahy White, Emmett Leahy’s widow, about the award’s future administration. Formal delegation of authority was finally secured in 1983 and the award process resumed in 1984 with the next award being made in 1985.

The award has continued to be sponsored but it is the exclusive responsibility of the Emmett Leahy Award Committee to select the annual recipient. Following the initial sponsorship by the publisher of the Information and Records Management Magazine and then the ICRM, Pierce Leahy Archives became the sponsors in the late 1980s followed by Iron Mountain in 2000. Other sponsors have included Huron Consulting Group and Drinker Biddle & Reath LLP. In 2019 Preservica, a digital preservation company, became the award’s sponsor.

== Nomination and selection process ==
The selection of the annual Emmett Leahy Award recipient is the exclusive responsibility of the Emmett Leahy Award Committee. Composed of the previous ten award winners, the Committee is independent and not associated with any other organization.

Any living individual who has had a major impact on the field of records and information management is eligible to be nominated. The Committee identifies potential nominees and nominations may also be submitted to the Committee Chair by any individual, organization, or institution. The Committee reviews all nominations and then invites an agreed final set of nominees who meet the award criteria to submit formal applications.

Individuals invited to apply are asked to submit their application in accordance with the content and format guidance provided on the award website. Since this award honors individuals who have had a significant impact on the records and information management field, applications need to make clear the individual's specific role in bringing about the impacts identified. They must demonstrate the individual's impact in four areas: (i) Program Development and Management, (ii) Innovation, (iii) Education and (iv) Professional and Organizational Leadership.

Each Committee member independently reviews and assesses the submissions of invited applicants against the award criteria. The Committee then meets to discuss each applicant in detail and ranks them to reach their decision about the successful applicant for that year. The Committee’s deliberations are conducted on the basis of objectivity, respect and consensus.

== List of Recipients ==
In reverse chronological order from 1967 to the present day. See the ‘Award Winners’ section of the Emmett Leahy Award website for further details of recipients.

=== 1999 to present ===
Award winners since 1999 are:

Year	Recipient	Country	Position at the time of receiving the award
2026	Jordi Serra Serra	Spain	
2025	Aída Luz Mendoza Navarro	Perú	Director, Archivo General de la Nación (AGN)
2024	Neil Beagrie	United Kingdom	Commissioner (trustee/non-exec) at the Royal Commission on the Ancient and Historical Monuments of Wales (RCAHMW)
2023	Nancy McGovern	United States	Director for Digital Preservation Instruction and Practice, Global Archivist LLC
2022	Joan Boadas	Catalonia	Municipal archivist of Girona
2021	Laura Millar	Canada	Records, archives, and information consultant, independent scholar and author
2020	Dinesh Katre	India	Senior Director & HOD, Human-Centred Design & Computing Group, Centre for Development of Advanced Computing (C-DAC)
2019	Simon Chu	Hong Kong	Advocate for an archives law in Hong Kong
2018	Trudy Peterson	United States	Consulting Archivist
2017	Richard Marciano	United States	Professor, iSchool, University of Maryland
2016	Adrian Brown	United Kingdom	Director, Parliamentary Archives
2015	Victoria Lemieux	Canada	Associate Professor of Archival Studies, iSchool, University of British Columbia
2014	Julie McLeod	United Kingdom	Professor of Records Management, Northumbria University
2013	Galina Datskovsky	United States	Independent Consultant
2012	David Giaretta	United Kingdom	Director, Alliance for Permanent Access
2011	Jason R. Baron	United States	Director of Litigation, National Archives and Records Administration
2010	Adrian Cunningham	Australia	Director, Strategic Relations and Personal Records, National Archives of Australia
2009	Maria Guercio	Italy	Head of the Archival, Library and Information Studies Department and Provost, University of Urbino
2008	Kenneth Thibodeau	United States	Director of the Electronic Records Archives Program, National Archives and Records Administration
2007	Anne Thurston	United Kingdom	International Director, International Records Management Trust
2006	Luciana Duranti	Canada	Professor of Archival Studies, School of Information, University of British Columbia
2005	Charles Dollar	United States	Senior Consultant, Cohasset Associates
2004	Eugenia Brumm	United States	Manager, Records Management, Ross Products, Division of Abbott Laboratories
2003	Bruce Miller	Canada	President, RIMtech
2002	Christine Ardern	Canada	President, Information Management Specialists Consultancy
2001	John T. Phillips	United States	Management Consultant, Information Technology Decisions
2000	Mary F. Robek	United States	Professor Emerita of Administrative Services and Business Education, Eastern Michigan University
1999	John McDonald	Canada	Information Management Consultant and Educator

=== 1985 to 1998 ===
Award winners before 1999 are:

Year	Recipient	Country	Notes
1998	David G. Goodman		Professor, School of Business & Economics at Wisconsin State University
1997	James G. Coulson	United States	Huron Consulting Group
1996	Peter A. Smith	Australia	National records management course; Standards Australia IT/21 Records Management Committee,
1995	Frank B. Evans	United States	National Archives and Records Service; historian, archival/educator, and records manager administrator.
1994	Donald S. Skupsky	United States	President, Information Requirements Clearinghouse
1993	E. Mark Langemo	United States	Professor Emeritus at the University of North Dakota.
1992	Patricia Acton		Records Management and Library Consultant
1991	Robert F. Williams	United States	Founder and President of Cohasset Associates
1990	Ira A. Penn	United States	Senior Management Analyst with the U.S. Federal Government.
1989	Anneliese Arenburg	Canada	Consultant
1988	Fred V. Diers	United States	Consultant
1987	Artel Ricks		Regional Commissioner, National Archives and Records Service (NARS)
1986	John W. Porter		Manager, IBM Records Management
1985	Don M. Avedon		Imaging Consultant

=== 1967 to 1980 ===
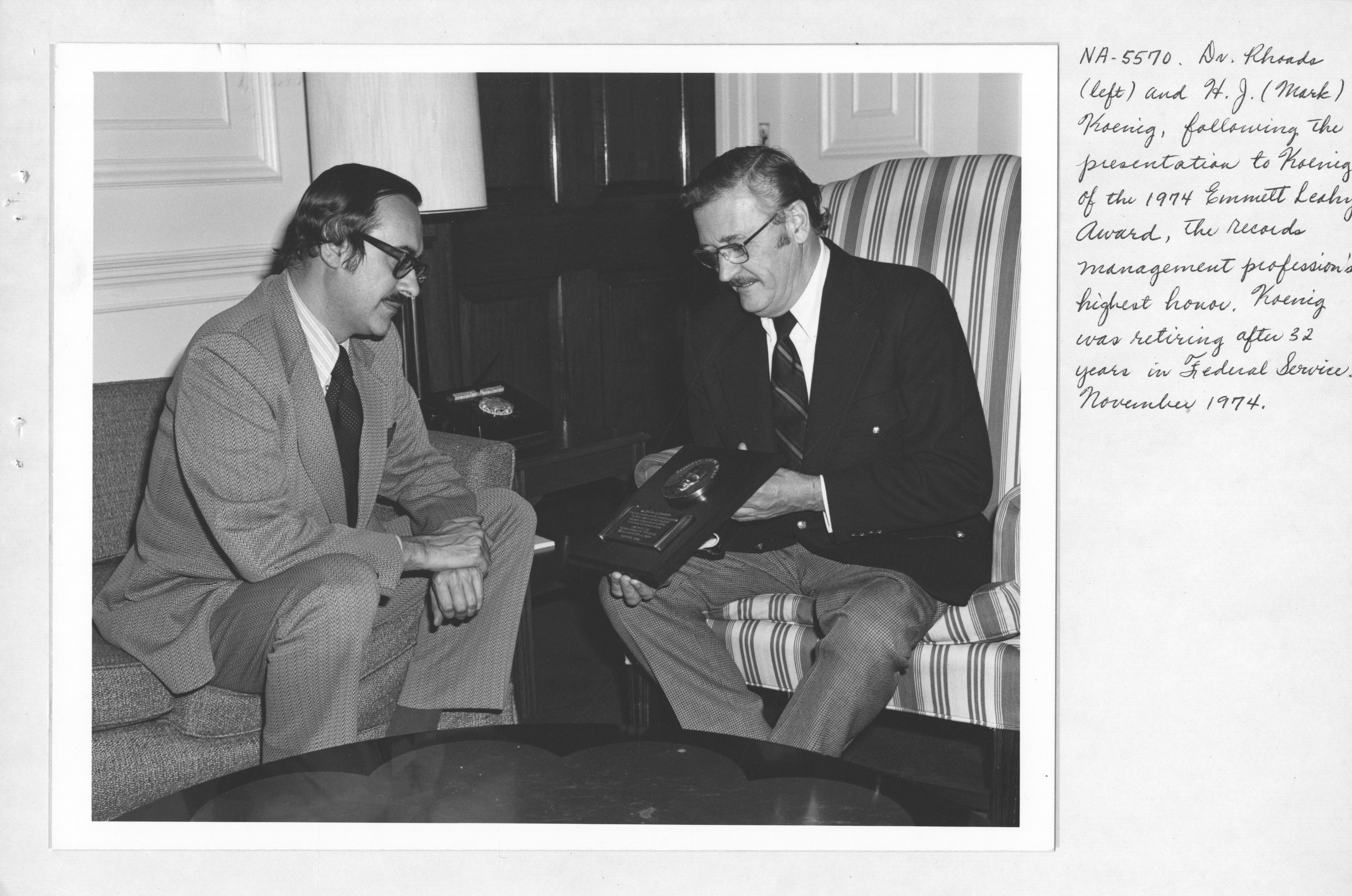
Koenig receiving the award

Year	Recipient	Country	Notes
1980	Gerald F. Brown	United States	Corporate Records Manager Missouri Pacific Railroad
1979	Robert C. Woodall	United States	Chief, Records Management Division, State of California.
1978	Benjamin F. Oliver	United States	Director, Program Evaluation Division, Office of Records Management, National Archives and Records Service
1977	William L. Rofes	United States	Manager-Record Analysis and Control, IBM
1976	Edward Johnson	United States	Chief, Bureau of Archives and Records Management, Florida Department of State
1975	Helen Harden	United States	Corporate Records Manager, Frito-Lay
1974	Harold J. "Mark" Koenig	United States	Assistant Archivist for Records Management, National Archives and Records Service
1973	Donald F. Evans	United States	Records Manager, Union Oil Company of California. ARMA International President 1970-1971
1972	William Warren	United States	Supervising Management Analyst, Port Authority of New York and New Jersey
1971	Loretta Kiersky	United States	Director, Central Research Library, Air Reduction Company
1970	Charles MacBeth	United States	Manager, Corporate Records Management, Hughes Aircraft Company.
1969	Everett O. Alldredge	United States	Assistant Archivist for Records Management at the National Archives and Records Service
1968	William Benedon	United States	Director, Corporate Administration Services, Lockheed Corporation
1967	Edward Rosse	United States	Supervising social insurance operations analyst of the Social Security Administration

== See also ==
- Records management
- Archival science
- Information management
- Digital curation
- Digital preservation
