= David Carpenter (historian) =

British historian (born 1947)

Academic background
- Education: University of Oxford
- Thesis: Sheriffs of Oxfordshire and their subordinates, 1194–1236: a study in politics, patronage and society (1973)
- Doctoral advisor: J. O. Prestwich
- Influences: J. C. Holt

Academic work
- Discipline: History
- Sub-discipline: Medieval history
- Institutions: King's College London
- Doctoral students: Sophie T. Ambler; Jane Winters

David A. Carpenter (born 1947) is an English historian and writer, and Professor of Medieval History at King's College London where he has been working since 1988. Carpenter specialises in the life and reign of Henry III. Historian Dan Jones described him as "one of Britain's foremost medievalists".

== Early life and education ==
He is the son of Rev. E. F. Carpenter, ecclesiastical historian and Dean of Westminster Abbey between 1974 and 1986, and Lillian Carpenter.

David Carpenter attended Westminster School and Christ Church, Oxford. He completed his doctorate at Oxford under the supervision of J. O. Prestwich. Carpenter decided to specialise in medieval history after reading William Stubbs' Selected Charters.

== Career ==
Carpenter has worked at King's College London since 1988, and now serves as Professor of Medieval History.

Carpenter has written widely on English social, economic, architectural, military and political history in the thirteenth century; many of his essays on this subject being brought together in a volume of his collected papers The Reign of Henry III (Hambledon, 1996).

Between 2005 and 2011, Carpenter directed a major AHRC-funded project on the Fine rolls of Henry III.

Carpenter was a Co-Investigator of the AHRC-funded project 'The Paradox of Medieval Scotland, 1093–1286' which ran from 2007 to 2010. The collaboration between researchers at the universities of Glasgow, Edinburgh, and KCL created a database of all people in Scotland between 1093 and 1286 for whom there are records.

In 2020, Carpenter published the first part of a two-volume biography of Henry III, which had been in preparation for 30 years. Dan Jones described the book as "a fine, judicious, illuminating work that should be the standard study of the reign for generations to come". The second volume, covering the years 1258 to 1272, was published in 2023.

== Filmography ==
In 2003, David A. Carpenter served as a historical advisor in all four episodes of the four-part series Warrior Challenge which aired on PBS.

In 2004, Carpenter appeared on the third episode of Weapons That Made Britain, hosted by Mike Loades.

== Selected publications ==
=== Books ===
- The Battles of Lewes and Evesham (1987)
- The Minority of Henry III (1990)
- The Reign of Henry III (1996)
- The Struggle for Mastery: Britain 1066–1284 (2003)
- Magna Carta (2015)
- Henry III: The Rise to Power and Personal Rule, 1207–1258 (2020)
- Henry III: Reform, Rebellion, Civil War, Settlement, 1258-1272 (2023)

=== Articles ===
- 'A Noble in Politics: Roger Mortimer', Nobles and Nobility, ed. A.Duggan (Woolbridge, 2000)
- 'Westminster Abbey in Politics, 1258–1269', Thirteenth Century England VIII, ed. M. Prestwich, R. Britnell, and R. Frame (Woodbridge, 2001)
- 'Thomas Fitz-Thomas', Oxford Dictionary of National Biography, (Woodbridge, 2001)
- 'King Henry III and Saint Edward the Confessor : The origin of the Cult', English Historical Review, vol.CXXII, no. 498 (2007)
- 'King Henry III and the Chapter House of Westminster Abbey', Westminster Abbey Chapter House: the History, Art and Architecture of A Chapter House Beyond Compare, ed. W. Rodwell (London, 2010)
- 'Archbishop Langton and Magna Carta: His Contribution, his Doubts and his Hypocrisy', English Historical Review, vol. CXXXVI, no. 522 (2011)
- 'Crucifixion and Conversion: King Henry III and the Jews in 1255', Laws, lawyers and Texts, Studies in Medieval Legal History in Honour of Paul Brand, (Leiden, 2012)
- 'Henry III and the Sicilian Affair', Fine of the Month (November 2012)
- 'The vis et volunta of King Henry III: The Downfall and Punishment of Robert de Ros', Fine of the Month (November 2012)
- 'Magna Carta 1253: The Ambitions of the Church and the Divisions within the Realm', Historical Research, vol. 86, no. 232 (2013)

=== Collaborations ===
- David Carpenter and James Kanter, 'King Henry III and Windsor Castle', St George's Chapel : History and Heritage, ed. Nigel Saul and T. Tatton-Brown (Stanbridge, 2010)
