= Laura Miller =

Laura Miller may refer to:

- Laura Miller (politician), mayor of Dallas, Texas from 2002 to 2007
- Laura Miller (anthropologist) (born 1953), American anthropologist who specialises in linguistic anthropology and Japan studies
- Laura Miller (Matlock), a character in the TV series Matlock
- Laura Miller (journalist) (born 1980), broadcast journalist in Scotland
- Laura Miller (writer), author, journalist and co-founder of Salon.com
- Laura Miller (footballer) (born 2001), Luxembourger footballer
- Laura Miller (mathematical biologist), American professor of mathematics
- Laura Marie Miller, the birth name of the activist better known as Rosebud Abigail Denovo

== See also ==
- Laura Millar, archivist
