= Digital Preservation Award =

The Digital Preservation Award is an international award sponsored by the Digital Preservation Coalition. The award 'recognises the many new initiatives being undertaken in the challenging field of digital preservation'. It was inaugurated in 2004 and was initially presented as part of the Institute of ConservationConservation Awards. Since 2012 the prize, which includes a trophy and a cheque, is presented independently. Awards ceremonies have taken place at the British Library, the British Museum and the Wellcome Trust.

== Winners and shortlisted entries ==
=== 2004 ===
==== Winner ====
- The Digital Archive: The National Archives of the United Kingdom

==== Shortlisted ====
- The CAMiLEON Project: University of Leeds & University of Michigan (Special Commendation)
- JISC Continuing Access and Digital Preservation Strategy: Jisc
- Preservation Metadata Extraction Tool: National Library of New Zealand
- Wellcome Library/JISC Web Archiving Project: Wellcome Library & Jisc

=== 2005 ===
==== Winner ====
- PREMIS (Preservation Metadata: Implementation Strategies): PREMIS Working Group

==== Shortlisted ====
- Choosing the optimal digital preservation strategy: Vienna University of Technology
- Digital Preservation Testbed: National Archives of the Netherlands
- Reverse Standards Conversion: British Broadcasting Corporation
- UK Web Archiving Consortium

=== 2007 ===
==== Winner ====
- Active Preservation at The National Archives - PRONOM Technical Registry and DROID file format identification tool: The National Archives of the United Kingdom

==== Shortlisted ====
- LIFE: British Library
- Web Curator Tool software development project: National Library of New Zealand & British Library
- PARADIGM (The Personal Archives Accessible in Digital Media): Bodleian Library, University of Oxford, & John Rylands University Library, University of Manchester
- Digital Repository Audit and Certification: Center for Research Libraries, RLG-OCLC, NARA, Digital Curation Centre, Digital Preservation Europe and NESTOR

=== 2010 ===
==== Winner ====
- The Memento Project: Time Travel for the Web : Old Dominion University and the Los Alamos National Laboratory in the United States

==== Shortlisted ====
- Web Continuity: ensuring access to online government information, from The National Archives UK
- PLATO 3: Preservation Planning made simple from Vienna University of Technology and the PLANETS Project
- The Blue Ribbon Task Force on Sustainable Digital Preservation and Access
- Preserving Virtual Worlds, University of Illinois at Urbana Champaign with Rochester Institute of Technology, University of Maryland, Stanford University and Linden Lab in the United States

=== 2012 ===
==== Winner - outstanding contribution to teaching and communication in digital preservation in the last 2 years ====
- The Digital Preservation Training Programme, University of London Computing Centre

==== Shortlisted - outstanding contribution to teaching and communication in digital preservation in the last 2 years ====
- The Signal, Library of Congress
- Keeping Research Data Safe Project, Charles Beagrie Ltd and partners
- Digital Archaeology Exhibition, Story Worldwide Ltd

==== Winner - outstanding contribution to research and innovation in digital preservation in the last two years ====
- The PLANETS Project Preservation and Long-term Access through Networked Services, The Open Planets Foundation and partners

==== Shortlisted - outstanding contribution to research and innovation in digital preservation in the last two years ====
- Data Management Planning Toolkit, The Digital Curation Centre and partners
- TOTEM Trustworthy Online Technical Environment Metadata Registry, University of Portsmouth and partners
- The KEEP Emulation Framework, Koninklijke Bibliotheek (National Library of the Netherlands) and partners

==== Winner - most outstanding contribution to digital preservation in the last decade ====
- The Archaeology Data Service at the University of York

==== Shortlisted - most outstanding contribution to digital preservation in the last decade ====
- The International Internet Preservation Consortium
- The National Archives for the PRONOM and DROID services
- The PREMIS Preservation Metadata Working Group for the PREMIS Standard

=== 2014 ===
==== Winner - OPF Award for Research and Innovation ====
- bwFLA Functional Long Term Archiving and Access by the University of Freiburg and partners

==== Shortlisted - OPF Award for Research and Innovation ====
- Jpylyzer by the KB (National Library of the Netherlands) and partners
- The SPRUCE Project by The University of Leeds and partners

==== Winner - NCDD Award for Teaching and Communications ====
- Practical Digital Preservation: a how to guide for organizations of any size by Adrian Brown

==== Shortlisted - NCDD Award for Teaching and Communications ====
- Skilling the Information Professional by Aberystwyth University
- Introduction to Digital Curation: An open online UCLeXtend Course by University College London

==== Winner - Award for the Most Distinguished Student Work in Digital Preservation ====
- Game Preservation in the UK by Alasdair Bachell, University of Glasgow

==== Shortlisted - Award for the Most Distinguished Student Work in Digital Preservation ====
- Voices from a Disused Quarry by Kerry Evans, Ann MacDonald and Sarah Vaughan, University of Aberystwyth and partners
- Emulation v Format Conversion by Victoria Sloyan, University College London

==== Winner - Award for Safeguarding the Digital Legacy ====
- Carcanet Press Email Archive, University of Manchester

==== Shortlisted - Award for Safeguarding the Digital Legacy ====
- Conservation and Re-enactment of Digital Art Ready-Made, by the University of Freiburg and Rhizome
- Inspiring Ireland, Digital Repository of Ireland and Partners
- The Cloud and the Cow, Archives and Records Council of Wales

=== 2016 ===
==== Winner - SSI Award for Research and Innovation ====
- NCDD and NDE, ‘Constructing a network of nationwide facilities together.’

==== Winner - NCDD Award for Teaching and Communications ====
- The National Archives and The Scottish Council on Archives: ‘Transforming Archives/Opening Up Scotland’s Archives.’

==== Winner - Award for the Most Distinguished Student Work in Digital Preservation ====
- Anthea Seles, University College London and ‘The Transferability of Trusted Digital Repository Standards to an East African context.’

==== Winner - The National Archives Award for Safeguarding the Digital Legacy ====
- Amsterdam Museum and Partners, ‘The Digital City revives: A case study of web archaeology.’

==== Winner - DPC Award for the Most Outstanding Digital Preservation Initiative in Industry ====
- HSBC, 'The Global Digital Archive'

==== DPC Fellowship ====
- Brewster Kahle, the Internet Archive

==== Full List of Finalists 2016 ====
- List of Finalists

=== 2018 ===
==== Winner - Software Sustainability Institute Award for Research and Innovation ====
- ePADD, University of Stanford

==== Shortlisted - Software Sustainability Institute Award for Research and Innovation ====
- VeraPDF, Open Preservation Foundation
- Contributions towards Defining the Discipline, Sarah Higgins - Aberystwyth University
- Flashback: Preservation of legacy digital collections, British Library

==== Winner - DPC Award for Teaching and Communications ====
- The Archivist’s Guide to KryoFlux, Universities of Texas, Duke, Los Angeles, Yale and Emory

==== Shortlisted - DPC Award for Teaching and Communications ====
- Evidence-based postgraduate education in digital information management, University College Dublin
- Leren Preserveren (Learning Digital Preservation), Digital Heritage Network and Het Nieuwe Instituut
- Ibadan/Liverpool Digital Curation Curriculum Review Project, Universities of Ibadan and Liverpool

==== Winner - National Records of Scotland Award for the Most Distinguished Student Work in Digital Preservation ====
- 'Navigating the PDF/A Standard: A Case Study of Theses' by Anna Oates, University of Illinois at Urbana-Champaign

==== Shortlisted - National Records of Scotland Award for the Most Distinguished Student Work in Digital Preservation ====
- 'Preserving the past: the challenge of digital archiving within a Scottish Local Authority' by Lorraine Murray, University of Glasgow
- 'Essay on the record-making and record-keeping issues implicit in Wearables' by Philippa Turner, University of Liverpool

==== Winner - Open Data Institute Award for the Most Outstanding Digital Preservation Initiative in Commerce, Industry and the Third sector ====
- Archiving Crossrail - Europe’s largest infrastructure project, Crossrail and Transport for London

==== Shortlisted - Open Data Institute Award for the Most Outstanding Digital Preservation Initiative in Commerce, Industry and the Third sector ====
- Music Treasures, Stichting Omroep Muziek (SOM)
- Heritage preservation of contemporary dance and choreography through research and innovation in digital documentation and annotation of creative processes, ICKamsterdam and Motion Bank

==== Winner - The National Archives Award for Safeguarding the Digital Legacy ====
- IFI Open Source tools: IFIscripts/ Loopline project, IFI Irish Film Archive

==== Shortlisted - The National Archives Award for Safeguarding the Digital Legacy ====
- Cloud-Enabled Preservation of Life in the 20th Century White House, White House Historical Association Digital Library
- Design, Deliver, Embed: Establishing Digital Transfer in Parliament, UK Parliamentary Archives
- Local Authority Digital Preservation Consortium: Dorset History Centre, West Sussex Records Office, Wiltshire & Swindon History Centre

==== DPC Fellowship ====
- Barbara Sierman, KB Netherlands

== See also ==
- List of computer science awards
- Digital preservation
- Digital Preservation Coalition
