= Adrian Brown (archivist) =

British archivist

- Born: 1969 (age 56–57); London, United Kingdom
- Occupation: Archivist
- Known for: PRONOM / DROID software Practical Digital Preservation (2013)

Adrian Brown (born 1969) is a British archivist specializing in digital records preservation. He led development of the widely used PRONOM file format registry and associated DROID software tool. He is the author of Practical Digital Preservation: A How-To Guide for Organizations of Any Size (2013).

== Career ==
Adrian Brown was born in 1969 in London, England. He attended Durham University, and in 1991 graduated with a BA in Medieval Literature. He became a professional archaeological excavator, and participated in several projects at sites in the United Kingdom. In 1994 he joined the English Heritage Centre for Archaeology in Portsmouth as an assistant records manager. He was promoted to information manager and then to head of information management and collections. He became involved in the field of long-term digital preservation, and in 2000 published a digital archiving strategy for English Heritage, which he used as the basis for developing the digital archiving infrastructure for the agency. This included a registry of digital formats, and processes for automatically characterizing records at time of ingest, including format identification, metadata extraction and fixity checking. It also supported migration from one format to another.

In 2002 Brown moved to The National Archives (TNA) as a digital archives analyst in the Digital Preservation Department. He developed the digital repository for TNA based on the work he had done for English Heritage. He led the development of the PRONOM file format registry and the associated DROID (Digital Record Object IDentification) software tool. PRONOM and DROID were made freely available, and are used by the main open source and commercial digital repository systems worldwide.

In 2003 Brown established the UK Government Web Archive. As of 2016 the Web Archive held more than one billion archived web pages. It was accessed by about 20 million users monthly. Brown was promoted to head of digital preservation in 2005, with responsibility for preserving digital records of the government and courts of the United Kingdom over the long term.

Brown left TNA in 2009 and joined the Parliamentary Archives as head of preservation and access. He became director of Parliamentary Archives in 2013. He developed a new digital repository for the Archives to preserve the records created in digital format, including web pages, and to make them freely available to the public. He also launched a program to digitize and preserve paper records.

== Other professional activities ==
Brown has given many lectures and published many articles on the subject of digital preservation. From 2005 to 2009 he was a board member of the Digital Preservation Coalition. He was one of the founders and contributors to Preservation and Long-term Access through Networked Services (Planets) project, a 4-year digital preservation project for the European Union that ended in 2010. In 2012 Brown joined the board of trustees for The International Records Management Trust. He has participated in different roles in organizations such as the UK Web Archive consortium, British Standards Technical Committee IDT/1/2, ARMA International Standards Task Force ANSI/ARMA-16-200X and UNESCO.

== Recognition ==
Brown has been recognized for his contributions as a digital preservation team member at the TNA and Planets Project. In In 2007, under Brown's leadership, Pronom and DROID won the biennial Digital Preservation Award from the Digital Preservation Coalition. In 2011 the Queen's Award For Excellence in Innovation was given to the Safety Deposit Box Project, which Brown led as a joint project between TNA and Tessella. The Digital Preservation Coalition presented him for the NCDD Award for Teaching and Communications for his 2013 book Practical digital preservation. In 2015 he received the Emmett Leahy Award for innovation, dedication and excellence in records and information management.

== Publications ==
Brown's 2013 Practical Digital Preservation: A How-To Guide for Organizations of Any Size has been described as "an excellent resource for any archivist interested in digital preservation ... vastly informative for administrators involved in developing policies ..." Other publications include:

- A Brown (2003), Digital preservation guidance note 2: Selecting storage media for long-term preservation, The National Archives of England, Wales and the United Kingdom, p. 21
- A Brown (2003), "Preserving the digital heritage: building a digital archive for UK Government records", Online Information - International Meeting, pp. 85–88
- A Brown (2003), "Selecting storage media for long-term preservation", Digital Preservation Guidance Note 2, p. 14
- A Brown (2005), "Automating preservation: New developments in the PRONOM service", RLG DigiNews, vol. 9, no. 2, p. 19, ISSN 1093-5371
- A Brown (2006), Archiving websites: a practical guide for information management professionals, Facet publishing, p. 131
- A Brown (2006), "Automatic format identification using PRONOM and DROID", Digital Preservation Technical Paper 1, p. 24
- A Brown (2006), The PRONOM PUID Scheme: A scheme of persistent unique identifiers for representation information, London: The National Archives, p. 14
- A Brown (2007), Developing practical approaches to active preservation, p. 30
- T Brody; L Carr; J Hey; A Brown; S Hitchcock (2008), "PRONOM-ROAR: Adding format profiles to a repository registry to inform preservation services", International Journal of Digital Curation, vol. 2, no. 2, p. 41
- A Brown (2008), Selecting file formats for long-term preservation, The National Archives, p. 26
- A Brown (2013), Practical digital preservation: a how-to guide for organizations of any size, Facet Publishing, p. 72

== Sources ==
- "Adrian Brown", Google Scholar
- Jansen, Adam (26 April 2019), "Adrian Brown (1969– )", in Duranti, Luciana; Franks, Patricia C. (eds.), Encyclopedia of Archival Writers, 1515-2015, Rowman & Littlefield Publishers, ISBN 978-1-5381-2580-9
- Mircea, Gabriela (2013), "Book Notice: Practical Digital Preservation...", Archivaria, The Journal of the Association of Canadian Archivists, pp. 155–157
- Thurston, Anne (2016), Presentation of the 2016 Emmett Leahy Award to Adrian Brown, Emmett Leahy Award
