= NPO =

NPO may refer to:

== Medicine ==
- Nil per os, Latin for 'nothing by mouth', a medical instruction to withhold oral intake of food and fluids
- neurogenic pulmonary oedema

== Science ==
- North Pacific Oscillation, a teleconnection pattern in atmospheric conditions over the North Pacific
- NP optimization problem, an optimization problem that is NP-hard
- NPO, characterizing thermal stability of a capacitor
- The NPO complexity class, standing for "NP-optimization problem", in computational complexity

== Organisations ==
- Nonprofit organization
- National Portfolio Organisation, a UK-based culture and arts organisation receiving substantial funding from Arts Council England
- National Ports Organisation, former part of the UK Department for Transport
- National Preservation Office, part of the British Library
- Scientific Production Association (Nauchno-Proizvodstvennoye Obyedineniye, Научно-производственное объединение), a form of scientific research-to-production facility in the Soviet Union and the Russian Federation.
- Nederlandse Publieke Omroep ('Netherlands Public Broadcasting'), governing body of the Netherlands (Dutch) Public Broadcasting System
- Nederlands Publieke Omroepbestel ('Dutch public broadcasting system'), the public broadcasting service in the Netherlands
- Netherlands Pathfinder Organisation (Nederlandse Padvinders Organisatie), one of the organisations that evolved into Scouting Nederland, the national Scouting organisation
- NPO UK Ltd., a chain of stationery and book shops in Northern Ireland, now part of Eason & Son
- National Printing Office, one of the three recognized government printers of the Philippines
- National Parents Organization, non-profit charitable and educational organization in the United States that promotes shared parenting.

== Other ==
- Nanga Pinoh Airport, Indonesia (IATA code)
- Pochuri language, of Nagaland, India (ISO 639 code)
