= Lockheed Martin Transportation & Security Solutions =

Lockheed Martin Transportation and Security Solutions (LMTSS) is a Lockheed Martin business unit, formed of the combination of Lockheed Martin's Air Traffic Management (LMATM) unit with several other Systems Integration business units. LMTSS concentrates on Air Traffic Management and security-centric programs that involve large scale systems integration and transformational solutions.

LMTSS is based in Rockville, Maryland, USA, with other major offices in Eagan, Minnesota, USA; Atlantic City, New Jersey, USA and Swanwick, Hampshire, England and with many smaller offices in the United States and Great Britain.

== History ==
LMTSS was preceded by LMATM, which started as a campus of IBM Federal Systems. When the Federal Aviation Administration (FAA) awarded the contract of the Advanced Automation System (AAS) to IBM Federal Systems, the work was performed at a newly constructed campus in Rockville, Maryland. Due to AAS's large size, the entire campus became involved in the program. During the program's development, the campus became specialized in air traffic control programs. This would lead the campus to become a division that worked almost exclusively with the FAA and other civil air authorities like the United Kingdom's National Air Traffic Services (NATS).

In 1994, IBM was in financial difficulties. This led newly hired CEO Lou Gerstner to raise cash and rid IBM of business that was unprofitable or "not in the hardware and services paradigm". IBM Federal Systems was one of the few IBM operating units that was profitable and for which buyers could be found. The unit was sold to Loral Corporation, becoming Loral Federal Systems. In 1996, Lockheed Martin acquired Loral's Federal Systems, defense, and SI business units for $9,100,000. The Federal Systems Rockville campus was merged with other air traffic management businesses within the newly formed Lockheed Martin Federal Systems to become Lockheed Martin Air Traffic Management.

During this phase of mergers and acquisitions, the AAS program ran into troubles due to a variety of large scale integration and requirements issues. The program was canceled and restarted twice, first in 1994 and later in 1996. The program was eventually canceled by the FAA at Lockheed Martin's request. Parts of the AAS system were spun off into the much more successful Display System Replacement (DSR) and HOST Replacement programs in 1998 and 1999. LMATM also built the New En Route Centre (NERC) in 1998 and Air Traffic Control centers in Taiwan, Argentina, and South Korea.

By the year 2000, the company had become profitable with these and other ATC programs. Between 2000 and 2003, the company was baseline profitable. The company dealt with the loss of the New Scottish Centre (NSC) contract due to NATS and FAA budget cutbacks. Moderate layoffs were made in order to reduce head-count and keep the business unit out of debt.

In 2002 and 2003, The newly formed United States Department of Homeland Security started spending billions of dollars on large security-centric programs. Traditional defense and government contractors started compete vigorously for these programs. Lockheed Martin followed suit by reorganizing their Systems Integration business unit. Parts of the company that were not strictly focused on the United States Department of Defense were moved around to units that competed in the private sector or for civilian government programs. The LMATM unit was merged with the security-based groups whose customers were the U.S. Customs and Border Protection, the Central Intelligence Agency, U.S. and Canadian Census agencies, and other such organizations. The modified company was renamed Lockheed Martin Transportation and Security Solutions.

In August 2005, Lockheed Martin TSS was awarded a $212 million contract by the New York State MTA for a security system to protect Mass Transit operations in New York City, to include subways, commuter railroads and bridges and tunnels.

In September 2005, Lockheed Martin TSS was awarded a $308 million contract by the National Archives and Records Administration to design and develop the Electronic Records Archives (ERA) program. The ERA will be a project ensuring the safe storage and recall of the federal government's electronic records, regardless of format, for "the life of the republic."

Effective January 1, 2009, Lockheed Martin TSS was dissolved and the business was realigned within the Lockheed Martin IS&GS (Information Systems & Global Solutions) business area. Secure enterprise solutions (SES) programs became a part of Lockheed Martin IS&GS-Civil and the heritage aviation programs became part of Lockheed Martin IS&GS Internal & Next Generation. In mid-January, that latter unit was renamed Lockheed Martin IS&GS Global. However, after the departure of the Global business unit president, Judy Marks, the unit was realigned again. The aviation programs joined the rest of the former TSS programs, and now report under IS&GS-Civil.
