= Kenneth Thibodeau =

- Born: 1945 (age 79–80); Cohoes, New York, United States
- Occupation: Records management expert
- Known for: DoD 5015.03 standard

Kenneth Francis Thibodeau (born 1945) is an American specialist in electronic records management who worked for many years at the National Archives and Records Administration (NARA). He was responsible for development of the pioneering DoD 5015.02 standard for electronic records management and for creation of NARA's Electronic Records Archives System (ERA).

== Life ==
=== Background ===
Kenneth Thibodeau was born in Cohoes, New York, United States, in 1945. He studied at Fordham University, where he received a bachelor's degree in history in 1967. He also studied at the University of Strasbourg in France. He went on to the University of Pennsylvania, where he obtained a PhD in history and sociology of science in 1974.

=== Professional career ===
In 1975 Charles M. Dollar hired Thibodeau to work in NARA's Machine Readable Archives Division. He joined a team that reviewed the electronic records of federal agencies to ensure they could be archived by NARA. He left NARA in 1978 to work as a records management officer and privacy act officer at the National Institutes of Health (NIH). He worked on office automation practices and strategic planning for management of information resources. In 1982 he was appointed head of the NIH Records Management Branch.

In 1988 Thibodeau returned to NARA and until 1995 was director of NARA's Center of Electronic Records. He played a central role in developing the partnerships between several archival organizations and the San Diego Supercomputer Center. In 1996 he was detailed to the Department of Defense. At the Office of the Secretary of Defense he led the development of the 5015.2-STD Design Criteria Standard for Electronic Records Management Software Applications, the first such standard to be published.

From 1996 to 1998 Thibodeau was deputy director of NARA's Modern Records Program. From 1998 to 2009 he was director of NARA's Electronic Records Archives Program, authorized by John W. Carlin, the archivist of the United States. The Electronic Records Archives (ERA) System went live in 2008, and by 2011 held about 100 terabytes of records in electronic form. Thibodeau then became director of NARAs Center for Advanced Systems and Technology. He retired in 2011.

=== Society of American Archivists ===
As a member of the Society of American Archivists, from 1992 to 1993 Thibodeau was a member of the Standards Committee, in 1995 he was co-chair of the Committee on Education, from 1998 to 2000 he was a member of the Committee on Automated Records and Techniques, and in 2011 he was a member of the Program Committee. In December 2011 he was nominated to serve of the council of the society.

=== Post-retirement ===
From 2011 to 2016 Thibodeau was senior guest scientist at the Information Technology Laboratory of the National Institute of Standards and Technology (NIST). He also contributed in various roles to the Tufts University Linked Archival Metadata (LiAM) project, the National Science Foundation's Office of Advanced Cyber Infrastructure, the University of British Columbia's InterPARES Trust, the Working Group on Records Management, the Encyclopedia of Archival Science and the Italian Journal of Library, Archives and Informational Science.

== Observations ==
Material to be archived ranges from simple text documents to complex multimedia web pages. In a 2002 essay Thibodeau suggested three ways of viewing objects to be preserved. First, they are physical objects, such as flux reversals on a magnetic tape. Second, they are logical objects that can be recognized and interpreted by certain processes and software, such as a Word .doc file. Third, they are conceptual objects, such as a digital photograph as it appears on the screen. What he called an "information object" has all three properties. Thibodeau noted that its properties at each of those levels can be significantly different".

Thibodeau stressed that digital preservation cannot be separated from the questions of access. (Note: A disc holding digital content is useful only if the content can be extracted from the disc and formatted so a user can view it. If there is no longer a device capable of reading that type of disk, or if the software used to display the data has been lost, the record has been lost.) He pointed out that archives have a unique responsibility to "preserve and deliver authentic records to subsequent generations of users." Thibodeau and others such as Victoria Lemieux see graph theory and semantic technology as fundamental to the theory of archives and records management. Thibodeau distinguished "records" from other types of document.

Records are documents accumulated in the course of practical activities. As instruments and byproducts of those activities, records constitute a primary and privileged source of evidence about the activities and the actors involved in them. While records are often conceived in terms of textual documents, such as letters and reports, they can take any form. What differentiates records from documentary materials in general is not their form, but their connection to the activities in which they are made and received. If this link is broken, corrupted, or even obscured, the information in the record may be preserved, but the record itself is lost.

Noting the diversity, complexity and sheer volume of material that NARA has to manage, Thibodeau wrote:

Information in digital form poses critical challenges for the National Archives and Records Administration (NARA). While many other institutions are facing such challenges, NARA's situation is different because of the special requirements that apply to archival institutions, NARA's unique role in the Federal Government, and the scale and diversity of the Government's programs. NARA views success in facing these challenges as entailing nothing less than building the archives of the future. In sober terms, unless we succeed in surmounting these challenges there will not be a National Archives of the United States for the digital era.

== Recognition ==
Awards and honorary titles include:

- 2000: Fellow of the Society of American Archivists
- 2000: National Institutes of Health MERIT Award for applying leadership and technical skills to records management, privacy, and office automation on an NIH-wide basis in 1984
- 2003: With others: NARA, Special Achievement Award for successful development of the Access to Archival Databases resource
- 2004: Federal Computer Week, Federal 100 Award
- 2004: With others: Mid-Atlantic Regional Archives Conference, Arline Custer Memorial Prize
- 2004: With James McKan: NARA, Special Achievement Award for building and sustaining a diverse, high quality workforce
- 2008: Lifetime Achievement Award for pioneering efforts and outstanding contributions to move the National Archives to the forefront of e-government
- 2008: Emmett Leahy Award for outstanding contributions to the records and information management profession

== Publications ==
Publications include:

- Kenneth Thibodeau (1999–2000), "Rupture ou continuité: l'évaluation des archives au seuil de l'époque numérique", AAQ Archives
- Kenneth Thibodeau; Reagan Moore; Chaitan Baru (1999), "Persistent Object Preservation: Advanced Computing Infrastructure for Digital Preservation", Proceedings of the DLM Forum on Electronic Records
- Kenneth Thibodeau (2002), "Overview of Technological Approaches to Digital Preservation and Challenges in Coming Years", The State of Digital Preservation: An International Perspective, Council on Library and Information Science
- Kenneth Thibodeau; Luciana Duranti (2006), "The Concept of Record in Interactive, Experiential and Dynamic Environments: The View of InterPARES", Archival Science
- Kenneth Thibodeau (2007), "If you build it, will it fly? Criteria for Success in a Digital Repository", Journal of Digital Information
- Kenneth Thibodeau (2008), "Building a Future for Our Times: the Electronic Records Archives of the National Archives and Records Administration, U.S.", East Asian Archives
- Kenneth Thibodeau (2011), "Digital Preservation: Communicating Across Cyberspace and Time", Proceedings of the First International Digital Preservation Interoperability Framework Symposium, Association for Computing Machinery

== Sources ==
- Ambacher, Bruce I. (2003), Thirty Years of Electronic Records, Rowman & Littlefield, ISBN 978-0-8108-4769-9
- Doviak, Meredith (4 January 2011), Tech Tuesday Tribute: Ken Thibodeau, NARA
- Fitzpatrick, Kathleen (1 November 2011), Planned Obsolescence: Publishing, Technology, and the Future of the Academy, NYU Press, ISBN 978-0-8147-2897-0
- Kenneth Thibodeau, Candidate for Council, Society of American Archivists, 22 December 2011
- Kirschenbaum, Matthew G., Associate Professor of English and Associate Director (2008), Mechanisms: New Media and the Forensic Imagination, MIT Press, ISBN 978-0-262-11311-3
- Mancuso, Lara (26 April 2019), "Victoria (Vicki) Louise Lemieux (1963–)", in Duranti, Luciana; Franks, Patricia C. (eds.), Encyclopedia of Archival Writers, 1515 - 2015, Rowman & Littlefield Publishers, ISBN 978-1-5381-2580-9
- Rogers, Corinne (26 April 2019), "Kenneth Thibodeau (1945–)", in Duranti, Luciana; Franks, Patricia C. (eds.), Encyclopedia of Archival Writers, 1515 - 2015, Rowman & Littlefield Publishers, ISBN 978-1-5381-2580-9
- Zelkowitz, Marvin (5 August 2003), Advances in Computers: Information Repositories, Elsevier, ISBN 978-0-08-049351-0
