= PRONOM =

PRONOM (Public Record Office and Nôm 喃) is a web-based technical registry to support digital preservation services, developed by The National Archives of the United Kingdom. PRONOM was the first and remains, to date, the only operational public file format registry in the world, although the "Magic File" repository of the File Command has served this role in a less formal capacity for two decades. Other projects to develop technical registries like the UK Digital Curation Centre's Representation Information Registry, and the Global Digital Format Registry project at Harvard University seem to have both been discontinued.

PRONOM's origins lie in a requirement to have access to reliable technical information about the electronic records held by The National Archives. By definition, electronic records are not inherently human-readable - file formats encode information into a form which can only be processed and rendered comprehensible by very specific technological environments. The accessibility of that information is therefore highly vulnerable to technological obsolescence. Technical information about the structure of those file formats, and the software and hardware environments required to support them, is therefore a prerequisite for any digital preservation regime. PRONOM was developed to provide this function, initially as an internal resource for National Archives staff, and subsequently as public, web-based resource.

== Development ==
The first version of PRONOM was developed by The National Archives digital preservation department led by David Ryan in March 2002. PRONOM 2 was released in December 2002, and provided support for the development of multi-lingual versions of the registry. The web-enabling of PRONOM (PRONOM 3) in February 2004 represented the starting point for the development of PRONOM as a major online resource for the international digital preservation community.

PRONOM 4, released in October 2005, includes a significant reworking of the underlying data model to allow the capture of detailed technical information on file formats and support future interoperability with other planned registry systems, and the release of the DROID software for automatic file format identification.

The latest version PRONOM 5 was a relatively minor update to support improvements to DROID and was released in 2006.

The National Archives won the 2007 Digital Preservation Award sponsored by the Digital Preservation Coalition, for its work on PRONOM and DROID.

The Global Digital Format Registry project which began at Harvard in 2005 was eventually rolled along with PRONOM into the joint Unified Digital Format Registry effort. In 2012, however, the UDFR was mothballed leading to the California Digital Library eventually removing access to their node in 2016 and recommending the use of PRONOM.

In 2026, the PRONOM website was rebuilt by The National Archives and was moved to its own subdomain. The rebuild won the award for Resilience, Maintenance and Continuity at the Digital Preservation Awards 2026.

== Services ==
The core technical registry supports a number of specific services:

The PRONOM registry provides a searchable web database of technical information about file formats, the software tools required to access them, and the technical environments required to access them. Users can search for formats and software using a variety of criteria, such as format or software name and file extension. PRONOM also holds information about support periods for software products, and can also be queried on this basis. In addition to on-screen viewing, registry information can be exported in XML, CSV and printer-friendly formats. The PRONOM website allows users to submit new information for inclusion in PRONOM.

=== The PRONOM Persistent Unique Identifier (PUID) scheme ===
The PRONOM Persistent Unique Identifier (PUID) is an extensible scheme of persistent, unique and unambiguous identifiers for records in the PRONOM registry. Such identifiers are fundamental to the exchange and management of digital objects, by allowing human or automated user agents to unambiguously identify, and share that identification of, the representation information required to support access to an object. This is a virtue both of the inherent uniqueness of the identifier, and of its binding to a definitive description of the representation information in a registry such as PRONOM.

At present, the PUID scheme is limited to one particular class of representation information: the format in which a digital object is encoded. Formats were considered a particular priority for such a scheme, as no existing, universally applicable system provides for this. Unix magic numbers and Macintosh data forks do provide some of this functionality, but the same is not true within MS-DOS or Windows environments. The three-character file extension is neither standardised nor unique, and is interpreted differently by different environments. Equally, the IANA MIME-type scheme does not provide sufficient granularity or coverage to satisfy the requirements for unique identifiers. The PUID scheme has been developed for the single purpose of providing such identifiers.

The scheme has been adopted as the recommended encoding scheme for describing file formats in the latest version of the UK e-Government Metadata Standard. The scheme is designed to be extensible, and may be expanded in future to include other classes of representation information in PRONOM, such as compression methods, character encoding schemes, and operating systems.

PUIDs can be expressed as Uniform Resource Identifiers using the info:pronom/ namespace, details of which are available from the info URI registry. Neither the PUID scheme, nor its expression as an info URI, supports any inherent dereferencing mechanism, i.e. a PUID does not resolve to a Uniform Resource Locator. However, The National Archives is planning to develop a range of services to expose PRONOM registry content, including a resolution service for PUIDs.

=== DROID ===
DROID (Digital Record Object Identification) is a software tool developed by The National Archives to perform automated batch identification of file formats. It is one of a planned series of tools utilising PRONOM to provide specific digital preservation services. DROID uses internal (byte sequence) and external (file extension) signatures to identify and report the specific file format versions of digital files. These signatures are stored in an XML signature file, generated from information recorded in the PRONOM technical registry. New and updated signatures are regularly added to PRONOM, and DROID can be configured to automatically download updated signature files from the PRONOM website via web services.

DROID allows files and folders to be selected from a file system for identification. After the identification process had been run, the results can be output in XML, CSV or printer-friendly formats.

DROID is a platform-independent Java tool. It includes a documented, public API, and can be invoked from both GUI and command line interfaces.

=== Future services ===
Proposed future services include format risk assessments and preservation planning, and the automated generation of migration pathways for converting between formats.

== See also ==
- Digital curation
- Digital preservation
- File format
- File (command)
