= Seamus Ross =

American-born Canadian digital humanities and curation academic

Seamus Ross (born November 12, 1957) is a digital humanities and digital curation academic and researcher based in Canada.

He is the son of James Francis Ross, a philosopher, and Kathleen Fallon Ross, a nurse. After graduating from the William Penn Charter School, he earned his A.B. (1979) from Vassar College (United States), his M.A. (1982) from the University of Pennsylvania (USA), and his D.Phil. (1992) from the University of Oxford (UK).

Seamus Ross is professor at the iSchool at the University of Toronto, also known as the Faculty of Information and from 2009 through 2015 he served as the school's dean. During 2016, he was visiting professor at the School of Information Sciences and Technology, Athens University of Economics and Business (Athens, GR), and interim director of the McLuhan Centre for Culture and Technology at the University of Toronto. Before joining Toronto, he was professor of humanities informatics and digital curation and founding director of HATII (Humanities Advanced Technology and Information Institute) (1997–2009) at the University of Glasgow. He was one of the founders of and served as associate director of the Digital Curation Centre (2004–9) in the UK, and was principal director of ERPANET and Digital Preservation Europe (DPE) and a co-principal investigator such projects as the DELOS Digital Libraries Network of Excellence, Planets and the Digicult Forum. From the beginning of 1990 through 1996, Ross was assistant secretary (information technology) at the British Academy in London.

Ross's scholarly research has focused on digital humanities, digital preservation, digital curation, digitisation, digital repositories, emulation, digital archaeology, semantic extraction and genre classification, and cultural heritage informatics. See for instance his study of digital archaeology, his examination of digital preservation and archival science, and his introduction to digital preservation, Changing Trains at Wigan. He promotes a diversity in ways of making scholarship available to broader audiences and was instrumental in the creation of the Digiman Series through Digital Preservation Europe, Digital Preservation and Nuclear Disaster: An Animation,

== Honours ==
In March 2016, Ross was elected a Corresponding Fellow of the Royal Society of Edinburgh, Scotland's national academy of science and letters.

== Select bibliography ==
- Y. Kim and S.Ross, ‘The Naming of Cats: Automated Genre Classification’, The International Journal of Digital Curation Vol 2 No 1, 2007, ISSN 1746-8256
- A McHugh, S Ross, R Ruusaleep & H Hofman, 'The Digital Repository Audit Method Based on Risk Assessment (DRAMBORA)’. 2007. ISBN 978-1-906242-00-8 (256 pages)
- S Ross, 2006, ‘Approaching Digital Preservation Holistically’, in A Tough and M Moss (eds.), Information Management and Preservation, (Oxford: Chandos Press)
- L Candela, D Castelli, Y Ioannidis, G Koutrika, P Pagano, S Ross, H-J Schek, H Schuldt, 2006, The Digital Library Manifesto, DELOS Network of Excellence in Digital Libraries, (ISBN 2-912335-24-8)
- Y Kim and S Ross, Genre Classification in Automated Ingest and Appraisal Metadata, J. Gonzalo et al. (eds.): ECDL 2006, LNCS 4172, 63–74, 2006.
- S Ross and A McHugh, 2006, ‘The Role of Evidence in Establishing Trust in Repositories’, D-Lib Magazine, July/August, v.12, n7/8
- S Ross and M Hedstrom, 2005, ‘Preservation Research and Sustainable Digital Libraries’, International Journal of Digital Libraries, Vol 5.4, 317-325. Digital Object Identifier (DOI) 10.1007/s00799-004-0099-3, ISSN 1432-5012.
- C Rusbridge, P Burnhill, S Ross, P Buneman, D Giaretta, L Lyon, M Atkinson, 2005, ‘The Digital Curation Centre: A Vision for Digital Curation’, In Proceedings IEEE’s Mass Storage and Systems Technology Committee Conference on From Local to Global: Data Interoperability—Challenges and Technologies.
- S Ross, M Donnelly, M Dobreva, D Abbott, A McHugh and A Rusbridge, 2005, Core Technologies for the Cultural and Scientific Heritage Sector, DigiCULT Technology Watch Report 3, European Commission, ISBN 92-894-5277-3, 296 pages.
- S Ross, 2004, ‘The Role of ERPANET in Supporting Digital Curation and Preservation in Europe’, DLIB (July/August) vol 10.7/8, , ISSN 1082-9873.
- S Ross, 2004, ‘Reflections on the Impact of the Lund Principles on European Approaches to Digitisation’ in Strategies for a European Area of Digital Cultural Resources: Towards a Continuum of Digital Heritage, (Den Haag), 88-98.
- S Ross, M Greenan, and P McKinney, 2004, ‘Digital Preservation Strategies: The Initial Outcomes of the ERPANET Case Studies’ in the Preservation of Electronic Records: New Knowledge and Decision-making, (Ottawa: Canadian Conservation Institute), 99-114.
- J Esanu, J Davidson, S Ross, and W Anderson, 2004, ‘Selection, Appraisal, and Retention of Digital Scientific Data: Highlights of an ERPANET/CODATA Workshop’, Data Science Journal, 3, 30 December 2004
- S. Ross, 2004. ‘ERPANET, A European Platform for Enabling Digital Preservation,’ Vine: The Journal of Information and Knowledge Management, 34.2 (issue 135), 77-83.
- S Ross, M Donnelly, & M Dobreva, 2004, New Technologies for the Cultural and Scientific Heritage Sector, DigiCULT Technology Watch Report 2, European Commission, ISBN 92-894-5276-5. 214 pages.
- S Ross and M Hedstrom 2003, Invest to Save: Report and Recommendations of the NSF-DELOS Working Group on Digital Archiving and Preservation,
- S Ross 2003, Digital Library Development Review, National Library of New Zealand, (Wellington), ISBN 0-477-02797-0. , 88 pages.
- S Ross, 2003, ‘Position Paper: Towards a Semantic Web for Heritage Resources’, Towards a Semantic Web for Heritage Resources, Thematic Issue 3, 7-11. ISBN 3-902448-00-8.
- S Ross, M Donnelly, & M Dobreva, 2003, New Technologies for the Cultural and Scientific Heritage Sector, DigiCULT Technology Watch Report 1, European Commission, ISBN 92-894-5275-7, 194 pages.
- S Ross 2002, ‘Cyberculture, cultural asset management and ethnohistory’, Archivi & Computer, XII.1, 43-60.

Academic offices
Preceded by Jens-Erik Mai (Acting)	Dean of University of Toronto Faculty of Information; 2009 – 2015	Succeeded by Wendy Duff
