= GDFR =

GDFR may refer to:

- Global Digital Format Registry, in digital preservation
- "G.D.F.R.", a 2014 song by Flo Rida
