= RSLP =

The initials RSLP may refer to:

- Répondre s'il lui plaît, an archaic variant of the better known French phrase, RSVP
- Research Support Libraries Programme, a UK government funding programme 1999-2002
- Revolutionary Socialist Labor Party, an American Socialist party 1881-1883
