= Victoria Lemieux =

Canadian records manager

Victoria Louise Lemieux
- Born: 27 March 1963 (age 63); Toronto, Ontario, Canada
- Occupations: Records manager Professor of Archival Science
- Known for: Using blockchain technology to reduce risk

Victoria Louise Lemieux (born 27 March 1963) is a Canadian specialist in records management and Professor of Archival Studies at the University of British Columbia (UBC). She is known for her research into financial information management, risk mitigation including using blockchain technology in risk reduction.

== Early years and education ==
Victoria Louise Lemieux (née Bryans) was born in Toronto in 1963. She obtained a master's degree in Archival Studies from the University of British Columbia around 1985, and began a career as a records and information management professional. In 2002 she obtained a doctorate from University College London with a thesis that examined information-related causes of the Jamaican Financial Crisis of 1996–1997. She became a Certified Information Systems Security Professional (CISSP) in 2005.

== Career ==
=== City of Edmonton ===
Lemieux was director of information services for the City of Edmonton, where she improved records management in the City Clerk's Office. She was promoted to Director of Corporate Records and Information Services, where she was responsible for all the city's records.

=== University of the West Indies ===
In September 1993 Lemieux became the campus records manager at the University of the West Indies (UWI). In 1997 she was promoted to University Archivist at the UWI, and was responsible for modernizing the registry system on three campuses. She also expanded the University's records management certificate program to train public sector workers throughout the Caribbean region. She provided consulting on improving efficiency and accountability of records management in several English-speaking Caribbean countries. She left UWI in July 2001.

=== World Bank ===
Lemieux was a consultant at the World Bank from July 2001 to September 2002. She audited the human resources and payroll systems of governments in Uttar Pradesh (India), Tanzania, Burkina Faso and Chile. She returned to the World Bank as a senior public sector specialist from July 2014 to June 2016, on leave from the University of British Columbia. She worked on supporting economic and social development through transparency and information management, and was a leader of several big data analytics projects. Lemieux led the imProvenance Group funded by the World Bank. She advised the World Bank, associated international development agencies and the bank's client developing countries on transparency and information management.

=== Credit Suisse ===
After completing her doctorate at UCL in 2002 Lemieux joined the global investment bank Credit Suisse. She was vice president, IT risk management. In 2007 she was responsible for the information technology risk and security components of a major project to outsource the bank's network infrastructure. In this project she applied her pioneering theory of risk-based records management.

=== Consultant ===
In 2008 Lemieux founded CIFER, the Centre for the Investigation of Financial Electronic Records. After the 2008 financial crisis, she worked with the Office of Financial Research of the United States Department of the Treasury to introduce records management concepts to financial regulators and to promote transparency in the global financial system. She was Canadian representative to the TC68 Technical Committee on Financial Services of the International Organization for Standardization (ISO). She has also served as a consultant to the United Nations and the Commonwealth Secretariat.

=== University of British Columbia ===
From July 2012 to July 2014 Lemieux was director of the Media & Graphics Interdisciplinary Centre (MAGIC) at the University of British Columbia (UBC), where she established the Digital Salon for use by the Digital Humanities. In April 2014 she became an Associate Professor in Archival Science at the University of British Columbia (UBC). She contributed to design of courses on Information Technology Security, Information Assurance and Risk Management; Financial Records; and Information Visualization and Visual Analytics.

After returning from two years leave at the World Bank, in 2016 Lemieux founded a cross-discipline research cluster into blockchain technology, Blockchain@UBC. In 2019 she was awarded $1,600,000 by Canada's Natural Sciences and Engineering Research Council (NSERC) for a five-year project to train up to 139 students at the masters and PhD levels in different aspects of blockchain and distributed ledger technology. Fifteen industry partners, including Boehringer Ingelheim and Mitacs, also provided support. The program was to start in January 2020 and would cover the areas of health and wellness, clean energy, regulatory technology and issues for indigenous residents.

== Research and innovation ==
Lemieux views archival science as an academic discipline that is relevant to other disciplines, as opposed to viewing it as a professional field. She embraces tools and approaches from ontology, visual analytics, graph theory, information systems and philosophy to describe the internal structure of archive records, their provenance and how they represent networks. Lemieux and others such as Kenneth Thibodeau see graph theory and semantic technology as fundamental to the theory of archives and records management.

In 2010 Lemieux studied literature on records and information risk, looking into aspects such as the types of risk discussed most often, approaches to the subject and evolution of views over time. She reviewed several hundred articles on risk associated with archives and records. Topics included types of risk to records, risks caused by records, risks if the profession does not adapt to new record formats, risks in the way in which archival functions are performed and techniques for mitigating risk. Lemieux has developed a tool to assess organizational and human behavioural risk when implementing EDRM systems.

As of 2020 she was investigating availability of trustworthy records, particularly financial records. She was interested in how the risks to records availability affect public accountability and transparency, financial stability and human rights. She was particularly interested in blockchain record keeping systems. She is a member of the International Organization for Standardization (ISO) Technical Committee 307 on Blockchains and Distributed Ledger Technology.

== Recognition ==
Awards include:

- 2001 W. Kaye Lamb Best Paper Award
- 2009 Peter Wall Institute for Advanced Studies Early Career Scholar Award
- 2011 Emerald Literati Best Paper Award
- 2015 Emmett Leahy Award for outstanding contributions to the records profession
- 2015 World Bank Big Data Innovation Award

== Publications ==
- Victoria L. Lemieux; David Leonard (1992), Tracing Your Ancestors in Alberta (a guide to sources of genealogical interest in Alberta's archives and research centres), Lemieux-Leonard Research Associates, ISBN 096959190X
- Victoria L. Lemieux (1998), "Applying mintzberg's theories on organizational configuration to archival appraisal", Archivaria, 46: 32–85
- Sam Agere; P. C. Mazikana; Victoria L. Lemieux (1999), Better Information Practices: Improving Records and Information Management in the Public Service, Commonwealth Secretariat, ISBN 978-0-85092-582-1
- Victoria L. Lemieux (2001), "Let the Ghosts Speak: An Empirical Exploration of the" Nature" of the Record", Archivaria, 51: 81–111
- David W. Leonard; Victoria L. Lemieux (2003), The Lure of the Peace River Country: A Fostered Dream, Detselig Enterprises, ISBN 978-1-55059-243-6
- Victoria L. Lemieux (2004), Managing risks for records and information, ARMA International, ISBN 1931786186
- Victoria L. Lemieux; B Gormly; L Rowledge (2014), "Meeting Big Data challenges with visual analytics: The role of records management", Records Management Journal, 24 (2): 122–141, doi:10.1108/RMJ-01-2014-0009
- Victoria L. Lemieux; Lynn Coleman, eds. (2011), Managing Records in Global Financial Markets: Ensuring Compliance and Mitigating Risk (Principles and Practice in Records Management and Archives), Facet, ISBN 978-1856046633
- Victoria Lemieux, ed. (20 October 2012), Financial Analysis and Risk Management: Data Governance, Analytics and Life Cycle Management, Springer Science & Business Media, ISBN 978-3-642-32232-7
- Victoria L. Lemieux, ed. (11 August 2016), Building Trust in Information: Perspectives on the Frontiers of Provenance, Springer, ISBN 978-3-319-40226-0
- Victoria L. Lemieux; Stephanie E. Trapnell (29 June 2016), Public Access to Information for Development: A Guide to the Effective Implementation of Right to Information Laws, World Bank Publications, ISBN 978-1-4648-0880-7
- Victoria L. Lemieux (2016), "Trusting records: is Blockchain technology the answer?", Records Management Journal
- MD Flood; Victoria L. Lemieux; M Varga; BLW Wong (2016), "The application of visual analytics to financial stability monitoring", Journal of Financial Stability (27): 180–197
- Victoria L. Lemieux (2017), "A typology of blockchain recordkeeping solutions and some reflections on their implications for the future of archival preservation", 2017 IEEE International Conference on Big Data (Big Data), pp. 2271–2278
- Victoria L. Lemieux (2017), "Blockchain and distributed ledgers as trusted recordkeeping systems", Future Technologies Conference (FTC) 2017
- Victoria L. Lemieux (2017), "Evaluating the use of blockchain in land transactions: An archival science perspective", European Property Law Journal, 6 (3): 392–440, doi:10.1515/eplj-2017-0019, S2CID 168831936
- Victoria Lemieux; Chen Feng (26 January 2021), Building Decentralized Trust: Multidisciplinary Perspectives on the Design of Blockchains and Distributed Ledgers, Springer International Publishing, ISBN 978-3-030-54413-3

== Sources ==
- Dr Victoria Lemieux, RDA Research Data Alliance
- Duranti, Luciana (2015), Announcement of the 2015 Emmett Leahy Award to Victori Lemieux, Emmett Leahy Award
- Duranti, Luciana; Franks, Patricia C. (17 June 2015), Encyclopedia of Archival Science, Rowman & Littlefield Publishers, ISBN 978-0-8108-8811-1
- Duranti, Luciana; Franks, Patricia C. (26 April 2019), Encyclopedia of Archival Writers, 1515 - 2015, Rowman & Littlefield Publishers, ISBN 978-1-5381-2580-9
- "Lemieux, Victoria L., 1963-", VIAF
- Lemieux, Victoria, ed. (20 October 2012), Financial Analysis and Risk Management: Data Governance, Analytics and Life Cycle Management, Springer Science & Business Media, ISBN 978-3-642-32232-7
- Mancuso, Lara (26 April 2019), "Victoria (Vicki) Louise Lemieux (1963–)", in Duranti, Luciana; Franks, Patricia C. (eds.), Encyclopedia of Archival Writers, 1515 - 2015, Rowman & Littlefield Publishers, ISBN 978-1-5381-2580-9
- Victoria L Lemieux, OGP Open Government Partnership
- Victoria L. Lemieux, World Bank, 5 May 2016
