= Weapon Masters =

Television series

- Starring: Chad Houseknecht; Mike Loades
- No. of seasons: 1
- No. of episodes: 10

Original release
- Network: Discovery Channel

Weapon Masters is a television show that was premiered on the Discovery Channel on December 31, 2007, and on the Military Channel.

The hosts, Chad Houseknecht and Mike Loades, a weapons historian, choose a different historical weapon each week. While Loades explores its history — often traveling to the country from which it came to interview modern practitioners — Houseknecht capers about, gibbering and gurning, while attempting to improve on it using modern technology (for example, a pneumatic device was added to a blowgun in one episode). At the end of each episode a challenge test of the new version is held.

== Episodes ==
- Source:
  - Ep.1 (Roman Scorpion)
  - Ep.2 (Greek Fire)
  - Ep.3 (Dueling Pistols)
  - Ep.4 (Atlatl)
  - Ep.5 (Katana)
  - Ep.6 (Repeating Crossbow)
  - Ep.7 (Rockets)
  - Ep.8 (Chakram)
  - Ep.9 (Chariot Bow)
  - Ep.10 (Blowpipe)
