= Jane Winters =

Jane Frances Winters FRHistS is Professor of digital humanities and director of the Digital Humanities Research Hub (DHRH) at the School of Advanced Study, University of London.

== Life and career ==
Jane Winters was born in 1970. She trained as a medieval historian and completed her PhD at King's College London in 1999. Her doctoral thesis, The Forest Eyre, 1154-1368, was directed by David Carpenter.

Winters is a Fellow and Council Member of the Royal Historical Society. She is a member of the Academic Steering and Advocacy Committee of the Open Library of Humanities. She is a member of the UK UNESCO Memory of the World Committee. In December 2023 she was elected as the sixth Chair of the Digital Preservation Coalition.

== Selected publications ==
- 'Negotiating the archives of UK web space', The Historical Web and Digital Humanities: the Case of National Web Domains, ed. Niels Brügger and Ditte Laursen (London: Routledge, 2019)
- ‘Web archives and (digital) history: a troubled past and a promising future?’, in The SAGE Handbook of Web History, ed. Niels Brügger and Ian Milligan (SAGE Publications Ltd., 2019)
- 'Digital history’, in Debating New Approaches to History, ed. Marek Tamm and Peter Burke (London: Bloomsbury Publishing, 2018)
- ‘What does an author want from a publisher?’, Learned Publishing, 31 (4) (September 2018), pp. 318-22
- Tackling complexity in humanities big data: from parliamentary proceedings to the archived web, in Big and Rich Data in English Corpus Linguistics: Methods and Variations, ed. Turo Hiltunen, Joe McVeigh and Tanja Säily (Helsinki: Varieng, 2017)
- 'Breaking in to the mainstream: demonstrating the value of internet (and web) histories', Internet Histories. Digital Technology, Culture and Society, Volume 1, 2017, Issue 1-2
- ‘Will history survive the digital age?’, BBC History Magazine (March 2017), pp. 39-43
- The Creighton century, 1907-2007. Institute of Historical Research, London, 2009. ISBN 9781905165339 (ed. with David Bates and Jennifer Wallis)
- Peer review and evaluation of digital resources for the arts and humanities. London, 2006. (co-authored report)
- Teachers of history in the universities of the UK and the Republic of Ireland (published annually) (joint compiler)
- Historical research for higher degrees in the UK and the Republic of Ireland (published annually) (joint compiler)
- "The British history online digital library: A model for sustainability?", Bulletin, 176 (2010), 95–106. (with Jonathan Blaney)

== See also ==
- British History Online
