= Electronic Records Archives =

Logo

The Electronic Records Archives (ERA) is a program of the United States National Archives and Records Administration (NARA) to preserve electronic records as part of the U.S. government's broader records management process. The program began in 1998 and started to accept records in 2008. As of 2017, NARA was working to overhaul the system in an effort called "ERA 2.0."

== History ==
Efforts by U.S. government archivists to preserve electronic records date to the 1960s but the task took on heightened importance toward the end of the 20th century, as the volume and variety of government-produced digital records expanded. According to Kenneth Thibodeau when he was the ERA program's director, the idea of an initiative to better manage electronic records took shape in the 1990s as NARA officials looked ahead to the expected end of the Bill Clinton administration in January 2001, when the White House would hand over staff email messages for preservation: "We estimated the transfer of something in the realm of forty million e-mail messages. No system in the agency could handle that volume. Even if we expanded existing systems a hundredfold, we still could not handle the simple workload of copying those files."

In 1998, NARA launched the ERA program, and an office was established in 2000. The agency released a draft request for proposals in August 2003, followed by a final version in 2004. A $308 million, six-year contract to build the system was awarded to Lockheed Martin in September 2005.

In 2008, the ERA system began accepting records from four pilot agencies, and in January 2009 it began to take in George W. Bush administration records. Development of the system ended in 2011 and within a few years it was storing hundreds of terabytes of electronic records.

== Functions ==
NARA has described ERA as a "system of systems" with four primary functions: accepting electronic records from government bodies, assigning metadata to document those records, preserving those records, and allowing access to those records. This adapts the traditional work of archival processing to digital records, a form of digital curation.

As of 2012, federal agencies also used ERA to submit proposed record retention schedules, and NARA used the system to review and either approve or reject those schedules. Schedules are used to determine how long records should be retained by the U.S. government before they are destroyed, with only some records deemed worthy of permanent preservation. Only a small fraction of government records, 1% to 3%, are preserved in perpetuity by NARA.

== ERA 2.0 ==
In 2012, NARA decided the ERA system required "extensive modernization and refactoring," which would come in a project called ERA 2.0. Among other things, the project would incorporate cloud computing technology and an Agile software approach. The new system will include a Digital Processing Environment to accept and process digital materials, and a Digital Object Repository to store materials. A pilot program began in 2015 and the production release was scheduled for 2018.
