= Everett O. Alldredge =

American archivist and records manager

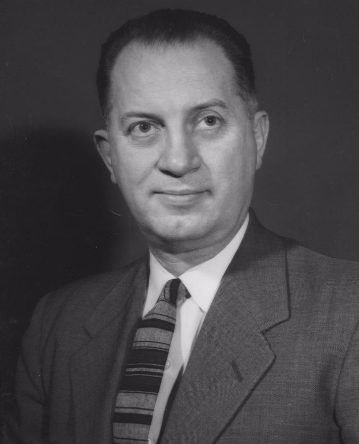
- Born: Everett Owen Alldredge; September 22, 1912; Mount Vernon, Indiana
- Died: September 9, 1973 (aged 60); Washington, D.C.
- Occupations: Assistant Archivist for Records Management, NARA

Everett Owen Alldredge (September 22, 1912 – September 9, 1973) was an American archivist and records manager, and a leader in the American archival community.

Everett O. Alldredge was born and raised in Mount Vernon, Indiana, and completed his undergraduate studies in history at DePauw University. He joined the staff of the National Archives in 1940, and spent most of his 31-year career involved in records management. From 1959 to 1971 he served as Assistant Archivist for Records Management. He was also an active member of the archival profession, serving as president of the Society of American Archivists from 1963 to 1964. Alldredge received the Emmett Leahy Award in 1969.

Alldredge died of cancer two years after his retirement, on September 9, 1973.
