= British Library Preservation Advisory Centre =

Archival association

- Formation: 1984; 42 years ago
- Dissolved: 31 March 2014; 12 years ago
- Location(s): 96 Euston Road London, NW1 2DB
- Coordinates: 51°31′46″N 0°07′37″W
- Parent organisation: British Library
- Formerly called: National Preservation Office

The British Library Preservation Advisory Centre, formerly the National Preservation Office, was a British organisation for the development and awareness of preservation management within libraries and archives in the UK and Ireland. The centre closed in 2014.

== Purpose and activities ==
In April 1984, the British Library Board established the National Preservation Office following the publication of the Ratcliffe Report. During its existence it raised public awareness of preservation issues in libraries and served as a nexus for developing and promoting improved preservation management of library and archive materials in the UK and Ireland. The Centre aimed to create a strategic policy for preserving current library collections, and addressed issues arising as digital collections evolved.

Its work was focused on practical results:

- To assist cultural heritage agencies and organizations develop strategies for the preservation of cultural heritage assets in museums, libraries and archives, including the further development of the "Preservation Assessment Survey" (PAS) and training in the use of the PAS tools
- To provide print and web-based information services for individuals and organizations, especially for collections throughout the United Kingdom and Ireland.
- To provide training in preservation management for individuals and organizations including relevant training in the following areas: introduction to preservation management; disaster management; environmental control and monitoring.

The Centre published an annual digest and report.

== International influence ==
The need for national entities like the Centre had been documented in surveys conducted by the International Federation of Library Associations and Institutions (IFLA) Section on Preservation & Conservation and by the Ligue Internationale des Bibliothèques Européennes de Recherches. Other than the United Kingdom, at least seven other countries have set up a similar entity, including Canada and New Zealand.

== Merger and closure ==
In 2009 the National Preservation Office merged with the British Library Department of Collection Care to form the British Library Preservation Advisory Centre. Following the Centre's closure on 31 March 2014, all publications and resources were transferred to the British Library Collection Care webpages.

== See also ==
- Digital Preservation Coalition
- Consortium of Research Libraries in the British Isles
- Ronald Milne
- National Digital Information Infrastructure and Preservation Program of the Library of Congress (NDIIPP)
