= Preservation and Long-term Access through Networked Services =

Digital preservation project

The Preservation and Long-term Access through Networked Services (PLANETS) project addressed core digital preservation challenges. The primary goal for Planets was to build practical services and tools to help ensure long-term access to digital cultural and scientific assets. The outputs of this European Sixth Framework Programme are, since 2010, sustained by the follow-on organisation, the Open Planets Foundation.

Amongst its higher profile outputs, in 2010, PLANETS deposited a Time Capsule in the vaults of Swiss Fort Knox containing digital data along with instructions on how to retrieve and decode it.

In 2012, PLANETS was awarded the Digital Preservation Coalition's award for Research and Innovation.

== See also ==
- Digital Preservation Award
- Digital preservation
- Data preservation
- Preservation metadata
