= Peter Sommer (director) =

British archaeologist and documentary filmmaker

Peter Sommer is a British archaeologist, television director and producer, and tour operator.

The documentaries he has worked on include Tales from the Green Valley, a 12 part series about life on a farm in the year 1620 shown on BBC2 in 2005, Weapons That Made Britain shown on Channel 4, Britain's Finest Castles and Britain's Finest Ancient Monuments (Channel Five), Millennium: A thousand years of history (BBC/CNN), Commanding Heights: the Battle for the World Economy (PBS/BBC) and In the Footsteps of Alexander the Great (BBC/PBS).

Sommer received a first-class degree in Ancient History and Archaeology following by an MPhil. from Birmingham University, before embarking on a PhD. at University College London.

In 1994, Sommer walked 2,000 miles across Turkey, from Troy to the site of the battle of Issus, retracing the route of Alexander the Great. For this journey he received The Explorers Club of America Young Expeditioners’ award.

A freelance writer, who has written on topics including travel, archaeology, and documentary making, Sommer also heads a British tour operator, Peter Sommer Travels, which specialises in expert-led cultural and archaeological tours. Sommer lives in Monmouthshire in Wales.

== Awards and recognition ==
Sommer was awarded the Learning on Screen Award in 2006 by the British Universities Film & Video Council, for the BBC TV series Tales from the Green Valley. The travel company he founded, Peter Sommer Travels, won the Tour Operator of the Year Gold Award in 2016, 2018 and 2023 and the Silver Award in 2017, 2019, 2020 and 2024, given by AITO, The (Association of Independent Tour Operators).
