= Humanities Advanced Technology and Information Institute =

The Humanities Advanced Technology and Information Institute (HATII) was a research and teaching institute at the University of Glasgow in Scotland. It was established in 1997 with Professor Seamus Ross as Founding Director until 2009. HATII led research in archival and library science and in information/knowledge management. Research strengths were in the areas of humanities computing, digitisation, digital curation and preservation, and archives and records management.

== Research initiatives ==
HATII partner in research initiatives AHDS Performing Arts, 3D-COFORM (Tools and Expertise for 3D Collection Formation), SHAMAN (Sustaining Heritage Access through Multivalent ArchiviNg), DigiCULT, CASPAR (Cultural, Artistic and Scientific knowledge Preservation, for Access and Retrieval), DELOS Digital Library Network of Excellence Preservation Cluster, Planets (Preservation and Long-term Access to our Cultural and Scientific Heritage), Primarily History, Mapping the Practice and Profession of Sculpture in Britain and Ireland 1851-1951 and TheGlasgowStory. Its Electronic Research Preservation and Access NETwork (ERPANET) had a broad impact on developing the preservation research community ethos in Europe. It was followed by Digital Preservation Europe|DigitalPreservationEurope (DPE) which produced research outputs DRAMBORA and PLATTER, experimented with animation as a mechanism for dissemination of scholarship. HATII was a founding partner of the UK's Digital Curation Centre in 2004.

== Degree programs ==
Between 1997 and when it launched its first degree programs in the early 2000s, HATII taught in multimedia (from 1997), digitisation (from 1998), and cyberspace studies (from 2000). HATII founded the UK's first postgraduate programme in digital preservation/curation as an MSc Information Management and Preservation in 2001. In 2003, it launched a joint honours MA in Arts and Media Informatics which eventually became a single honours MA in Digital Media and Information Studies. Both the undergraduate MA and the MSc were accredited CILIP (Chartered Institute of Library and Information Professionals) and the MSc accredited by the UK Archives and Records Association. In 2010 HATII established an MSc programme in Museum Studies.

== Information Studies ==
After twenty years HATII became, in September 2017, Information Studies. Lorna Hughes was appointed the first head of Information Studies in 2016.
