= Anne R. Kenney =

American librarian and archivist (1950–2022)

- Born: 1950
- Died: February 5, 2022 (aged 72)
- Education: University of Missouri (MLIS 1979); University of Missouri-St. Louis (MA 1975); Duke University (BA 1972)
- Occupations: Librarian, Archivist
- Employer: Cornell University Library

Anne R. Kenney (1950 – February 5, 2022) was an American librarian and archivist known for her work in digital preservation.

== Education ==
After receiving her bachelor's degree from Duke University (cum laude), Kenney earned a master's degree in history (with distinction) from the University of Missouri-St. Louis and a master's degree in library science from the University of Missouri.

== Professional work ==
Kenney worked at Cornell University Library from 1987. She served as an associate director for the Department of Preservation and Conservation; associate university librarian for instruction, research and information services; interim university library and, beginning in April 2008, university librarian. She retired in 2017.

Upon arriving at Cornell, Kenney became involved in the Brittle Books Program, converting books to microfilm. She became intrigued by the promise of scanners and researched digital imaging technology. She identified a difficult font (Bodoni italics) and successfully captured it; the methods developed at Cornell formed the basis of the JSTOR and Google Books projects.

Kenney later became interested in problems of digital preservation and began researching file migration and long-term storage. Her professional interests included the preservation of digital-first serials, the new norm for scholarly publication.

== Personal life and death ==
Kenney died on February 5, 2022, at the age of 72.

== Organizations ==
She served on the Social Science Research Council's Committee on Libraries and Archives of Cuba, and the Advisory Committee of Portico. Past service includes work as a commissioner of the National Historical Publications and Records Commission, the National Science Foundation/European Working Group on a Digital Preservation Research Agenda, the Clinton/Gore Transition Team, and Senate subcommittee testimony. She was a fellow and past president of the Society of American Archivists.

== Awards ==
Kenney's scholarly and professional publications have earned a number of awards, including the

- Missouri Conference on History's Distinguished Book Award (1985)
- Phi Alpha Theta's Best First Book Award (1986)
- Yahoo en español's Internet y computadoras award (2002)
- Society of American Archivists' Preservation Publication Award (1995 and 2004)
- Society of American Archivists' Waldo Gifford Leland Award (1997 and 2000)
- American Library Association’s LITA/Library Hi Tech Award (2001)
- American Library Association's Hugh C. Atkinson Memorial Award (2014).

== Publications ==
Kenney published numerous articles and reports and co-authored three award-winning books:

- Moving Theory into Practice: Digital Imaging for Libraries and Archives (Research Libraries Group, 2000) with Oya Y. Rieger
- Digital Imaging for Libraries and Archives (Cornell University Library, 1996) with Stephen Chapman
- Women’s Suffrage, Social Politics, and the French Third Republic (Princeton University Press, 1984) with Steven C. Hause.

She collaborated with Chapman and Nancy McGovern to produce award-winning web-based tutorials. She served as co-editor of RLG DigiNews from 1997–2006.
