= Nancy McGovern =

Dr. Nancy Y. McGovern
- Known for: 72nd President of the Society of American Archivists, Digital preservation, data curation, Digital Preservation Management workshops, Radical Collaboration.
- Awards: Emmett Leahy Award 2023. Awarded for Outstanding Contributions and Accomplishments that Have a Major Impact on the Records and Information Management.

Academic background
- Education: University College London, Northeastern University, Saint Anselm College
- Thesis: Technology Responsiveness for Digital Preservation: A Model (2009)

Academic work
- Discipline: digital preservation, data curation archivist
- Institutions: Massachusetts Institute of Technology, University of Michigan, Cornell University, Blinken Open Society Archives, National Archives of the United States of America

Dr. Nancy Y. McGovern is a digital preservation pioneer. She is the 2023 recipient of the Emmet Leahy Award for Outstanding Contributions to the Information and Records Management professions. Dr. McGovern has devoted her career to developing digital records and preservation programs for a series of prominent institutions, translating those experiences into widely-used curriculum and continuing education programs to help organizations and individuals build their capacity to develop sustainable programs to preserve digital content, defining and promulgating standards-based good practice for digital archives and preservation, and engaging in research-based practice to fill gaps in good practice for digital archives and the preservation of them. She has focused on building an international community of practice for digital archives and preservation most recently with the development and promulgation of the Radical Collaboration model for working within and across domains.

== Career ==
After graduation from St. Anselm College in Manchester, New Hampshire, and Northeastern University in Boston, Nancy McGovern worked for the Center for Electronic Records at the National Archives and Records Administration and the Open Society Archives (Budapest, Hungary). Considered to be a pioneer of digital preservation, McGovern has focused on digital preservation and practice since 1986, when she became senior staff of the Center for Electronic Records at the U.S. National Archives and Records Administration. Prior to her tenure at MIT, McGovern worked as a research assistant professor and digital preservation officer at the Inter-university Consortium for Political and Social Research (ICPSR) and Director of Research and Assessment Services and digital preservation officer at Cornell University. She was the first digital preservation officer for Cornell University Library and for the Inter-University Consortium for Political and Social Research (ICPSR), and the first director of digital preservation at the Massachusetts institute of Technology (MIT) Libraries. She was awarded her Ph.D. at University College London in 2009, one of the first to focus on digital preservation with a thesis on technology responsiveness.

Dr. McGovern co-founded the Electronic Records Section of the Society of American Archivists (SAA) in 1993, co-founded and chaired the SAA Research Forum from 2007 to 2022, and recently served as the Society’s president. In 2009 she was named a Digital Preservation Pioneer by the National Digital Information Infrastructure Preservation Program (NDIIPP) and continues to be engaged with its successor, the National Digital Stewardship Alliance (NDSA). Since 2008, she has collaborated with community leaders in South Africa to develop and implement good practice for digital curation and preservation. At the 2015 International Conference on Digital Preservation (iPres), she convened the first community discussion on digital preservation storage and has since served on the working group that developed and maintains the Preservation Storage Criteria, a de facto community standard. For the International Council on Archives (ICA), she co-developed an online course “Managing Digital Archives” that has worldwide impact. Nancy McGovern was the 72nd president of the Society of American Archivists (2016-2017). She presented her SAA Presidential Address, "Archives, History, and Technology: Prologue and Possibilities for SAA and the Archival Community" at the 2018 Annual Meeting of the Society. McGovern was named a pioneer in digital preservation by the Library of Congress in 2010. McGovern was previously a research assistant professor and digital preservation officer at the Inter-university Consortium for Political and Social Research (ICPSR) at the University of Michigan and Director of Research and Assessment Services and digital preservation officer at Cornell University. McGovern's work has focused on digital preservation and practice since 1986, when she became senior staff of the Center for Electronic Records at the U.S. National Archives and Records Administration.

In 2003, while working at Cornell, McGovern, with Anne R. Kenney, co-developed the Digital Preservation Management Workshop for digital preservation managers. The workshops and online tutorial she co-developed has been widely used by practitioners and academic programs since 2003, having been offered more than 60 times since 2003 to attendees from more than 30 countries.

Since 2022 Dr. McGovern is the Director for Digital Preservation Instruction and Practice with Global Archivist LLC a consulting, coaching, and training small-business.

=== Education ===
- PhD, Archival Studies, University College London, 2009
- MA, History, Northeastern University, 1983, certificate in archives administration
- BA, History, Saint Anselm College, 1982

=== Honors ===
- Emmett Leahy Award for Outstanding Contributions to the Information and Records Management Profession, 2023.
- Distinguished Fellow, Society of American Archivists, 2009.
- SAA Preservation Publication Award: Aligning National Approaches to Digital Preservation (ANADP), volume editor, 2013.
- Digital Preservation Pioneer, NDIIPP, 2010.
- SAA Preservation Publication Award: Digital Preservation Management, online tutorial, 2004.
- Research Fellow, Study of Modern Archives, Bentley Historical Library, 1994.
