= Emmett Leahy =

American entrepreneur

Emmett Joseph Leahy
- Born: December 24, 1910; Washington, D.C., U.S.
- Died: June 23, 1964 (aged 53)
- Occupation: Archivist
- Known for: Records management

Emmett Joseph Leahy (December 24, 1910 – June 23, 1964) was an American archivist and entrepreneur. He was a pioneer in the discipline of records management. After working in the National Archives and then during World War II in the United States Navy, he entered private business as a consultant in records management and as a records storage provider. He also participated in the two Hoover Commissions in improving the efficiency and effectiveness of government.

== Early years (1910–1934) ==
Emmett Joseph Leahy was born on December 24, 1910, in Washington, D.C. His parents were immigrants from southern Ireland. In 1928 he became a probationer in a Catholic Church teaching order, the Brothers of the Christian Schools. He attended La Salle College in Pennsylvania, obtained a bachelor's degree from Catholic University of America, and studied at the graduate level at Catholic University and the University of Pittsburgh. He left the Brothers of the Christian Schools order in 1934. Later he studied at Harvard University and the American University.

== National archives (1934–1941) ==
Leahy worked for a short time with the Federal Trade Commission. He then joined the National Archives in July 1935. He was assigned to a committee to examine records that had been submitted to the archivist but had no permanent value or historical interest. The committee soon came to the conclusion that the federal agencies needed to manage their records more systematically, and segregate temporary records from those with more permanent value. Leahy did much to create a program to define the records life-cycle from creation and use through eventual destruction or archiving. He also studied the great numbers of useless or duplicate records in many federal agencies.

In 1938 Leahy spent nine months in Europe studying how governments there reduced the volume of archival material. His article on Reduction of Public Records summarized his findings from analysis of archives and registry administrations in Europe and Egypt, and the ways in which they eliminated valueless public records. He rejected the view of Sir Hilary Jenkinson of the United Kingdom that archivists should not be involved in this process because they would no longer be seen as impartial. He described processes for defining classes of valueless records, storing them and defining standard times when they would be destroyed, with records of their destruction.

Leahy became a leader of the effort to introduce records management in the federal government. He was chairman of the Committee on Reduction of Archival Material of the Society of American Archivists, which later became later the Committee on Records Administration. In 1941 Leahy made the case to the Bureau of the Budget for establishing records officers in the main federal departments and agencies, with a Council of Records Administration based in the Bureau of the Budget. The United States Civil Service Commission established the Interdepartmental Committee on Records Administration later in 1941. Leahy was a member of the steering committee, and represented first the National Archives and then the Navy Department on this committee.

== United States Navy (1941–1945) ==
During World War II (1939–1945) Leahy transferred to the United States Department of the Navy in September 1941 as director of records coordination. In October 1942 he was made a lieutenant commander in the United States Navy Reserve. He was director of the navy's Office of Records Administration until November 1945, when he was released from active duty.

Leahy pioneered the concept of saving space by holding inactive records in high-density storage units in record centers. The navy's Archival Service established the federal government's first intermediate records centers, releasing floor space and filing cabinets for use in the war effort. Naval records centers were established by Leahy in Virginia, Pennsylvania, New York, California, and Hawaii.

He also introduced procedures to manage active files and correspondence, and to microfilm large and important records, and records for which security back-up was required. This included millions of microfilm copies of engineering drawings of aircraft, ordnance and ships for use in repairs. He introduced the "Correspondex" system of standardized letters and paragraphs for routine correspondence, greatly reducing manual effort. His innovations reduced costs by $21 million in the navy, for which he was awarded the Navy Commendation Ribbon.

== Business career (1945–1964) ==
After leaving the navy in 1945 Leahy joined Remington Rand and worked for two years in the management consultant and microfilming divisions. He developed the ideas of defining a life cycle for records, and of producing statistics on the costs of keeping records. In 1948 Leahy obtained funding from the Rockefeller Foundation to found the non-profit National Records Management Council. This organization developed educational material concerning records management, and helped private and public organizations improve records management. Leahy became its executive director.

In 1948 Leahy founded a consultancy, Leahy & Co., to help local governments such as New York City keep control of the size of their records. From 1949 he acquired corporate customers including Eastern Air Lines, DuPont, Bethlehem Steel and Alcoa. Leahy & Co. reported profits of $100,000 in 1951. That year he founded Leahy Business Archives, based in New York City, which provided secure facilities for private businesses to store inactive records.

Leahy resigned from the National Records Management Council in 1953 to focus on his private consultancy and records storage business. The work he had done for the federal government gave great credibility to these enterprises. In 1953 he founded Leahy Archives Inc., which took over the Business Archives Center. (Note: In 1988 Leahy Business Archives was merged with Instar, Inc. to form Leahy-Instar Inc. In 1990 this firm was purchased by L.W. Pierce & Co., which changed its name to Pierce Leahy Corporation.) He was president of Leahy and Co. and Leahy Archives Inc. when he died of a cerebral thrombosis on 23 June 1964.

== Hoover Commissions ==
From 1947 to 1949 Leahy served on the first Commission on the Organization of the Executive Branch of Government (Hoover Commission) chaired by former President Herbert Hoover. On this commission he proposed that records management should be concerned with efficiency and cost-effectiveness, and should be treated separately from historical archiving.

Leahy's October 1948 Report on Records Management recommended that the National Archives and all other non-current government repositories of records be placed under a newly created Federal Records Administration, which would operate Federal Records Centers. It also recommended a Federal Records Management Act to provide the legal framework for life cycle management of federal government records, and a records officer of each federal department and agency. The proposal to separate records administration from archives was rejected, but the new National Archives and Records Administration was placed under the new General Services Administration as Leahy wanted. The Federal Records Act was passed in 1950 and ensured that all federal departments and agencies had a program for records management.

In 1953 Leahy was appointed head of the Task Force on Paperwork Management in Government, part of the second Hoover Commission to reduce costs and improve efficiency and service in the federal government. His task force showed that millions of dollars could be saved annually through government-wide paperwork management processes.

== Publications ==
- Leahy, Emmett J. (1939), Reduction of Public Records
- Leahy, Emmett J. (1941), Records Administration and the National Emergency
- Leahy, Emmett J.; Bahmer, Robert H.; Holdcamper, Forrest R. (1941), Bulletin no. 3, The Care of Records in a National Emergency, National Archives
- Leahy, Emmett J. (1942), Records Administration and the War, National Archives
- Leahy, Emmett J. (1949), Records Management in the United States Government, U.S. Government Printing Office

== Sources ==
- Angel, Herbert E. (October 1964), "Emmett Joseph Leahy 1910-1964", The American Archivist, 27 (4), Society of American Archivists: 507–509, doi:10.17723/aarc.27.4.424613q66812t755, JSTOR 40291012
- Duranti, Luciana; Franks, Patricia C. (April 26, 2019), "Emmett Leahy (1910–1964)", Encyclopedia of Archival Writers, 1515 - 2015, Rowman & Littlefield Publishers, ISBN 978-1-5381-2580-9
- Emmett J. Leahy (1910-1964), Emmett Leahy Award
- Pierce Leahy Corporation History, Funding Universe
