= Mike Loades =

British television director

- Occupations: writer, television presenter, director, military historian.

Mike Loades is a British writer, television presenter, director, and military historian.

== Career ==
As a television presenter/host he is best known for the BBC series' Time Commanders (2003-2005) and Weapons That Made Britain (2004) for Channel 4, Medieval Tournament: Making of a Knight (2003) for Channel 4 and Discovery Channel, Weapon Masters (2007) for Discovery Networks, and Going Medieval (2012) for H2. Loades appears regularly in television history documentaries as a military historian/historical weapons specialist. He also works as a director for television and as a historical consultant for the video games industry. Additionally he works as a fight choreographer/action arranger, who specializes in historical combat.

Loades has had several books published on arms and armour topics in addition to one about the history of dogs. He provided commentary about the Battle of the Teutoburg Forest in a short documentary for the videogame Total War: Rome 2 in addition to directing other short documentaries for the franchise - The Throwing War and Legionary Kit. While referring to Assassin's Creed, which he had worked as a consultant to Black Flag, he said that he was "blown away" by the work that was put in by the video game industry to make their work more historically authentic.

For Age of Empires IV, he wrote and directed nineteen short films that were embedded in the game as mini-documentaries titled Hands-On-History

== Filmography ==
Loades has directed on related history in several television drama/documentary specials, including:

- How the Silk Road Made the World (2019, NHNZ)
- The Celts,Blood,Iron and Sacrifice (2015) ep1
- Going Medieval (2012)
- USS Constellation - Battling For Freedom, Indigo Films for History Channel 2007
- The Hunt For Lincoln's Assassin, Indigo Films for National Geographic channel 2006
- The Plot to Kill Jesse James, Indigo Films for History Channel 2006
- The Plot to Kill Reagan, Indigo Films for History Channel 2005
- Weapons That Made Britain 2004
- Timeline ‘’The Peasants’ Revolt’’ with Tony Richardson
- Meet the Ancestors Se4 Ep1 ‘’The killing field’’ 2001 * Crusades with Terry Jones 1995 *Archery - Its History and Forms, Running Wolf Productions 1995 (video)
- Blow by Blow Guide to Swordfighting, Running Wolf Productions 1991 (video)

== Bibliography ==
- Swords and Swordsmen 2010 Pen and Sword Books ISBN 1-84884-133-7
- The Longbow 2013 Osprey Publishing ISBN 978-1-78200-085-3
- The Composite Bow 2016 Osprey PublishingISBN 978-1-4728-0591 1
- The Crossbow 2017 Osprey Publishing ISBN 978-1-4728-2460-8
- War Bows 2019 Osprey Publishing ISBN 978-1-4728-2553-7
- DOGS: Working Origins and Traditional Tasks 2020, White Owl Books ISBN 1-52674-2306
- The Worldwide History of Warfare (contributing author) 2009 Abe Books ISBN 978-0-5002-8799-6
- Masters of the Steppe (contributing author) 2017 ISBN 978-1-7896-9647-9
