= Weapons That Made Britain =

Television documentary

Weapons That Made Britain is a British 2004 television documentary series.

It was made by independent production company Lion Television (now part of All3media) for Channel 4. It was presented by film fight coordinator and medieval weapons trainer, Mike Loades. The Executive Producer across the series was Bill Locke.

The 5 × 1 hour series explores different weapons and defensive technologies related to key historical events. Throughout the programmes, Mike Loades, visits pivotal battlefields, historical buildings and museums and talks with historians and weapons specialists. The series included re-enactments and scientific experiments to test some of the principal weapons, defensive tools and armour of medieval Britain.

The series was first broadcast in the UK on Channel 4 in July 2004, and was afterwards shown on the History Channel in December 2004.

== Episodes ==
- Episode 1: Sword
  - First aired on Saturday 10 July 2004.
  - Producer and Director Tanya Cheadle
  - This episode focuses on the Battle of Barnet during the Wars of the Roses.
- Episode 2: Longbow
  - First aired on Saturday 17 July 2004.
  - Producer and Director Sabine Pusch
  - This episode focuses on the Battle of Crecy during the Hundred Years' War.
- Episode 3: Lance
  - First aired on Saturday 24 July 2004.
  - Producer and Director George Pagliero
  - This episode focuses on the Battle of Lewes and the Battle of Bannockburn
- Episode 4: Shield
  - First aired on Saturday 31 July 2004.
  - Producer and Director Peter Sommer
  - This episode focuses on the Battle of Eddington.
- Episode 5: Armour
  - First aired on Saturday 7 August 2004.
  - Producer and Director Tom McCarthy
  - This episode focuses upon the Battle of Verneuil during the Hundred Years' War.
