= Warrior Challenge =

- series logo, taken from website
- Genre: Reality television
- Directed by: Mike Ibeji
- Original language: English
- No. of seasons: 1
- No. of episodes: 4

Original release
- Network: PBS
- Release: May 6, 2003 – 2003

Warrior Challenge was a 2003 PBS reality television series. The show, produced by WNET in association with Channel 5 in Britain, premiered May 6, 2003 and lasted four episodes.

The show involved volunteer American and British military personnel and public workers competing in historically accurate simulations of military life in the given time period. Along the way, the competitors vied in challenges. Unlike reality shows on commercial networks, there was no winner of the show; thus, no prizes were awarded. John Waller, an expert in ancient and medieval arms and armor, served as the trainer while the British medieval historian Dr. David Carpenter served as a historical consultant.

While the show appeared to be a response to the reality craze that Survivor created, the show's executive producer Beth Hoppe claimed that the show's objective was to "show what modern people do when they're faced with these historic challenges."

== List of episodes ==
The following is a list of Warrior Challenge episodes:

1. "Romans" (May 6, 2003)
2. "Knights" (May 13, 2003)
3. "Vikings" (May 20, 2003)
4. "Gladiators" (May 27, 2003)

== Related programmes ==
The series followed from social history documentaries on UK television based on historical reconstructions, including the 2001 series Timewatch: Roman Soldiers to be. and Surviving the Iron Age, a 2001 update of the original 1978 experiment in Iron Age living Living in the Past. Another series which was similar to Warrior Challenge and aired at around the same time was Conquest, which aired on the History Channel from 2002–2003, and was hosted by Peter Woodward.
