= Ronald Milne =

British librarian (born 1957)

- Born: 14 February 1957; Duns, Scotland
- Education: University of Edinburgh
- Scientific career
- Fields: Librarian
- Workplaces: Oxford University Library Services; British Library; Alexander Turnbull Library; Yale-NUS College

Ronald Milne FRSE (born 14 February 1957) is a British librarian and administrator whose work has been particularly associated with the development of library research collections and with issues of digitisation of library materials. In 2006 he became a Fellow of The Royal Society of Edinburgh.

== Career ==
Ronald Milne was born in Duns, in the Scottish Borders, and studied German at the University of Edinburgh; he gained professional library qualifications at University College London. After holding library posts at the University of Glasgow, Trinity College Cambridge and King's College London, in 1998 he was appointed Director of the Research Support Libraries Programme which aimed to promote access and collaboration among research libraries in the UK. In 2002 he became Deputy Director of the Bodleian Libraries (then known as Oxford University Library Services, since renamed after its largest and oldest constituent library, the Bodleian Library) and two years later its Acting Director. In 2007 he moved to the British Library as Director of Scholarship and Collections. In 2009 he became Associate Chief Librarian (Research Collections) at the Alexander Turnbull Library in Wellington, New Zealand. In December 2011 he moved to New Zealand's Ministry for Culture and Heritage where he was appointed Deputy Chief Executive and Heritage Services Branch Manager. In December 2016 he took up the post of Dean of Educational Resources & Technology at Yale-NUS College in Singapore.

== Research libraries ==
The Research Support Libraries Programme (RSLP) was a three-year government-funded initiative, running from 1999 to 2002, which sought to enhance the value of research collections in British libraries in three main directions: to improve the arrangements for access to collections by researchers; to provide support for humanities and social science research collections; to support collaborative activities among research libraries across different sectors – national, academic, public and independent libraries. As director of the programme, Ronald Milne had a central role in promoting its principles and coordinating its participants in a series of projects whose budgets amounted in total to around £30 million. Underpinning these initiatives was the concept of a "Distributed National Collection", in recognition of the inability of even the best-funded research libraries to continue collecting comprehensively in their areas of interest. The RSLP projects sought to create a foundation for collaborative work in subject collection descriptions and catalogues to facilitate access for researchers.

Within the strands of funding available for collection management projects and for research support for humanities and social sciences collections the John Rylands University Library of Manchester collaborated in 14 bids and eight of these were successful (in the bid related to Arabic and Persian research materials the library was the project leader). The other strand provided grants to compensate libraries for providing services to research staff and research students from other institutions who made use of the library's holdings in particular fields. These grants were made for the three years 1999/2000, 2000/01 & 2001/02; RSLP stated that "this is an activity which is of growing importance, and very much within the spirit of extending collaborative access to research facilities, but which is not currently supported through any of the other funding schemes". The amounts received by the top four institutions were as follows: University of Oxford £812,601; University of Cambridge £566,345; University of London (including Senate House, Institute of Advanced Legal Studies, Warburg Institute & Institute of Historical Research) £314,771; University of Manchester (JRULM & Manchester Business School Library £282,230.

== Digitisation ==
The digitisation of collections so as to enable web access to their content became a major preoccupation of libraries from the late 1990s onwards, and numerous projects to provide digital versions of prestigious manuscripts and early books were undertaken by individual libraries. One of the most notable large-scale projects was the Google Library Project, and while in Oxford Ronald Milne played a significant role in making the Bodleian Library the first UK contributor of material. The Google project provoked much controversy internationally, particularly in relation to issues of copyright, but the Bodleian minimised criticism by restricting its contribution to 19th century publications which were out of copyright. In his advocacy of the project, Ronald Milne stressed that its primary purpose was to improve access to research materials through their electronic availability rather than to create an alternative format for their preservation: "digitisation on such a scale represents a revolution in the dissemination of information that parallels the impact of the invention of printing from moveable type in the 15th century." The need for libraries to preserve their printed and digital materials was a theme that informed his work both at the Bodleian Library and at the British Library; these concerns were also reflected in his chairmanship of the National Preservation Office Board and the Digital Preservation Coalition.
