= Charles M. Dollar =

Charles M. Dollar is an expert on the life cycle management of electronic records, particularly electronic records archiving. He pioneered research into digital preservation of electronic records.

== Early life and education ==
Dollar was born in Memphis, Tennessee, and earned his Bachelor of Arts from Union University before earning a PhD at the University of Kentucky.

== Career ==
He was a history professor at Oklahoma State University (1968–1974), and coauthor of A Historian's Guide to Statistics He then became the electronic records program manager at the National Archives and Records Administration (1974–1994), an archival educator at the University of British Columbia (1994–1999), and a Senior Consultant at Cohasset Associates (1999 to the present), he was a pioneer in establishing the electronic records preservation program of the National Archives in the 1970s. He had a major leadership role in early efforts of the Society of American Archivists and the International Council on Archives to address the challenges of electronic records. He served on the Standards Board of the Association of Information and Image Management and Technical Committee 171 of the International Organization for Standardization and was the author of ISO 18492, Long Term Preservation of Electronic Document-Based Information (2005). His book on The Impact of Information Technology on Archives Theory and Practice (1993) and Authentic Electronic Records: Strategies for Long Term Access (1997) advanced the profession's understanding of the challenges of digital preservation.

While on the staff of the National Archives, Dollar organized and directed the first electronic records program for the United States Federal government and subsequently had a major role in research projects on digital technology standards, digital storage media, and digital imaging applications in electronic archiving. In 1994, Dollar joined the Graduate Faculty of the School of Library, Information, and Archival Studies at the University of British Columbia, where he taught in the Archival Studies Program.

Over four decades he has published articles in archival and records management journals, including The Impact of Information Technologies on Archival Principles and Methods. Dollar was the 2005 recipient of the Emmett Leahy Award, which recognizes an individual whose contributions and outstanding accomplishments have had a major impact on the records and information management profession.

== Select bibliography ==
- Dollar, Charles M. Archival Theory and Information Technologies: The Impact of Information Technologies on Archival Principles and Methods Macerata, Italy: University of Macerata, 1992. (ISBN 88-7663201-8)
- Dollar, Charles M. Authentic Electronic Records: Long-Term Access Strategies. Chicago: Cohasset Associates, 1999. (ISBN 0-9700640-0-4)

== See also ==
- Digital obsolescence
- Digital preservation
