= Laura Millar =

Laura Agnes Millar is an independent consultant and scholar in records, archives, and information management who has also worked in publishing and distance education. She has consulted with governments, universities, colleges, professional associations, non-profit organizations, and other agencies in Canada and around the world.

== Career ==
=== Education ===
She received her Master of Archival Studies degree from the University of British Columbia in 1984 and her PhD in archival science from University College London in 1996.

=== Publications ===
A prolific writer, Millar has published dozens of articles in peer reviewed journals on the administration of archives, including documentary editing. She was awarded the Association of Canadian Archivists' William Kaye Lamb prize twice, for articles published in Archivaria in 2003 and 2015. She has also written a number of books on information management including The Story Behind the Book: Preserving Authors' and Publishers' Archives, published by Simon Fraser University in 2009. She was named the winner of the Society of American Archivists' 2011 Waldo Gifford Leland Award for Archives: Principles and Practices now in its second edition and recognized by universities and colleges internationally as a standard textbook in archival management. Her latest book A Matter of Facts: The Value of Evidence in the Information Age, was co-published by the American Library Association and the Society of American Archivists in June 2019. Millar has worked with such diverse groups as the Taku River Tlingit First Nations, the United Nations, the International Records Management Trust, the Government of Hong Kong, the Alaska State Archives, the Government of Bermuda, the Open University of Sri Lanka, the Government of Alberta and McGill University.

Millar received the University of British Columbia's SLAIS Alumni Service and Leadership Award in 2011 and made a Fellow of the Association of Canadian Archivists in 2016. In 2017 she was identified as a "Change Maker": a designation given by the British Columbia Museums Association to British Columbians who have made a "substantial contribution to the cultural field" in the province. In January 2018 she was appointed an Honorary Senior Research Associate at University College London, England.

=== Today ===
Her present research interests include the concept of record-keeping and the relationship between information, knowledge, and personal and social memory. She is also studying the relationship between human rights and record-keeping around the world.

Millar lives with her husband in the community of Roberts Creek, on the Sunshine Coast of British Columbia, Canada.
