= Digital Preservation Coalition =

Global organization based in Scotland

- Digital Preservation Coalition
- Abbreviation: DPC
- Formation: 2002
- Legal status: Charity
- Purpose: digital preservation community of practice
- Location: University of Glasgow
- Region served: Global
- Members: Global digital content agencies, libraries and archives
- Executive Director: William Kilbride
- Main organ: DPC Board
- Affiliations: JISC
- Website: DPC

The Digital Preservation Coalition (DPC) is a UK-based charity that works with global partners to 'a welcoming and inclusive global community, working together to bring about a sustainable future for our digital assets'.

== Background ==
The origins of the DPC are rooted in a 1995 workshop put on by the Joint Information Systems Committee and the British Library at the University of Warwick, focusing on how to approach the digital preservation. Internet usage was rapidly increasing, user expectations of digital resources were greater, and more users and institutions were seeking information across international borders in the late-20th century. The scholastic community at large was apprehensive to make a serious effort toward converting to digital systems without more permanent solutions to ensure the integrity and authenticity of electronic resources, due to the instability experienced in some U.S. government archives that was generated by physical decay of storage media and obsolete hardware and software. The 1995 workshop at the University of Warwick led to research into the various necessary elements of digital preservation, which concluded in 1999. Proposals for the DPC were published in D-lib magazine in February 2001, began operations in July of the same year, and officially launched at the House of Commons in February 2002. DPC was incorporated on 23 July 2002 and registered as a charity in June 2021.

The DPC was originally established with an office at King's College London before moving to the University of York with Maggie Jones who was the DPC's first full time member of staff. A new office was added at the University of Glasgow in 2009 when William Kilbride was appointed Executive Director. In 2019 DPC reached agreement to open an additional office at the University of Melbourne and at the start of 2024 it announced an agreement with ITHAKA to establish a permanent staff presence based in New York.

== Mission and activities ==
The DPC was formed to bring together various public sector organizations to come up with a solution to the growing digital preservation issue as it was deemed too difficult for any one entity to achieve that goal on their own. Their goal was to create resources, tools, and standards to establish a universal approach to digital preservation. Even though the DPC was originally concerned with digital preservation in the UK, they acknowledged the fact that their concern over digital preservation was shared on a global scale. In recent years DPC has adopted a more international perspective, identifying digital preservation as a global challenge and acknowledging the need for a global community to meet that challenge.

=== Technology Watch Reports ===
The DPC's founding mission included the development and promotion of good practice in what was an emergent field. A series of commissioned subject-specialist Technology Watch Reports was established in 2003 and the first report published in 2004. The series continues to publish with around 50 titles in the series. It is supported by a series of briefing days in which authors and stakeholder debate the themes of the report.

=== Workforce development and training ===
The resources, tools and standards were not only created by the DPC to be applied at institutions with existing digital collections, but to teach anyone the fundamentals and best practices of digital preservation. Their primary resource for teaching the proper methods for digital preservation was originally called the Preservation Management of Digital Materials Handbook, compiled by Maggie Jones and Neil Beagrie in 2001, two former directors of the DPC. Continuously updated, the handbook offers an easy to follow set of instructions for applying all aspects of the digital preservation process. The handbook has not been available in hardcopy since 2007, but was previously uploaded to the DPC website in 2002. It underwent a major overhaul by the DPC in 2015 and was republished on their website as the 2nd edition of the Digital Preservation Handbook. The DPC also created training workshops in order to help their members effectively implement the processes laid out in the handbook. Their most recent training workshop was branded "Novice to Know-How", a program commissioned by the National Archives of the UK as a part of their "Plugged In, Powered Up" initiative. Launched in May 2020, the two day course included lessons on file format preservation, a primer on DROID, and ingesting and preserving digital materials.

=== Advocacy ===
The DPC was operating in a new aspect of the digital frontier, one that was otherwise unknown to the public at large. They increased overall media coverage of digital preservation from a non-existent presence to one that was regularly being covered by various news outlets across print, television, and radio. They released regular reports that were easy to digest, hosted frequent forums and seminars, and published a quarterly periodical on their website. Since 2017 the DPC has published an annual, community generated review of the risks facing digital materials called the 'BitList, or the Global List of Endangered Digital Materials.

==== Digital Preservation Awards ====
Beginning in 2004, the DPC sponsors the Biennial Digital Preservation Awards, originally through the Pilgrim Trust Conservation Awards which presented 5,000 GBP to entities that exemplify digital preservation leadership and achievement. In 2022 the DPC made awards in 8 categories including the DPC 'Fellowship'.

==== Fellowship of the Digital Preservation Coalition ====
Every two years since 2016 the DPC has awarded a special prize known as the 'DPC Fellowship' to recognize an individual who has made 'substantial, generous and distinguished contribution to securing our digital legacy'.

- Brewster Kahle (2016)
- Barbara Sierman (2018)
- Micky Lindlar (2020)
- Neil Beagrie (2022)
- Adrian Brown (2022)
- Professor Denise DeVries (2022)
- Nancy Y. McGovern (2022)
- Professor Zhang Xiaolin (2022)
- Gladys Kemboi (2024)

== Membership ==
The DPC began with 7 original members and quickly expanded to 26 within the first year of operations. Membership was originally broken into three categories: Full Members, Associate Members, and Allied Organizations and Individuals (now referred to as Honorary Personal Members). The DPC's foundation established that it would be 'vendor and technology neutral', so technology providers and software companies cannot join the DPC or become involved in the DPC's governance.

=== Full members ===
Full members originally were give seats on the DPC's Board By around 2014 this body had grown too large so in 2017 the DPC introduced a smaller Executive Board limited to 12 people with a larger Representative Council of full members which sets and oversees implementation of the Coalition's strategic plan.

=== Associate members ===
Associate members are organizations that were limited to interacting with the Advisory Council of the Coalition and participating in all other projects.

=== Allied organizations and individuals ===
Allied Organizations are entities that were invited by the DPC to participate in projects because they other either specific knowledge or special access to industry leaders in digital preservation. These partnerships can either exist for a set amount of time while completing a specific project or can be ongoing partnerships that come to a close when either the DPC or the allied organization deem necessary. Allied Individuals, now called Honorary Personal Members, are also invited because of their expertise and their inability to qualify as a member. Honorary Personal Members are automatically renewed unless otherwise stated.

=== Current membership ===
As of 2025, there were over 180 combined Full and Associate Members, including: Bacardi-Martini Inc., the BBC, the Digital Curation Centre, the J. Paul Getty Trust, the Library of Congress, the United Nations HQ, and National Libraries across the globe, other international corporate entities, and many universities across the UK and North America.

== Leadership ==
The Chair of the DPC is elected annually by the members at its AGM.

- Dame Lynne Brindley, Chair 2002-2006
- Ronald Milne, Chair 2006-2009
- Bruno Longmore, Acting Chair 2009
- Richard Ovenden, Chair 2009-2013
- Laura Mitchell, Chair 2013-2017
- Juan Bicarregui, Chair 2017-2023
- Professor Jane Winters 2023 (incumbent)

== See also ==
- Conservation-restoration of cultural heritage
- Digital curation
- Digital object identifier
- Digital preservation
- Framework Programmes for Research and Technological Development
