= Digital Curation Centre =

Non-profit organization

Coordinates: 55°56′48″N 3°12′04″W

Digital Curation Centre (DCC)
- Formation: 2005; 21 years ago
- Purpose: Digital curation
- Headquarters: Edinburgh, Scotland, United Kingdom
- Parent organization: Jisc
- Website: http://www.dcc.ac.uk

The Digital Curation Centre (DCC) was established to help solve the extensive challenges of digital preservation and digital curation and to lead research, development, advice, and support services for higher education institutions in the United Kingdom.

Throughout its history the DCC has been an active organisation in the realm of digital preservation. In partnership with other institutions, the DCC has created and developed tools for tackling issues in digital preservation and curation. Such tools include a lifecycle model for data curation, a risk assessment for digital repositories, and an interview protocol to assist institutions in understanding their research data collections.

Since July 2016, the DCC is no longer supported by Jisc funding.

== Purpose ==
The original call to establish the DCC described its function as

"...to provide a national focus for research into curation issues and expertise in the processes of digital archiving, preservation and management. Particular emphasis will be placed on the needs of users of the Centre's outputs."

Scientists, researchers and scholars across the UK generate increasingly vast amounts of digital data, with further investment in digitization and purchase of digital content and information. The scientific record and the documentary heritage created in digital form are at risk from obsolescence, from the fragility of digital media, and from lack of the basics of good practice, such as adequate documentation for the data.

== Activities ==
Working with other practitioners, the DCC supports UK institutions who store, manage and preserve these data to help ensure their enhancement and their continuing long-term use. The DCC also provides a national focus for research and development into digital curation issues and to promote expertise and good practice, both national and international, for the management of all research outputs in digital format.

It provides information about tools developed by the DCC and others which support all parts of the digital curation lifecycle. It provides training in the use of tools and other aspects of digital curation. It provides online tools, such as the Data Management Planning tool, to support the creation and management of research data. Another tool developed by the DCC, the DCC Curation Lifecycle Model, provides a pictorial representation of the steps and behaviours necessary to the curation and preservation of digital objects.

The DCC runs a number of regular events to support different aspects of its mission. The International Digital Curation Conference (IDCC) acts as a focus for research activity in digital curation as well as reports of practice. The Research Data Management Forum brings together practitioners from a wide range of backgrounds including government, publishers, researchers and funders, to focus on particular topics of common interest. The Data Management Roadshows aim to raise awareness amongst UK universities of the assistance that the DCC can offer with establishing or improving research data services.

== Developments ==
=== Curation Lifecycle Model ===
The Curation Lifecycle Model, developed by the DCC, was first published in 2007 and finalised in 2008. It is a graphic which describes the overarching digital curation process with archival and preservation processes being only portions of this overall digital curation process. The model outlines various curation actions. There are full lifecycle actions, which include description and representation information, preservation planning, community watch and participation, and curate and preserve. There are sequential actions, which include conceptualise; create or receive; appraise and select; ingest; preservation action; store; access, use, and reuse; and transform. Finally, there are occasional actions, which include dispose, reappraise, and migrate.

Full lifecycle actions are reoccurring actions that pertain to each phase of a digital object or databases’ lifecycle and curation process. The full lifecycle actions indicate the need to create quality metadata to represent a digital object, the importance of planning how to preserve an object throughout the entirety of the curation process, the necessity of collaborating with a community in order to adapt new standards, and the essential task of adhering to any preconceived steps to manage the curation and preservation of the digital object.

Sequential actions, unlike full lifecycle actions, occur in a particular order as part of a digital object’s curation lifecycle. These steps are always performed in order, though can be repeated indefinitely as long as the object’s curation continues to be a priority.

Occasional actions including dispose, reappraise, and migrate represent activities undertaken only when certain criteria regarding the object’s lifecycle are met. For example, when an object is appraised (a sequential action that always occurs in the lifecycle of a digital object’s curation) if it adheres to or, more aptly, doesn’t adhere to certain institutional curation policies, it can be disposed of or reappraised—both of which are occasional actions in the lifecycle.

The DCC Curation Lifecycle Model is especially relevant to three key participants in the digital curation process: data creators, data archivists, and data reusers. The model highlights the importance of data creation, such as metadata, in successful, sustainable curation practices. This is relevant to data creators. Data archivists will find the model beneficial as an outline of the necessary processes to guarantee the thoroughness of their curation actions. Finally, because the model outlines the aforementioned steps, it prompts the successful curation of data and, therefore, the ability of that data to be accessed in the future and reused.

=== Digital Repository Audit Method Based on Risk Assessment ===
DRAMBORA or the Digital Repository Audit Method Based on Risk Assessment is another development of both the DCC and DigitalPreservationEurope. This is a tool, published in 2007, which can be used by digital repositories to self-assess their own organisations and the preservation activities undertaken therein. It was developed in the aspiration of working toward a standardised certification of all digital repositories. The DRAMBORA methodology acts as a checklist to ensure that a particular institution adheres to a set of standards. The self-assessment undertaken using the DRAMBORA methodology is intended to determine weaknesses within a digital repository that could affect its credibility.

=== Data Asset Framework ===
The Data Asset Framework or DAF is a data audit methodology developed by HATII at the University of Glasgow in conjunction with the Digital Curation Centre. Originally the Data Audit Framework, the Data Asset Framework is an interview protocol utilised by educational institutions to better understand their growing research data collections. With this tool, institutions can learn to manage their data more effectively. The audit allows institutions to assess their data collections, determine their state, and measure the worth of the data through the assessment of "five core questions:

1. What data assets currently exist?

2. Where are these assets located?

3. How have these been managed to date?

4. Which of these assets need to be maintained in the long term?

5. Do current data management practices place these assets at risk?"

By performing this audit, a comprehensive registry of data assets is compiled, which can then be used by the institution to improve their management of those assets. The intent of DAF is to raise awareness within an institution regarding their data management practices. Auditing data assets creates a better understanding of the digital collections owned by an institution and allows them to more efficiently organise their data, structure their data, and determine accountability for said data, all while minimising the potential loss of assets in the future and increasing accessibility. The goal of the Data Asset Framework is to create a standard for the management of a library’s research data that can then be utilised industry-wide.

== History ==
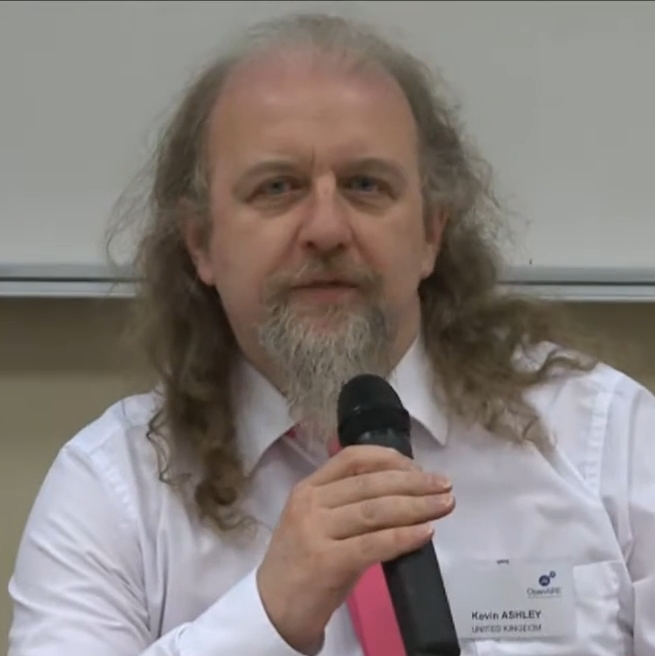
Kevin Ashley, Director of the Digital Curation Centre (since 2010)

Jisc took a decision to establish the Digital Curation Centre some time in 2002, having funded a number of projects in the field of digital preservation. Jisc's then digital preservation focus, Neil Beagrie, recognised that a number of the more compelling challenges required more than simple preservation of materials. The term digital curation was coined to refer to more active long-term management of digital material. The original call for bids to run the center was withdrawn in July 2003, allowing the UK's e-science programme to add funding for a 4-year research programme to complement the work on education and advocacy funded by Jisc. The revised call from July 2003 required bids by 2003-09-18 with an intention to establish the DCC early in 2004. The range of expertise required meant that the funders expected to see collaborative, multi-centre bids. A number were shortlisted with the winning bid chosen on 2003-11-26. Led by the University of Edinburgh (involving its School of Informatics, the National e-Science Centre (NeSC), the EDINA national data centre and the AHRC Centre for the Studies in Intellectual Property and Technology Law) the winning consortium also included HATII at the University of Glasgow, UKOLN at the University of Bath, and the Science and Technology Facilities Council (STFC).

The DCC began operations early in 2004, with a formal launch on 5 November of that year at Edinburgh's e-science institute. Although it was intended that the centre would be inaugurated by the Duke of Edinburgh, then the university's Chancellor, he instead had to attend the funeral of Princess Alice and his place was taken by Lord Sutherland of Houndwood. The first Acting Director was Peter Burnhill, head of EDINA. He was succeeded by Chris Rusbridge from 2005-02-21 who served until 2010-04-19, when he was succeeded by Kevin Ashley. The original Associate Directors were David Giaretta STFC, Liz Lyon University of Bath, and Seamus Ross HATII.

Following the initial 3-year grant, Jisc funded two further phases of work at the DCC commencing in 2007 and 2010. The latter continued until March 2013. Research funding from the e-science core program did not continue after the core program itself was wound up. The DCC has continued research and development activities funded by a wide range of grants from other sources.

In 2011, the DCC received additional funding from HEFCE's Universities Modernisation Fund (UMF) to run a pilot program implementing IT infrastructure for shared services.

In 2016, the DCC was no longer supported by Jisc and UKOLN’s operations ceased. DCC's partnership was continued by the Universities of Edinburgh and Glasgow.

== See also ==
- Digital Repository Audit Method Based on Risk Assessment
- Framework Programmes for Research and Technological Development
