= Digital curation =

Process of managing digital assets

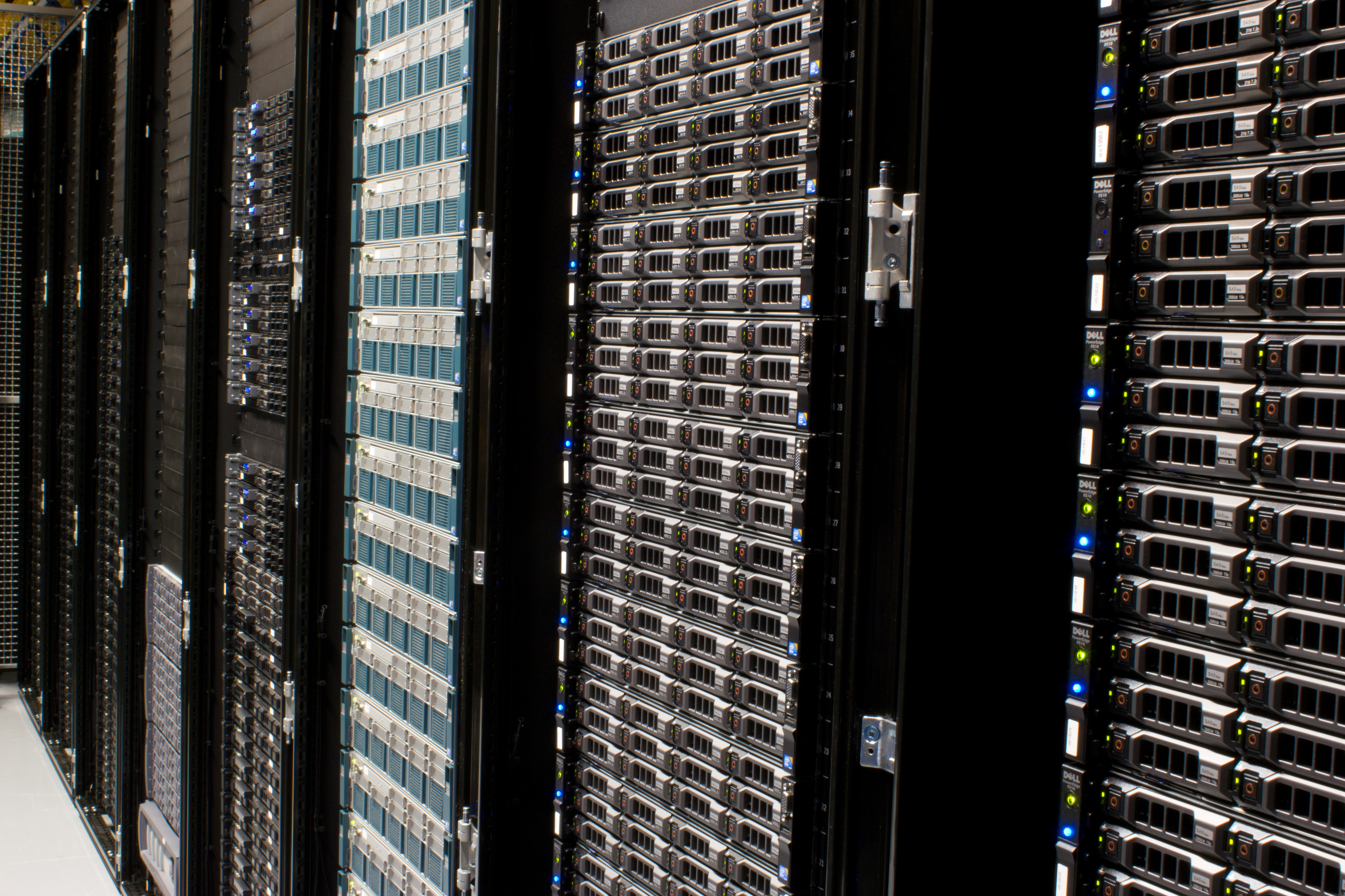
Servers of the Wikimedia Foundation, a large digital curator, in 2012

Digital curation is the selection, preservation, maintenance, collection, and archiving of digital assets. It is a process that establishes, maintains, and adds value to repositories of digital data for present and future use. The implementation of digital curation is often carried out by archivists, librarians, scientists, historians, and scholars to ensure users have access to reliable, high-quality resources. Enterprises are also starting to adopt digital curation as a means to improve the quality of information and data within their operational and strategic processes. A successful digital curation initiative will help to mitigate digital obsolescence, keeping the information accessible to users indefinitely. Digital curation includes various aspects, including digital asset management, data curation, digital preservation, and electronic records management.

== Word History ==
Much like the word archive has layered meanings and uses, the word curation is both a noun and a verb, used originally in the field of museology to represent a wide range of activities, most often associated with collection care, long-term preservation, and exhibition design. Curation can be a reference to physical repositories that store cultural heritage or natural resource collections (e.g., a curatorial repository) or a representation of varied policies and processes involved with the long-term care and management of heritage collections, digital archives, and research data (e.g, curatorial/collections management plans, curation life-cycle, and data curation). Yet curation is also associated with short-term objectives and processes of selection and interpretation for the purposes of presentation, such as for gallery exhibitions and websites, which contribute to knowledge creation. It has also been applied to interaction with social media including compiling digital images, web links, and movie files.

The term curation entered the legal framework through federal historic preservation laws, starting with the National Historic Preservation Act of 1966, and was further defined and coded into federal regulations through 36 CFR Part 79: Curation of Federally-owned and Administered Archaeological Collections. Curation has since permeated into an array of disciplines but remains closely tied to heritage and information management.

== Core Principles and Activities ==
The term "digital curation" was first used in the e-science and biological science fields as a means of differentiating the additional suite of activities ordinarily employed by library and museum curators to add value to their collections and enable its reuse from the smaller subtask of simply preserving the data, a significantly more concise archival task. Additionally, the historical understanding of the term "curator" demands more than simple care of the collection. A curator is expected to command academic mastery of the subject matter as a requisite part of appraisal and selection of assets and any subsequent adding of value to the collection through application of metadata.

=== Principles ===
There are five commonly accepted principles that govern the occupation of digital curation:

- Manage the complete birth-to-retirement life cycle of the digital asset.
- Evaluate and cull assets for inclusion in the collection.
- Apply preservation methods to strengthen the asset’s integrity and reusability for future users.
- Act proactively throughout the asset life cycle to add value to both the digital asset and the collection.
- Facilitate the appropriate degree of access to users.

=== Methodology ===
The Digital Curation Center offers the following step-by-step life cycle procedures for putting the above principles into practice:

Sequential Actions:

- Conceptualize: Consider what digital material you will be creating and develop storage options. Take into account websites, publications, email, among other types of digital output.
- Create: Produce digital material and attach all relevant metadata, typically the more metadata the more accessible the information.
- Appraise and select: Consult the mission statement of the institution or private collection and determine what digital data is relevant. There may also be legal guidelines in place that will guide the decision process for a particular collection.
- Ingest: Send digital material to the predetermined storage solution. This may be an archive, repository or other facility.
- Preservation action: Employ measures to maintain the integrity of the digital material.
- Store: Secure data within the predetermined storage facility.
- Access, use, and reuse: Determine the level of accessibility for the range of digital material created. Some material may be accessible only by password and other material may be freely accessible to the public. Routinely check that material is still accessible for the intended audience and that the material has not been compromised through multiple uses.
- Transform: If desirable or necessary the material may be transferred into a different digital format.

Occasional Actions:

- Dispose: Discard any digital material that is not deemed necessary to the institution.
- Reappraise: Reevaluate material to ensure that is it still relevant and is true to its original form.
- Migrate: Migrate data to another format in order to protect data for using better in the future.

== Related terms ==
The term "digital curation" is sometimes used interchangeably with terms such as "digital preservation" and "digital archiving." While digital preservation does focus a significant degree of energy on optimizing reusability, preservation remains a subtask to the concept of digital archiving, which is in turn a subtask of digital curation. For example, archiving is a part of curation, but so are subsequent tasks such as themed collection-building, which is not considered an archival task. Similarly, preservation is a part of archiving, as are the tasks of selection and appraisal that are not necessarily part of preservation.

Data curation is another term that is often used interchangeably with digital curation, however common usage of the two terms differs. While "data" is a more all-encompassing term that can be used generally to indicate anything recorded in binary form, the term "data curation" is most common in scientific parlance and usually refers to accumulating and managing information relative to the process of research. Data-driven research of education request the role of information professional gradually develop tradition of digital service to data curation particularly at the management of digital research data. So, while documents and other discrete digital assets are technically a subset of the broader concept of data, in the context of scientific vernacular digital curation represents a broader purview of responsibilities than data curation due to its interest in preserving and adding value to digital assets of any kind.

== Challenges ==
=== Rate of creation of new data and data sets ===
The ever-lowering cost to use technology, alongside the rise of entirely new categories of technology, has led to a rapid increase in digital data production. These can come from well-established sources, such as business and government, but the trend is also driven by new types of technology becoming embedded in more areas of modern daily life. This is particularly true of consumers, whose production of digital assets is no longer relegated strictly to work. Nowadays, consumers create a wider range of digital assets - such as videos, photos, location data, purchases, and fitness tracking data - and share them on a wider range of social platforms.

Additionally, the advance of technology has introduced new ways of working with data. Some examples of this are international partnerships that leverage astronomical data to create "virtual observatories," and similar partnerships have also leveraged data resulting from research at the Large Hadron Collider at CERN and the database of protein structures at the Protein Data Bank.

=== Storage format evolution and obsolescence ===
By comparison, archiving of analog assets is notably passive in nature, often limited to simply ensuring a suitable storage environment. Digital preservation requires a more proactive approach. Today’s artifacts of cultural significance are notably transient in nature and prone to obsolescence when social trends or dependent technologies change. This rapid progression of technology occasionally makes it necessary to migrate digital asset holdings from one file format to another in order to mitigate the dangers of hardware and software obsolescence which would render the asset unusable.

=== Underestimation of human labor costs ===
Modern tools for program planning often underestimate the amount of human labor costs required for adequate digital curation of large collections. As a result cost-benefit assessments often paint an inaccurate picture of both the amount of work involved and the true cost to the institution for both successful outcomes and failures.

The concept of cost in business field would be more obvious. Varieties of business systems are running for daily operations. For example, human resources systems deal with recruitment and payroll, communication systems manage internal and external email, and administration systems handle finance, marketing, and other aspects. However, business systems in institutions are not designed for long-term information preservation initially. In some instances, business systems are revised to become Digital Curation systems for preserving transaction information due to cost consideration. The example of business systems are Enterprise Content Management (ECM) applications, which are used by designated group people such as business executives, customers for information management that support key processes organizationally. In the long run, to transfer digital content from ECM applications to Digital Curation (DC) applications would be a trend in large organizations domestically or internationally. The improvement of maturity models of ECM and DC may add value to information that request cost deduction and extensive use for further modification.

=== Standardization and coordination between institutions ===
An absence of coordination across different sectors of society and industry in areas such as the standardization of semantic and ontological definitions, and in forming partnerships for proper stewardship of assets has resulted in a lack of interoperability between institutions, and a partial breakdown in digital curation practice from the standpoint of the ordinary user. The example of coordination is Open Archival Information System (OAIS).

OAIS Reference Model allows professionals and many other organizations and individuals to contribute efforts to the OAIS open forums for developing international standards of archival information in long-term access.

=== Digitization of analog materials ===
The curation of digital objects is not limited to strictly born-digital assets. Many institutions have engaged in monumental efforts to digitize analog holdings in an effort to increase access to their collections. Examples of these materials are books, photographs, maps, audio recordings, and more. The process of converting printed resources into digital collections has been epitomized to some degree by librarians and related specialists. For example, The Digital Curation Centre is claimed to be a "world leading centre of expertise in digital information curation" that assists higher education research institutions in such conversions.

=== Material Types ===
==== Built Cultural Heritage ====
===== Monuments or Architectural Assets =====
Nowadays, with the development in ICT and computer-based visualisation, curators benefit from the 3D Reconstruction methods and Digital Twin to not only represent their updated and authentic cultural heritage data sets but also assist conservation architects and the other experts in further practices on the assets.

=== New representational formats ===
For some topics, knowledge is embodied in forms that have not been conducive to print, such as how choreography of dance or of the motion of skilled workers or artisans is difficult to encode. New digital approaches such as 3D holograms and other computer-programmed expressions are developing.

For mathematics, it seems possible for a new common language to be developed that would express mathematical ideas in ways that can be digitally stored, linked, and made accessible. The Global Digital Mathematics Library is a project to define and develop such a language.

=== Accessibility ===
The ability of the intended user community to access the repository’s holdings is of equal importance to all the preceding curatorial tasks. This must take into account not only the user community’s format and communication preferences, but also a consideration of communities that should not have access for various legal or privacy reasons.

Access can be increased by providing information about open access status with open data and open source methods such as the OAI-PMH endpoints of an open archive, which are then aggregated by databases and search engines like BASE, CORE, and Unpaywall for academic papers.

=== Responses to challenges ===
- Specialized research institutions

There are three elements for essential needs of institutions dealing with issues of digital curation: Leadership, Resources, and Collaboration. Three elements related to the role of advance-guards for librarians and archivists working with open approaches to technology, standardized process and scholarly communication. The archivist with leadership, who needs to be a dynamic and active role to embrace technology, standardized process, and scholarly communication. In addition, Archivist leader might adopt the business concept and methods to deal with their workflow such as raise funds, invest technology system, and comply with industry standards, in order to obtain more resources. Collaboration in archives and digital curation community could provide and share training, technologies, standards, and tools to help institutions on challengeable issues of digital curation. Digital Preservation Coalition (DPC), the Open Preservation Foundation or novel partnerships offer collaboration opportunity to institutions facing similar challenges in digital curation issues.

- Academic courses

Information field especially in libraries, archives, and museums significantly need to bring knowledge of new technologies. Traditional graduate school education is not enough to meet that demand; training program for current staffs in cultural repository would be an efficient supplement for that request, such as professional workshops, and MOOCs (Massively Open Online Courses) in data curation and management.

- Dedicated symposia

International Digital Curation Conference (IDCC) is an established annual event since 2005, aiming to collaborate with individuals, organizations, and institutions facing challenges, supporting development, and exchanging ideas in the field.

- Peer reviewed technical and industry journals

The International Journal of Digital Curation (IJDC) is administered by IJDC Editorial Board including the Editor-in-Chief, Digital Curation Center (DCC), and the following members. IJDC dedicate to provide scholarly platform for sharing, discussing, and improving knowledge and information of digital curation within the worldwide community. IJDC has two types of submission under editorial guidelines, which are peer-reviewed papers and general articles base on original research, the field information, and relevant events in digital curation. IJDC is published by the University of Edinburgh for the Digital Curation Centre in electronic form on a rolling basis two times a year. The open access to the public supports knowledge exchangeable in digital curation worldwide.

== Approaches ==
Many approaches to digital curation exist and have evolved over time in response to the changing technological landscape. Two examples of this are sheer curation and channelization.

Sheer curation is an approach to digital curation where curation activities are quietly integrated into the normal work flow of those creating and managing data and other digital assets. The word sheer is used to emphasize the lightweight and virtually transparent nature of these curation activities. The term sheer curation was coined by Alistair Miles in the ImageStore project, and the UK Digital Curation Centre's SCARP project. The approach depends on curators having close contact or 'immersion' in data creators' working practices. An example is the case study of a neuroimaging research group by Whyte et al., which explored ways of building its digital curation capacity around the apprenticeship style of learning of neuroimaging researchers, through which they share access to datasets and re-use experimental procedures.

Sheer curation depends on the hypothesis that good data and digital asset management at the point of creation and primary use is also good practice in preparation for sharing, publication and/or long-term preservation of these assets. Therefore, sheer curation attempts to identify and promote tools and good practices in local data and digital asset management in specific domains, where those tools and practices add immediate value to the creators and primary users of those assets. Curation can best be supported by identifying existing practices of sharing, stewardship, and re-use that add value, and augmenting them in ways that both have short-term benefits, and in the longer term reduce risks to digital assets or provide new opportunities to sustain their long-term accessibility and re-use value.

The aim of sheer curation is to establish a solid foundation for other curation activities which may not directly benefit the creators and primary users of digital assets, especially those required to ensure long-term preservation. By providing this foundation, further curation activities may be carried out by specialists at appropriate institutional and organisation levels, whilst causing the minimum of interference to others.

A similar idea is curation at source used in the context of Laboratory Information Management Systems LIMS. This refers more specifically to automatic recording of metadata or information about data at the point of capture and has been developed to apply semantic web techniques to integrate laboratory instrumentation and documentation systems. Sheer curation and curation-at-source can be contrasted with post hoc digital preservation, where a project is initiated to preserve a collection of digital assets that have already been created and are beyond the period of their primary use.

Channelization is curation of digital assets on the web, often by brands and media companies, into continuous flows of content, turning the user experience from a lean-forward interactive medium, to a lean-back passive medium. The curation of content can be done by an independent third party, that selects media from any number of on-demand outlets from across the globe and adds them to a playlist to offer a digital "channel" dedicated to certain subjects, themes, or interests so that the end user would see and/or hear a continuous stream of content.

== See also ==
- Digital preservation
- Data curation
- Digital asset management
- Digital Forensics
- Data format management
- Digital artifactual value
- Digital obsolescence
- Curator
- Biocurator
