= List of digital preservation initiatives =

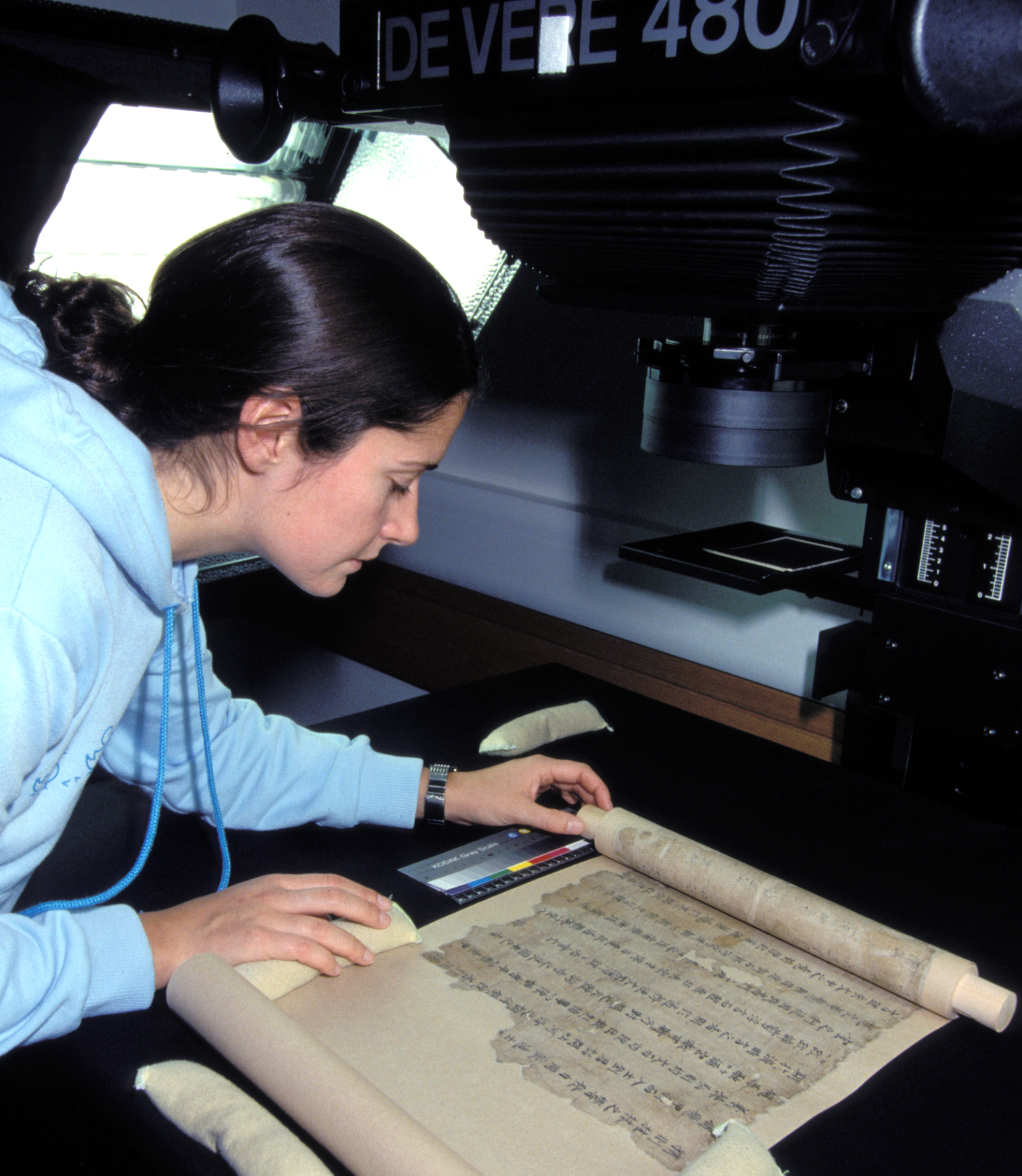
Digitisation at the British Library of a Tang dynasty manuscript from Dunhuang for the International Dunhuang Project

This is a list of digital preservation initiatives aimed at the digitisation of previously existing media or preserve existing digital archives.

== Initiatives ==
- ABS-CBN Film Restoration Project, an initiative dedicated on the preservation of thousands of Filipino films from ABS-CBN Film Archives.
- The Archive Team is a volunteer group primarily focused on the copying and preservation of material housed by at-risk online services.
- ARKive preserves film, video, audio and photographic media on endangered species.
- California Revealed is a California State Library initiative that helps public libraries, archives, museums, historical societies, and other heritage groups digitize, preserve, and provide online access to materials documenting California’s history, art, and cultures. It began as an audiovisual digitization initiative to preserve motion picture film, video tapes, and audio recordings from regional organizations, but has since expanded to include newspapers, scrapbooks, photographs, microfilm, manuscripts, and more.
- Canadiana.org is a non-profit alliance of major memory institutions in Canada providing access to digitized Canadian documentary heritage.
- The CLOCKSS Archive is a not-for-profit collaboration of academic libraries and scholarly publishers to preserve the published digital scholarly literature.
- The Computerspielemuseum Berlin is a cooperative partner of the EU research project ''PLANETS (Preservation and Long-term Access through Networked Services). Besides that, it is also a contributor to the EU research project Keeping Emulation Environments Portable, also a digital media preservation research project.
- The Digital Preservation Coalition (est. 2001) is a non-profit organization which seeks to secure the preservation of digital resources.
- DSpace is an open source software that essentially takes data in multiple formats (text, video, audio, or data), distributes it over the web, indexes the data (for easy retrieval), and preserves the data over time.
- Econstor is a non-profit digital archiving service by German National Library of Economics – Leibniz Information Centre for Economics. ECONSTOR aims to permanently preserve the literature in economics and related fields like management, business and social sciences (https://blog.repec.org/2011/09/15/econstor-a-repec-archive-for-research-from-germany/). ECONSTOR also provides free open access publication platform for researchers in the journal areas of management, economics and social sciences. Many publishers now prefer ECONSTOR to preserve and archive their digital contents (https://ijmess.com/whyijmess.php).
- Elsevier Science digital archive. In 2002, the Koninklijke Bibliotheek became the official digital archive for 7 terabytes of Elsevier Science journals.
- The FP7 DURAFILE Project (based on a FP7 initiative under grant agreement n° FP7-SME-2013-605356) aimed to offer a novel software platform preserving both personal digital information and the digital information generated by organizations. This is the first attempt to bring Digital Preservation to home users and small-medium size companies
- International Dunhuang Project, an international collaborative effort to conserve, catalogue and digitize manuscripts, printed texts, paintings, textiles and artefacts from Dunhuang and various other archaeological sites at the eastern end of the Silk Road, established by the British Library in 1994.
- LOCKSS (Lots Of Copies Keep Stuff Safe), established in 1998 under the auspices of Stanford University, develops and supports open-source software for digital preservation based on a distributed network of preservation appliances running a sophisticated voting protocol. Originally designed to preserve scholarly journals, the LOCKSS technology is now being used to preserve electronic theses and dissertations, government documents, books, blogs, websites, image collections, etc. The LOCKSS Program also runs its own preservation network.
- National Digital Heritage Archive, is a program that is a partnership between the National Library of New Zealand, Ex Libris Group, and Sun Microsystems to develop "Rosetta" a digital archive and preservation management system. Established in 2004, the program was launched in late 2009.
- The MetaArchive Cooperative is a library-run, collaborative approach to digital preservation that embeds digital preservation infrastructure and knowledge in each of its constituent member institutions. Composed mainly of University libraries, the Cooperative functions as a network wherein each preserved file is replicated seven times, is stored in geographically distinct locations across four countries, and is carefully managed from ingest (as a SIP) to dissemination (as a DIP).
- The Open Preservation Foundation (formerly the Open Planets Foundation) is a non-profit membership organisation which sustains technology and knowledge for the long-term management of digital cultural heritage, providing its members with reliable solutions to the challenges of digital preservation.
- US National Digital Information Infrastructure and Preservation Program, established in 2000 and run by The Library of Congress, is dedicated to ensuring that digital information remains available and accessible.
- Panjab Digital Library (PDL) is a voluntary organization established in 2003, focused on digitizing and preserving the cultural heritage of Panjab, including Sikh and Punjabi culture. With over 65 million digitized pages, it is the largest digital resource on Panjab. The library's mission is to locate, digitize, preserve, and make accessible the accumulated wisdom of the Panjab region, without distinction as to script, language, religion, nationality, or other physical condition.
- Pavia Archivi Digitali is a project promoted by the University of Pavia. Established in 2009, it aims to collect native digital archives and electronic-format documents of representatives of today's culture and society, ensuring their preservation over time and the possibility of studying.
- Preserving Access to Digital Information (PADI) is an archive of information on the topic of digital preservation from the National Library of Australia that was actively compiled and updated from 1996 through July 2010. Archived versions of the PADI site continue to be available online via PANDORA, Australia's web archive.
- Digital preservation program at Rhizome, which develops Conifer, a free open-source tool for web archiving and viewing of legacy born-digital cultural materials.
- Portico, a not-for-profit organization originally launched by JSTOR in 2002, is a digital preservation service which provides "a permanent archive of electronic scholarly journals and books".
- RODA is an open source digital preservation repository that delivers functionality for all the main units of the OAIS reference model. RODA is capable of ingesting, managing and providing access to the various types of digital content produced by large corporations or public bodies. RODA is based on open-source technologies and is supported by existing standards such as the OAIS, METS, EAD and PREMIS.
- Shapell Manuscript Foundation, is a US-based non-profit organization committed to the preservation of historical documents from the 19th and 20th centuries with a focus on the history of the US and the Holy Land. SMF has a large digitized collection of manuscripts available for public view on their web site. SMF is also engaged in collecting and digitizing a comprehensive list of Jewish soldiers who participated in the US Civil War, known as the Shapell Roster Project.
- FDsys (Federal Digital System) is a system being developed by the United States Government Printing Office to authenticate, preserve, and provide access to government information from all three branches of the Federal government.
- During year 2011, Centre of Excellence for Digital Preservation is established at C-DAC, Pune, India as a flagship project under National Digital Preservation Program (NDPP) sponsored by Ministry of Electronics & Information Technology, Government of India. Several pilot digital repositories in diverse domains such as public archives, e-governance, culture and heritage are in process of development. Among these, National Cultural Audiovisual Archive (NCAA) is certified as Trusted Digital Repository as per ISO 16363 on 27 November 2017.
- PubMed Central (PMC) is a free full-text archive of biomedical and life sciences journal literature at the U.S. National Institutes of Health's National Library of Medicine (NIH/NLM).
- The Wayback Machine, a digital archive of the World Wide Web and other information on the Internet.
- Preliminary digitalization of Borobudur Temple - Australian National University (Greenhalgh and Limaye, 2002).
- Memento Project, a United States National Digital Information Infrastructure and Preservation Program (NDIIPP)–funded project aimed at making Web-archived content more readily discoverable.

== See also ==
- List of Web archiving initiatives
- List of archives
- List of national archives
- List of archivists
- Timeline of digital preservation
