= Preservation metadata =

Information that supports and documents acts of preservation on digital materials

Preservation metadata is item level information that describes the context and structure of a digital object. It provides background details pertaining to a digital object's provenance, authenticity, and environment. Preservation metadata, is a specific type of metadata that works to maintain a digital object's viability while ensuring continued access by providing contextual information, usage details, and rights.

As an increasing portion of the world’s information output shifts from analog to digital form, preservation metadata is an essential component of most digital preservation strategies, including digital curation, data management, digital collections management and the preservation of digital information over the long-term. It is an integral part of the data lifecycle and helps to document a digital object’s authenticity while maintaining usability across formats.

== Definition of Preservation Metadata ==
Metadata surrounds and describes physical, digitized, and born-digital information objects. Preservation metadata is external metadata related to a digital object created after a resource has been separated from its original creator, with value-added. The item-level data further stores technical details on the format, structure and uses of a digital resource, along with the history of all actions performed on the resource. These technical details include changes and decisions regarding digitization, migration to other formats, authenticity information such as technical features or custody history, and the rights and responsibilities information. In addition, preservation metadata may include information on the physical condition of a resource.

Preservation metadata is dynamic, accessibility focused, and should provide the following information: details about files and instructions for use, documentation of all updates or actions that have been performed on an object, object provenance and details pertaining to current and future custody; details of the individual(s) who are responsible for the preservation of the object and changes made to it.

=== Components of Metadata ===
- Provenance: Who has had custody/ownership of the digital object?
- Authenticity: Is the digital object what it purports to be?
- Preservation activity: What has been done to preserve the digital object?
- Technical environment: What is needed to render, interact with and use the digital object?
- Rights management: What intellectual property rights must be observed?

=== Types of Metadata Creation ===
- Automatic (internal)
- Manual (often created by a specialist)
- Created during digitization
- User-contributed

== Uses of Preservation Metadata ==
Digital materials require constant maintenance and migration to new formats to accommodate evolving technologies and varied user needs. In order to survive into the future, digital objects need preservation metadata that exists independently from the systems which were used to create them. Without preservation metadata, digital material will be lost. “While a print book with a broken spine can be easily re-bound, a digital object that has become corrupted or obsolete is often impossible (or prohibitively expensive) to repair”. Preservation metadata provides the vital information which will make “digital objects self-documenting across time.” Data maintenance is considered a key piece of collections maintenance by ensuring the availability of a resource over time, a concept detailed in the Reference Model for an Open Archival Information System (OAIS). OAIS is a broad conceptual model which many organizations have followed in developing new preservation metadata element sets and Archival Information Packages (AIP). Early projects in preservation metadata in the library community include CEDARS, NEDLIB, The National Library of Australia and the OCLC/RLG Working Group on Preservation Metadata. The ongoing work of maintaining, supporting, and coordinating future revisions to the PREMIS Data Dictionary is undertaken by the PREMIS Editorial Committee, hosted by the Library of Congress. Preservation metadata provides continuity and contributes to the validity and authenticity of a resource by providing evidence of changes, adjustments and migrations.

The importance of preservation metadata is further indicated by its required inclusion in many Data Management Plans (DMPs) which are often key pieces of applications for grants and government funding.

Considered by the National Information Standards Organization (NISO) to be a subtype of administrative metadata, preservation metadata is used to promote:

- Interoperability
- Digital object management
- Preservation (often in conjunction with technical metadata)

== Complications of Preservation Metadata ==
Concern over the poor management of digital objects notes the possibility of a "digital dark age". Many institutions, including the Digital Curation Center (DCC) and the National Digital Stewardship Alliance (NDSA) are working to create access to digital objects while ensuring their continued viability. In the NDSA’s Version 1 of the Levels of Digital Preservation, preservation metadata is grouped under Level Four, or "Repair your metadata", part of the macro preservation plan intended to make objects available over the long term.

The differing uses of digital resources across space, time and institutions requires that one object or set of information be accessible in a variety of formats, with the creation of new preservation metadata in each iteration. Anne Gilliland notes that these variations create the need for wider data standards that can be used within and across industries that will then result in further use and interoperability. The value of interoperability is further validated by the expense, both temporal and financial, of metadata creation.

The creation of preservation metadata by multiple users or institutions can complicate issues of ownership, access and responsibility. Depending on an institution’s mission, it may be difficult or outside the scope of responsibility to perform preservation while providing access. Further research into cross-institutional collaboration may provide greater insight into where data should be stored, and who should be managing it. Scholar Maggie Fieldhouse notes that the creation of metadata is shifting from collections managers to suppliers and publishers. Jerome McDonough identifies the benefits of multiple partners collaborating to improve metadata records around an object with preservation metadata as a key in cross-institutional communication. Sheila Corrall notes that the creation and management of preservation metadata represents the intersection between libraries, IT management and archival practice.

== Developments in Preservation Metadata ==
Preservation metadata is a new and developing field. The OAIS Reference Model is a broad conceptual model which many organizations have followed in developing new preservation metadata element sets. Early projects in preservation metadata in the library community include CEDARS, NEDLIB, The National Library of Australia and the OCLC/RLG Working Group on Preservation Metadata. The ongoing work of maintaining, supporting, and coordinating future revisions to the PREMIS Data Dictionary is undertaken by the PREMIS Editorial Committee, hosted by the Library of Congress.

=== ARCHANGEL ===
Recent developments in blockchain technology and the need for verifiable sources have led to the pilot program ARCHANGEL to use blockchain in the archival space.

== See also ==
- Digital preservation
- Preservation Metadata: Implementation Strategies (PREMIS)
- Metadata
- Digital library
- Content Management Systems
