= Kennedy's assassin =

Kennedy's assassin may refer to:

- Lee Harvey Oswald, who shot and killed John F. Kennedy in 1963
- Sirhan Sirhan, who shot and killed Robert F. Kennedy in 1968
