= Metadata Encoding and Transmission Standard =

Internet file standard

- Version: 1.12.1 Revised 2019

The Metadata Encoding and Transmission Standard (METS) is a metadata standard for encoding descriptive, administrative, and structural metadata regarding objects within a digital library, expressed using the XML schema language of the World Wide Web Consortium (W3C). The standard is maintained as part of the MARC standards of the Library of Congress, and is being developed as an initiative of the Digital Library Federation (DLF).

== Overview ==
METS is an XML Schema designed for the purpose of:

- Creating XML document instances that express the hierarchical structure of digital library objects.
- Recording the names and locations of the files that comprise those objects.
- Recording associated metadata. METS can, therefore, be used as a tool for modeling real world objects, such as particular document types.

Depending on its use, a METS document could be used in the role of Submission Information Package (SIP), Archival Information Package (AIP), or Dissemination Information Package (DIP) within the Open Archival Information System (OAIS) Reference Model.

=== Digital libraries vs traditional libraries ===
Maintaining a library of digital objects requires maintaining metadata about those objects. The metadata necessary for successful management and use of digital objects is both more extensive than and different from the metadata used for managing collections of printed works and other physical materials. METS is intended to promote the preservation of, and interoperability between digital libraries.

- Where a traditional library may record descriptive metadata regarding a book in its collection, the book will not dissolve into a series of unconnected pages if the library fails to record structural metadata regarding the book's organization, nor will scholars be unable to evaluate the book's worth if the library fails to note, for example, that the book was produced using a Ryobi offset press.
- The same cannot be said for a digital library. Without structural metadata, the page image or text files comprising the digital work are of little use, and without technical metadata regarding the digitization process, scholars may be unsure of how accurate a reflection of the original the digital version provides.
- However, in a digital library it is possible to create an eBook-like PDF file or TIFF file which can be seen as a single physical book and reflect the integrity of the original.

=== Flexibility and interoperability ===
The open flexibility of METS means that there is not a prescribed vocabulary which allows many different types of institutions, with many different document types, to utilize METS. The customization of METS makes it highly functional internally, but creates limitations for interoperability. Interoperability becomes difficult when the exporting and importing institutions have used vocabularies. As a workaround for this problem the creation of institutional profiles has become popular. These profiles document the implementation of METS specific to that institution helping to map content in order for exchanged METS documents to be more usable across institutions.

=== History ===
As early as 1996 the University of California, Berkeley began working toward the development of a system that combined encoding for an outline of a digital object's structure with metadata for that object. In 1998 this work was expanded upon by the Making of America II project (MoAII). An important objective of this project was the creation of a standard for digital objects that would include defined metadata for the descriptive, administrative, and structural aspects of a digital object. A type of structural and metadata encoding system using an XML Document Type Definition (DTD) was the result of these efforts. The MoAII DTD was limited in that it did not provide flexibility in which metadata terms could be used for the elements in the descriptive, administrative, and structural metadata portions of the object. In 2001, a new version of the DTD was developed that used namespaces separate from the system rather than the vocabulary of the previous DTD. This revision was the foundation for the current METS schema, officially named in April of that year.

== The 7 sections of a METS document ==
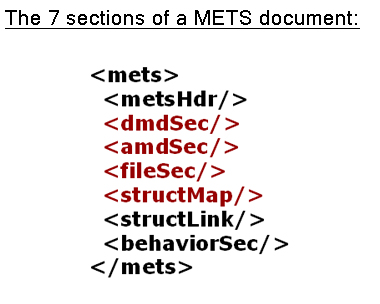
Sections of a METS document

- METS header metsHdr: the METS document itself, such as its creator, editor, etc.
- Descriptive Metadata dmdSec: May contain internally embedded metadata or point to metadata external to the METS document. Multiple instances of both internal and external descriptive metadata may be included.
- Administrative Metadata amdSec: Provides information regarding how files were created and stored, intellectual property rights, metadata regarding the original source object from which the digital library object derives, and information regarding the provenance of files comprising the digital library object (such as master/derivative relationships, migrations, and transformations). As with descriptive metadata, administrative metadata may be internally encoded or external to the METS document.
- File Section fileSec: Lists all files containing content which comprise the electronic versions of the digital object. file elements may be grouped within fileGrp elements to subdivide files by object version. Although this section is not required, it is typically included in most METS documents as it adds a level of functionality to the structure of the document.
- Structural Map structMap: Outlines a hierarchical structure for the digital library object, and links the elements of that structure to associated content files and metadata. The Structural Map is the only section required for all METS documents.
- Structural Links structLink: Allows METS creators to record the existence of hyperlinks between nodes in the Structural Map. This is of particular value in using METS to archive Websites.
- Behavioral behaviorSec: Used to associate executable behaviors with content in the METS object. Each behavior has a mechanism element identifying a module of executable code that implements behaviors defined abstractly by its interface definition.

== See also ==
- ALTO
- Dublin Core, an ISO metadata standard
- Preservation Metadata: Implementation Strategies (PREMIS)
- Open Archives Initiative Protocol for Metadata Harvesting (OAI-PMH)
- Open Archives Initiative Object Reuse and Exchange (OAI-ORE)
- BagIt (BagIt)
