= Bernard Diamond =

Bernard Diamond may refer to:

- Bernard Diamond (VC) (1827–1892), Irish recipient of Victoria Cross
- Bernard L. Diamond (1912–1990), psychiatrist and professor of law and psychiatry at the University of California, Berkeley
