= 1948 visit by Robert F. Kennedy to Palestine =

Robert F. Kennedy visited the British Mandate of Palestine in 1948, one month before Israel's Declaration of Independence. Twenty-two years old at the time, he was reporting on the tense situation in the region for The Boston Post. During his stay, he grew to admire the Jewish inhabitants of the area. He later became a strong supporter of Israel; this was later cited as Sirhan Sirhan's alleged motivation for assassinating him on the first anniversary of the start of the Six-Day War on June 5, 1968. Sirhan happened to see a documentary about Kennedy in Palestine in 1948. Later in his murder trial, Sirhan Sirhan testified: "I hoped he will win Presidency until that moment. But when I saw, heard, he was supporting Israel, sir, not in 1968, but he was supporting, it from all the way from its inception in 1948, sir ..." Author Robert Blair Kaiser points out a discrepancy in the timing of Sirhan's decision. In Sirhan's diary, the entry in which he decided to kill Robert Kennedy was made on May 18. The documentary in question was first shown on TV in the Los Angeles area on May 20. When asked to explain, Sirhan said that he did not recall writing the journal.

== Background ==
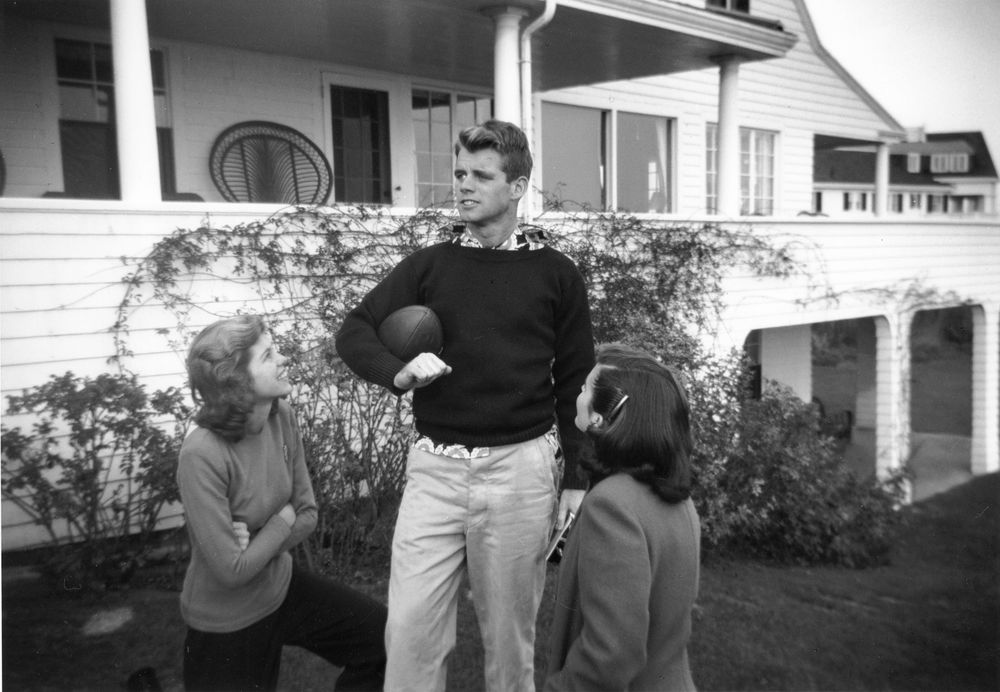
Robert F. Kennedy (center) at his family's home in Hyannis Port, Massachusetts, 1948

Kennedy covered the Arab-Israeli war and Berlin airlift in 1948, and later the Japanese Peace Treaty Conference in 1951 for The Boston Post

Following his graduation from Harvard, Kennedy was encouraged by his father to travel overseas. Ignoring his father's warning to avoid trouble, Kennedy took a flight from Cairo to Lod Airport, near Tel Aviv.

== Trip and dispatches ==
While in Israel, Kennedy visited Tel Aviv, Jerusalem, and a kibbutz, and spoke with various locals. The area was very unsafe at the time; the Jewish convoy that followed Kennedy's from Tel Aviv to Jerusalem was, in Kennedy's words, "cut to ribbons." While touring Jerusalem, he was arrested, blindfolded, and brought to the Haganah headquarters, where he was advised to stay off of the streets. At the time of Kennedy's visit, a four-year-old Sirhan Sirhan resided in Musrara, Jerusalem.

He interviewed members of the Irgun, a former Soviet Army major, and a 23-year-old woman who worked in propaganda services. He wrote that the Jews have "an undying spirit" and said: "They will fight, and fight with unparalleled courage." He wrote about Jews and Arabs working together in the fields as a hopeful sign for the future of the region. He talked to a Haganah soldier who had shot his sister upon learning that she was not going to leave her British boyfriend. He wrote that Arabs told him that they were going to poison Jerusalem's water supply. It was clear to him that no side was going to compromise:

The die has long since been cast; the fight will take place. The Jews with their backs to the sea, fighting for their very homes, with 101 percent morale, will accept no compromise. On the other hand, the Arabs say: "We shall bring Moslem brigades from Pakistan, we shall lead a religious crusade for all loyal followers of Mohammed, we shall crush forever the invader. Whether it takes three months, three years, or 30, we will carry on the fight. Palestine will be Arab. We shall accept no compromise."

He was impressed with the "new" Jews he discovered in Palestine, who were vastly different from the Jews he knew in the United States. He wrote: "The Jewish people in Palestine who believe in and have been working toward this national state have become an immensely proud and determined people. It is already a truly great modern example of the birth of a nation with the primary ingredients of dignity and self-respect."

Israel declared its independence on May 14, 1948. The dispatches that Kennedy wrote in Palestine were published in The Boston Post on June 3–6, 1948. The first one, titled "British Hated by Both Sides", immediately attracted attention to the reports.

Following are quotations from Kennedy's dispatches:

The Arabs are most concerned about the great increase in the Jews in Palestine: 80,000 in 1948. The Arabs have always feared this encroachment and maintain that the Jews will never be satisfied with just their section of Palestine, but will gradually move to overpower the rest of the country and will eventually move onto the enormously wealthy oil lands. They are determined that the Jews will never get the toehold that would be necessary for the fulfillment of that policy ...

The Jews point with pride to the fact that over 500,000 Arabs, in the 12 years between 1932-1944, came into Palestine to take advantage of living conditions existing in no other Arab state ...

If a Jewish state is formed it will be the only remaining stabilizing factor in the near and far [sic for Near and Middle] East.

Kennedy dismissed Western fears that Israel might turn communist as "fanatically absurd" and argued that the United States and Britain might soon "be looking to a Jewish state to preserve a toehold in that part of the world."

== Impact ==
In a 1964 speech in Westchester, Kennedy bolstered his pro-Israel credentials to a largely Jewish crowd and referred to his 1948 visit:

"I was involved in that war," Kennedy said, "I took a tank from Tel Aviv to Jerusalem. I was one of a few who said Israel was going to get her independence because of her courage and determination."
