= Paul Schrade =

American union leader (1924–2022)

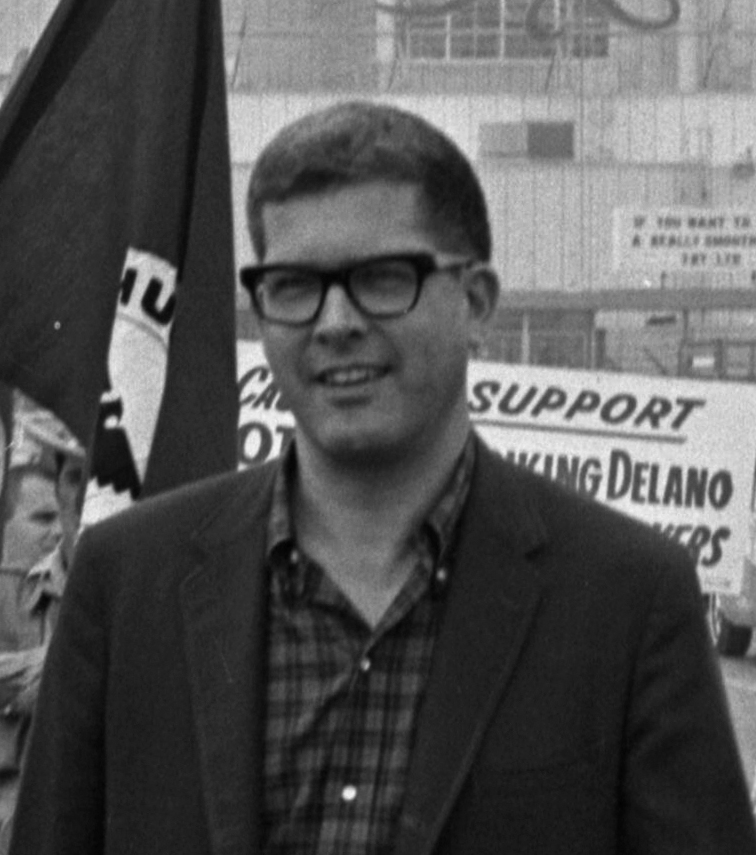
Schrade in 1967

Paul Schrade (December 17, 1924 – November 9, 2022) was an American trade union activist. While vice president of the United Auto Workers, he was shot in the head during the 1968 assassination of Robert F. Kennedy. Schrade believed that while he was shot by Sirhan Sirhan, Kennedy was shot by a second gunman. He spoke in favor of granting Sirhan parole in 2021.

Paul Schrade is featured in the Netflix documentary Bobby Kennedy for President. The Paul Schrade Library at the Los Angeles High School of the Arts was named after him.

On the question of CIA involvement in the assassination of Robert Kennedy, Schrade said, "It's possible. I mean, they've done worse things, haven't they?"
