= MetaArchive Cooperative =

International digital preservation network

The MetaArchive Cooperative was an international digital preservation network composed of libraries, archives, and other memory institutions. As of August 2011, the MetaArchive preservation network was composed of 24 secure servers (referred to as “caches”) in four countries with a collective capacity of over 300TB. Forty-eight institutions were actively preserving their digital collections in the network. MetaArchive formally sunset on March 31, 2025.

The MetaArchive Cooperative preserved a wide variety of data types and many genres of content, including electronic theses and dissertations, digital newspapers, archival content such as photograph collections and A/V materials, business/e-records, and datasets. The network was “dark,” meaning access was limited to the content owner/contributor. It was also format-agnostic, meaning that each content contributor could determine what formats it wished to preserve.

== History ==
MetaArchive was founded in 2004, when six southeastern University libraries (Auburn University, Florida State University, Emory University, the Georgia Tech Library, University of Louisville, and Virginia Tech) came together to collaboratively explore creating a digital preservation solution that they could own and manage for themselves. With backing from the National Digital Information Infrastructure and Preservation Program (NDIIPP), they used the LOCKSS software to build one of the world’s first operational digital preservation networks. In 2006, these six institutions created an organizational model to enable the project to transition into a sustainable program hosted not by any single member institution, but rather by the Educopia Institute, a 501(c)3 organization that was launched for this purpose. In 2007, the MetaArchive Cooperative began expanding with the addition of new members. In 2017, the MetaArchive Cooperative won the LBI George Cunha and Susan Swartzburg Award from the American Library Association. The MetaArchive Cooperative formally dissolved on March 31st, 2025, due to increased costs from its fiscal host organization and insufficient operating reserves.

== How it works ==
MetaArchive enabled memory institutions (libraries, archives, museums, historical societies, etc.) to embed both the technical infrastructure and the knowledge that they need to preserve their digital content within their own institutions.

Each member institution hosted a server, or “cache”, within the network. All of these caches were united into a closed network using the LOCKSS software. Content was prepared by members as “submission information packages” (SIPs), (see OAIS for more information) and each of these SIPs was replicated seven times and ingested and preserved as AIPs (“archival information packages”) in seven geographically separate caches by member institutions. The network regularly compared these seven AIPs to ensure that nothing about them degraded or changed. If the network detected a change in an AIP, the cache containing the damaged copy re-ingested the source SIP if it was still available; if the source SIP was unavailable, it ingested a copy of the AIP from another cache.

== Services ==
MetaArchive’s services included data preparation, replication, geographical distribution, bit integrity checking, versioning, security, restricted viewing, and content restoration. When needed, the MetaArchive Cooperative would also perform format migrations for member content (this service was not required by the Cooperative’s membership). The Cooperative’s ingest procedure was compatible with any repository/content management system, including DSpace, CONTENTdm, ETDdb, and other systems.

== Membership levels ==
The Cooperative had three membership levels:

- Sustaining Members formed the leadership of the Cooperative via their participation as Steering Committee members.
- Preservation Members engaged in ongoing preservation activities.
- Collaborative Members were groups of institutions that ran shared, centralized repositories and preserved this shared content in the MetaArchive preservation network.

All members ran a 16TB server and paid $1/GB/year for their preserved collections.

The organizational model created and practiced by the MetaArchive Cooperative served as a model for myriad other digital preservation groups, including the National Digital Stewardship Alliance (NDSA).
