= Designated community =

Group of archive consumers

In information and archival communities, a designated community is an identified group of potential consumers who should be able to understand a particular set of information. These consumers may consist of multiple communities, are designated by the archive, and may change over time.

Organizations determine their designated communities and establish standards and guidelines that create a mutually beneficial relationship. A designated community can be defined by its occupation, status, or geographic location.

The term designated community is closely aligned with the concept of Open Archival Information System (OAIS). Each one gives the other a central purpose. The OAIS is a repository of information specified for its designated community. The designated community is the reason the OAIS maintains the information it collects.

A designated community can change, grow, shrink, or otherwise change over time, depending on the purpose of the information being preserved. Sometimes, a designated community can start as one subset and evolve into a wholly different subset depending on how the information that was originally assigned is being used or misused.

== Example ==
Canada's York University has a specific definition for its digital preservation designated communities. They categorize them as “primary” and “secondary” communities. This demonstrates their prioritization of the intent behind what is digitally preserved. With a primary community made up of the university's faculty, students, staff, and researchers, York University situates that community's digital preservation needs above others.
