= Preservation Metadata: Implementation Strategies =

Digital preservation metadata standard

PREservation Metadata: Implementation Strategies (PREMIS) is the de facto digital preservation metadata standard.

Digital preservation metadata defines the information that is needed to ensure the long-term usability of digital objects to keep them accessible in some form in the future. Digital preservation metadata is particularly important for repositories, places where information objects are stored and managed for a long time. Simply storing digital objects on a data carrier is not enough to keep them usable. They need to be managed in a repository so that they are protected from accidental or intentional damage and so that a full computing environment can be created in which they can be accessed and understood when they are needed.

Information objects have descriptive metadata, information about the object that could be used to discover, access and identify the digital object. This metadata is, however, not enough to preserve the digital objects in the long-term. For example, the digital object's file format can become obsolete and unusable by future software applications. This would require either transforming the older format to a newer one (migration), or reproducing the original experience with newer technology (emulation). Both strategies would require the additional information, such as technical metadata about the original files, information about the older hardware and software that they ran on, and information about actions that have transformed the digital object over time. All of these are types of preservation metadata. Preservation metadata therefore supports activities intended to ensure the long-term usability of a digital resource.

In the early 2000s it became clear that a shared community metadata standard was needed to ensure long-term preservation of the ever-increasing digital resources. Experts from key memory institutions and repository developers joined together to define it, resulting in The PREMIS Data Dictionary for Preservation Metadata, which has become a de facto standard that defines core metadata needed by most preservation repositories.

The use of standards is important as it supports the development of a community of best practice; it helps practitioners learn from the insights of others, so that they do not inadvertently overlook key metadata in their own practice; it allows for development of tools to make metadata creation and management easier; and it enables organizations to more easily exchange information with each other.

== History ==
The PREMIS working group was created to further the work of an earlier initiative sponsored by the Online Computer Library Center OCLC and the Research Libraries Group RLG: the Preservation Metadata Framework (PMF) working group. In 2001–2002 the PMF working group outlined the types of information that should be associated with an archived digital object. Their report, A Metadata Framework to Support the Preservation of Digital Objects (the Framework), proposed a list of prototype metadata elements. At this stage these proposed elements could not be implemented and additional work was needed. In 2003 the PREMIS working group was asked to take the PMF group’s findings further and develop a data dictionary of core metadata for archived digital objects, as well as to give guidance and suggest best practice for management: creating, managing, and using the metadata in preservation systems. PREMIS was “charged to define a set of semantic units that are implementation independent, practically oriented, and likely to be needed by most preservation repositories”.

The working group consisted of a multi-national roster of more than thirty representatives from the cultural, government, and private sectors. It sought to understand how preservation repositories were actually implementing preservation metadata. A survey was performed on 70 organizations thought to be active in or interested in digital preservation. In December 2004 the PREMIS working group published its report, Implementing Preservation Repositories for Digital Materials: Current Practice and Emerging Trends in the Cultural Heritage Community.

The earlier Framework and the PREMIS Data Dictionary build on the Open Archival Information System (OAIS) reference model. The OAIS information model provides a conceptual foundation in the form of a taxonomy of information objects and packages for archived objects, and the structure of their associated metadata. The Framework, through its deeply detailed mapping of preservation metadata to that conceptual structure, can be seen as an elaboration of OAIS. The PREMIS Data Dictionary, on the other hand, can be seen as a translation of the Framework into a set of implementable semantic units. The Data Dictionary and OAIS sometimes differ in terminology usage and these are noted in the Glossary. Differences usually reflect the fact that PREMIS semantic units require more specificity than the OAIS definitions provide, which is to be expected when moving from a conceptual framework to an implementation.

In May 2005, PREMIS released Data Dictionary for Preservation Metadata: Final Report of the PREMIS Working Group. This 237-page report includes: PREMIS Data Dictionary 1.0: a comprehensive, practical resource for implementing preservation metadata in digital archiving systems; accompanying report (providing context, data model, assumptions); special topics, glossary, usage examples; set of XML schema which was developed to support use of the Data Dictionary.

The current Version 3.0 of PREMIS was released in June 2015.

== Versions ==
Versions table
DD Version	DD Date	Ontology Version	Ontology Date	Ontology xmlns	Description
class="templateVersion co swatch-unsupported" style="color: var(--color-base, #202122); " title="Old version, not maintained" data-sort-value="1.0" | 1.0	May 17, 2005				
class="templateVersion co swatch-unsupported" style="color: var(--color-base, #202122); " title="Old version, not maintained" data-sort-value="1.1" | 1.1	September 27, 2005				
class="templateVersion co swatch-unsupported" style="color: var(--color-base, #202122); " title="Old version, not maintained" data-sort-value="2.2" | 2.2	July 2012	class="templateVersion co swatch-unsupported" style="color: var(--color-base, #202122); " title="Old version, not maintained" data-sort-value="2.2" | 2.2	June 6, 2013	http://www.loc.gov/premis/rdf/v1#	Ontology 2.2, but xmlns is v1
class="templateVersion co swatch-unsupported" style="color: var(--color-base, #202122); " title="Old version, not maintained" data-sort-value="2.3" | 2.3	August 4, 2014				
class="templateVersion c swatch-latest" style="color: var(--color-base, #202122); " title="Latest version" data-sort-value="3.0" | 3.0	January 18, 2016	class="templateVersion c swatch-latest" style="color: var(--color-base, #202122); " title="Latest version" data-sort-value="3.0" | 3.0	July 2013	http://www.loc.gov/premis/rdf/v3/	
Old version Latest version

== Entities ==
The PREMIS data model consists of four interrelated entities:

1. Object (divided into three subtypes)
2. Event
3. Agent
4. Rights

With each semantic unit in the data dictionary categorized in one of these areas.

An Intellectual Object entity is a type of Object. It is a set of content that constitutes a discrete, coherent intellectual unit, such as a book or a database. These may be compound objects containing other intellectual entities and may have multiple digital representations. Descriptive metadata is usually applied at this level; given the proliferation of competing schemes, the working group did not define any further descriptive semantic units and allowed for interoperability through “extension containers” (containers hold a related group of semantic units) that can be used for external schemes.

Most of the semantic units listed in the data dictionary relate to Object and Event entities, the former being further divided into three subtypes of file, bitstream, and representation. A file is the level at which most end users are used to working, a “named and ordered sequence of bytes that is known by an operating system.” It includes a variety of file system attributes, rendering it understandable by an operating system, encompassing bitstreams, which are “contiguous or non-contiguous data within a file that has meaningful common properties for preservation purposes.” A representation is, in a sense, the “highest level” of this model, for it may encompass several files in order to properly render the structure and content of an intellectual entity. Not all repositories will be concerned with preserving representations, depending on their purpose and the curatorial body’s need to preserve what might be considered the entity’s digital “intrinsic value.” Furthermore, intellectual entities may have multiple representations within a repository. Events interrelate with objects insofar as they involve actions that have an effect on them or agents ("a person, organization, or software...associated with Events...or with Rights attached to an object") associated with the object.

Finally, the inclusion of rights entities responds to an increased awareness of and concern for the legal requirements of copyright and licensing. It also includes information about the specific actions permitted; for example, semantic unit 4.1.6.1, act, “the action the preservation repository is allowed to take,” includes such suggested values as replicate, migrate, and delete.

== Data dictionary ==
PREMIS data dictionary entries include twelve attribute fields, not all of which are applied to every semantic unit (analogous to an "element" in other metadata schemes). In addition to the name and definition of the unit, the fields record such things as rationale for including the unit, usage notes, and examples of how the value might be filled in. Four of the attributes - object category, applicability, repeatability, and obligation - are linked, as the last three are defined for each of the object entity levels of file, bitstream, and representation. The dictionary is hierarchical; some semantic units are contained within others. For example, 1.3 preservationLevel, includes four semantic components, such as 1.3.1 preservationLevelValue and 1.3.2 preservationLevelRole.

== See also ==
- Digital preservation
- Preservation metadata
- Metadata
- Digital library
- Protocol for Metadata Harvesting (OAI-PMH)
- Metadata Encoding and Transmission Standard (METS) maintained by the Library of Congress
- Dublin Core, an ISO metadata standard
