= National Geospatial Digital Archive =

American archive of cartographic information

The National Geospatial Digital Archive (NGDA) is an archive of cartographic information funded by the Library of Congress through the National Digital Information Infrastructure and Preservation Program (NDIIPP) in collaboration with the University of California Santa Barbara, and Stanford University. The purpose of the archive is to collect and preserve geospatial data and images on a national scale, and develop mechanisms for making data available for future generations.

== History ==
The NGDA is one of eight initial projects funded by the Library of Congress's National Digital Information Infrastructure and Preservation Program. It is a partnership between University of California Santa Barbara's Map & Imagery Laboratory at Davidson Library and Stanford University's Branner Earth Sciences Library.

== Objectives ==
Cartographic information is used by researchers, students, and other to study many subjects including disaster relief, population growth, and changes in agriculture. The NDIIPP established the National Geospatial Digital Library to several overlapping objectives. The primary objective is to establish an archive of, sometimes, at-risk digital data. The distributed nature of the archive is important in case of a natural or man-made disaster. The project is also developing mechanisms, like a wiki, to make the information available to users. An important goal of the project is building in flexibility so that changes in technology in the future will not damage the archive; this flexibility includes using metadata for all archived data. Other long-term objectives involve agreements between participating institutions about what information will be preserved and how the preservation will be carried out, how copyrighted material will be handled, and how universities can be assured that their faculty and students have access to their archived data.

== See also ==
- Digital curation
- Digital library
- Digital preservation
- National Digital Library Program (NDLP)
- Web archiving
