= Shapell Manuscript Foundation =

Israeli document preservation group

- Headquarters: Herzliya, Israel
- Website: http://www.shapell.org/

The Shapell Manuscript Foundation (SMF) is a non-profit independent educational organization dedicated to research and the collection of historical documents and original manuscripts. The Foundation focuses on the histories of the United States and the Holy Land, with emphasis on the people and events of the 19th and 20th centuries.

== Collection ==
The Shapell Manuscript Collection is a private holding of primary source documents relating to various events and historical figures in American, Jewish, and Holy Land history. Included in the Collection are signed documents, photographs and rare books. It is particularly rich with items from the Civil War era, Mark Twain, Albert Einstein, and many other historical figures. Among the many noteworthy items are exceptional letters written by George Washington, Abraham Lincoln, and John F. Kennedy.

== Website ==
The Shapell Manuscript Foundation's website offers a large digitized selection of the Collection online for public viewing and research. The online Collection is continuously expanding its offerings of primary source documents and historical artifacts as the digitization process continues.

== Shapell Roster Project ==
The Shapell Roster Project is the ongoing research of Jewish Civil War soldiers and their stories. As part of the Foundation's contribution to the Civil War Sesquicentennial Celebration, the Shapell Manuscript Foundation is preparing a new roster of Jewish Civil War soldiers. The Roster is based on a parallel section in Simon Wolf's book, The American Jew as Soldier, Patriot and Citizen, (1895), but uses modern research tools and technology to expand and correct the almost 120-year-old roster.

In addition, the Roster provides documentation (letters, photographs and official documents) for each soldier in the list. At the completion of the project all information and documents will be available online as well as be available in book form. The Union section of The Shapell Roster was made public and published online in 2022. The Confederate data is expected to be released by 2025.

== Jewish American Historical Research ==
In addition to a general focus on the historic manuscripts of universally recognized world-renowned individuals, the foundation's collection frequently relates to the history of American Jewish life. The collected manuscripts explore such topics as the lives of Jewish soldiers during the American Civil War and other topics which bring light to bear on the role of American Jews on the general society around them.

== Exhibitions ==
The documents and artifacts in the Foundation's holdings have been on display at various exhibitions internationally. While the Foundation produces its own exhibitions, it also serves as a resource for other institutions' research efforts and exhibitions. The Foundation has collaborated with various historical institutes by creating and enhancing exhibitions with items on loan, and by contributing original research.

The Foundation regularly exhibits at the National Library of Israel at the Hebrew University in Jerusalem. The administrative offices are located in the United States and Israel.

SMF loaned items to the Library of Congress for the traveling exhibition "With Malice Toward None: The Abraham Lincoln Bicentennial Exhibition." The exhibition toured from February 2009 until April 2011 and included letters written by Lincoln, signed portraits and more.

From December 2010 to March 2013 SMF collaborated on the joint exhibition at the National Library of Israel for the exhibit: "Dreamland: American Travelers to the Holy Land in the 19th Century." A sequel to that exhibition, "Dreams and Diplomacy in the Holy Land: American Consuls in Jerusalem in the 19th Century," opened in March 2013 and closed March, 2016.

The Smithsonian National Museum of American History exhibited several documents on loan from SMF at the exhibition: "Changing America: The Emancipation Proclamation, 1863, and the March on Washington, 1963" held from December 2012 until September 2013.

In 2015, SMF presented "With Firmness in the Right: Lincoln and the Jews" in collaboration with the New-York Historical Society and the Abraham Lincoln Presidential Library and Museum. The exhibition was produced in conjunction with the publication of the book, Lincoln and the Jews: A History, which contains original research and was co-authored by Professor Jonathan D. Sarna.

== Publications ==
The Holy Land with Echoes of British Mandate John Walker-Smith https://www.foyles.co.uk/book/the-holy-land/john-walker-smith/9781841042336 Publisher The Memoir Club

- Lincoln and the Jews: A History - By Jonathan D. Sarna and Benjamin Shapell
- Tourists, Travellers and Hotels in 19th-Century Jerusalem- by Shimon Gibson, Yoni Shapira, and Rupert L. Chapman III
- On Chariots with Horses of Fire and Iron-by Anthony S. Travis
- The Dreamland Exhibition Catalog: American Travelers to the Holy Land in the 19th Century-by Tony Travis
- Dreams and Diplomacy in the Holy Land, American Consuls in Jerusalem in the 19th Century-Editors: Nirit Shalev Khalifa, Dina Grossman

== Films/videos ==
- Jewish Soldiers in Blue and Gray- Presented by SMF- An Indigo Films Production- released in 2011
- Lincoln's Last Days- A Journey by the Shapell Manuscript Foundation
- The Mortal Presidents
- Mark Twain and other American Travelers to the Holy Land in the 19th Century
