= Bernard L. Diamond =

American psychiatrist and legal scholar

Bernard Lee Diamond (December 18, 1912 – November 18, 1990) was a professor of law and psychiatry at the University of California, Berkeley. He is primarily known for his contribution to what is known as forensic psychiatry. He was an expert witness for the defense in many well known trials, most notably the trial of Sirhan Sirhan, who was convicted of killing Robert F. Kennedy. The defense based much of their case on Diamond's testimony that Sirhan was suffering from diminished capacity at the time that he fired the deadly shots. In the 1980s, Jonathon Marks, who was representing Mark David Chapman for his alleged act of murdering John Lennon, brought Dr. Diamond in to perform medical legal evaluations on Chapman, but because Chapman later decided to plead guilty Diamond did not give testimony.
