= Sirhan Sirhan =

Assassin of Robert F. Kennedy (born 1944)

- سرحان سرحان
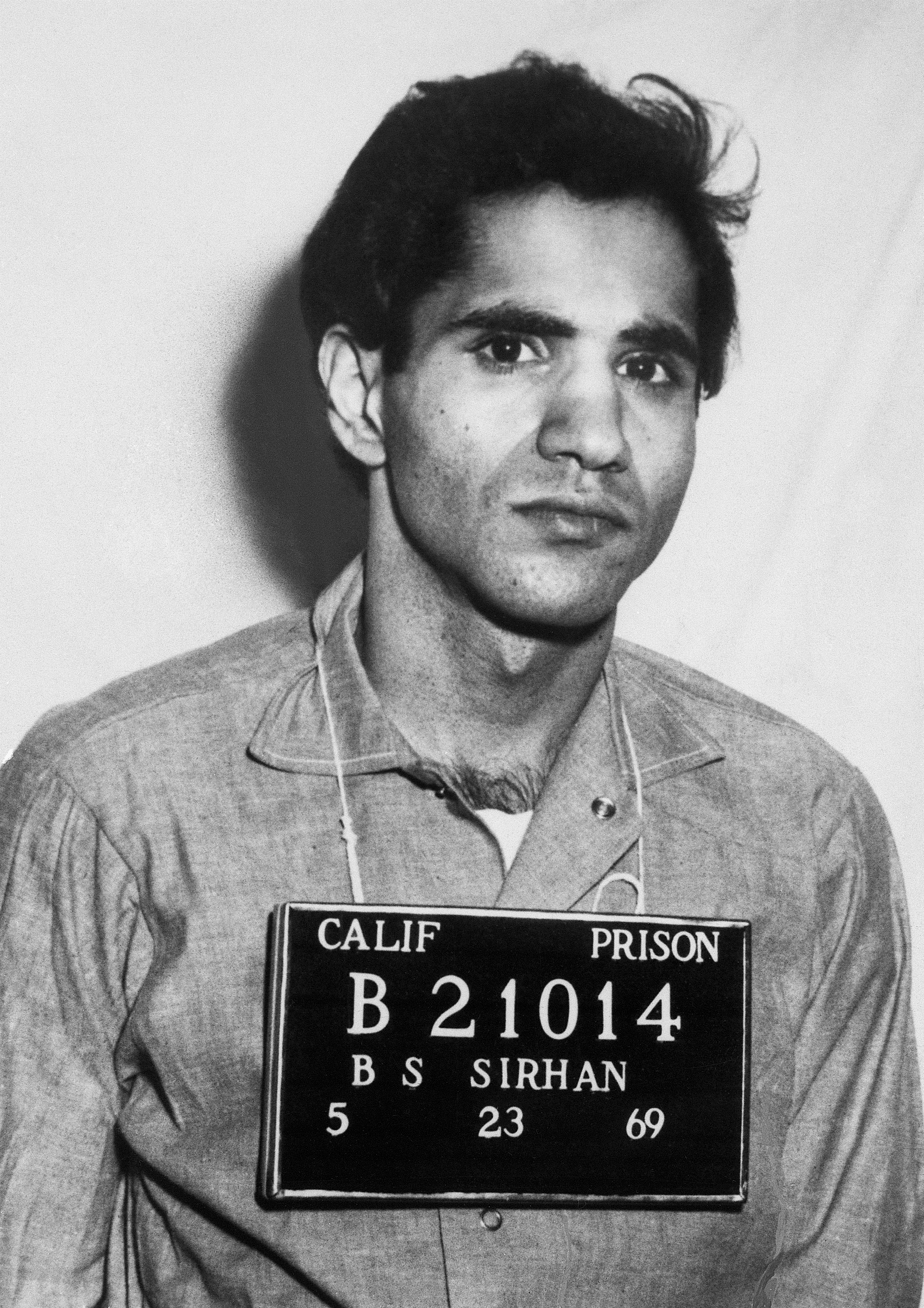
- Mugshot of Sirhan in 1969
- Born: Sirhan Bishara Sirhan; March 19, 1944 (age 82); Jerusalem, Mandatory Palestine
- Citizenship: Palestine (until 1948); Jordan (since 1949)
- Known for: Assassination of Robert F. Kennedy
- Status: Incarcerated at Richard J. Donovan Correctional Facility (as of 2026)
- Motive: Retribution for Kennedy's support for Israel following the Six-Day War
- Convictions: 6 counts (Note: First-degree murder; Assault with a deadly weapon with intent to commit murder (×5))
- Penalty: Death by gas chamber (1969, commuted); Life imprisonment with the possibility of parole (1972)

Details
- Date: June 5, 1968; 12:15 a.m.
- Locations: Ambassador Hotel, Los Angeles, California, U.S.
- Target: Robert F. Kennedy
- Killed: 1 (Kennedy)
- Injured: 5
- Weapon: Iver Johnson .22 LR revolver
- Date apprehended: June 5, 1968; he has served 58 years, 162 days in prison

Signature
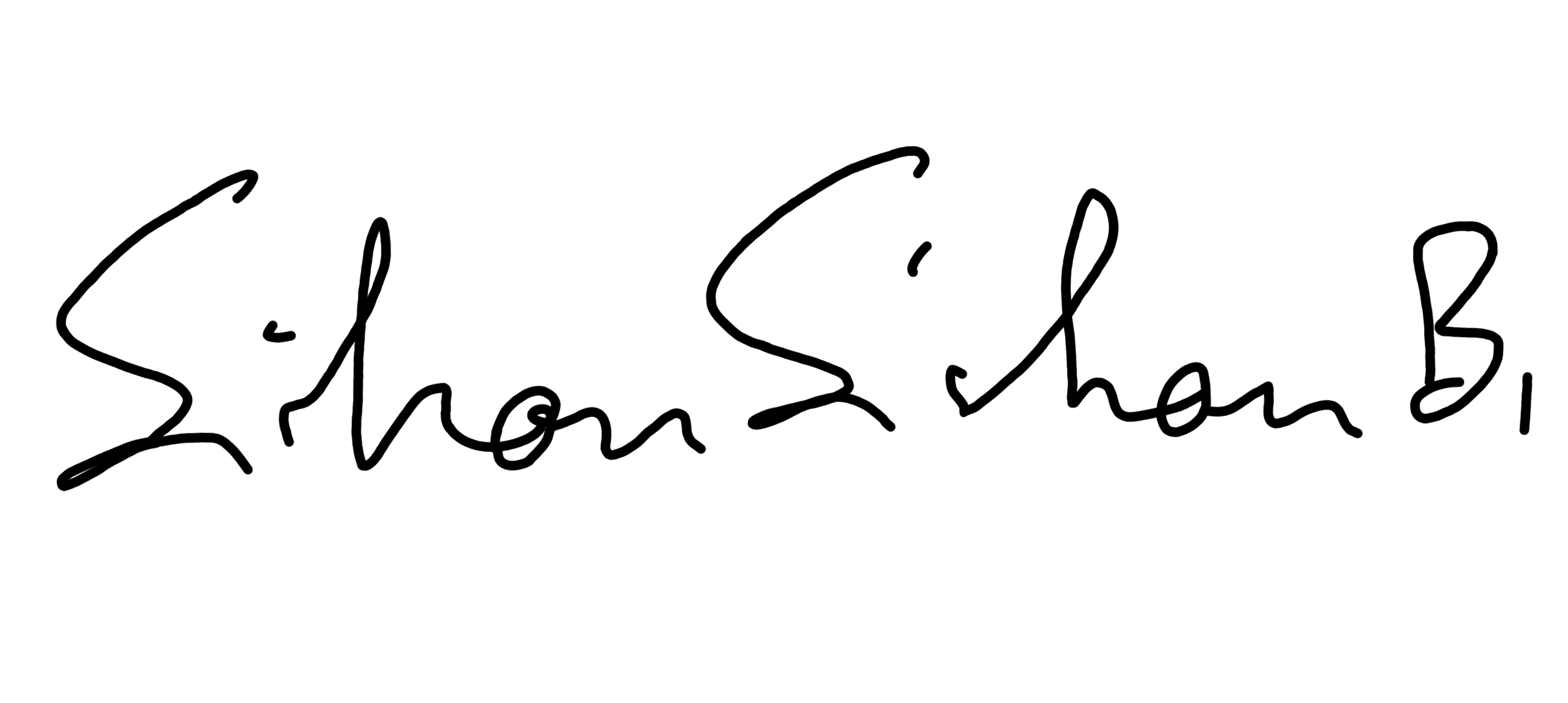

Sirhan Bishara Sirhan (/sɪərˈhɑːn/; Arabic: سرحان بشارة سرحان Sirḥān Bišāra Sirḥān; born March 19, 1944) is a Palestinian-Jordanian man who assassinated U.S. senator and former attorney general Robert F. Kennedy, the younger brother of president John F. Kennedy and a candidate for the Democratic nomination in the 1968 U.S. presidential election, on June 5, 1968. Sirhan was 24 years old at the time. On April 17, 1969, he was convicted of first-degree murder, among other charges. He was subsequently sentenced to death by gas chamber. In 1972, this was commuted to a life sentence in the aftermath of People v. Anderson. The circumstances surrounding the attack, which took place five years after President Kennedy's assassination, have led to numerous conspiracy theories.

In 1989, Sirhan told British journalist David Frost: "My only connection with Robert Kennedy was his sole support of Israel and his deliberate attempt to send those 50 fighter jets to Israel to obviously do harm to the Palestinians." Some scholars believe that the assassination was the first major incident of political violence in the United States stemming from the Israeli–Palestinian conflict (Sirhan carried out the attack on the first anniversary of the 1967 Arab–Israeli War), although it occurred at a time when the American public was overwhelmingly focused on the Vietnam War.

Sirhan is incarcerated at Richard J. Donovan Correctional Facility near San Diego. On August 27, 2021, after 15 years of being denied parole by the local state board, he was granted parole by a two-person panel. Prosecutors declined to participate in or oppose his release in accordance with the directive of Los Angeles County District Attorney George Gascón that the prosecutors' role ends at sentencing and they should not influence decisions to release prisoners. On January 13, 2022, California governor Gavin Newsom blocked Sirhan's release on parole. He was denied parole again on March 1, 2023.

== Early life ==
Sirhan Bishara Sirhan was born March 19, 1944, in Mandatory Palestine, in Jerusalem's Musrara neighborhood, into an Arab Palestinian Christian family. He became a Jordanian citizen in December 1949, just before Jordan annexed the West Bank. According to his mother, Mary, Sirhan was traumatized by the violence he witnessed in the Arab–Israeli conflict as a child, including the death of his older brother, who was run over by a military vehicle which was swerving to evade gunfire.

When Sirhan was 12 years old, his family immigrated to the U.S., moving briefly to New York and then to California. He attended Eliot Junior High School, John Muir High School, John Marshall Junior High School (now called Thurgood Marshall Secondary School), and Pasadena City College. Shortly after the family's move to California, Sirhan's father, Bishara Salame Sirhan, returned alone to the Middle East. Standing 5 feet 5 inches (165 cm) and weighing 120 pounds (54 kg) at age 20, Sirhan moved to Corona to train to become a horse jockey while working at a stable, but lost his job and abandoned the pursuit after suffering a head injury in a racing accident.

Sirhan never became a U.S. citizen, instead retaining his Jordanian citizenship. As an adult, he changed church denominations several times, joining Baptist and Seventh-day Adventist churches. In 1966, he joined the esoteric Ancient Mystical Order of the Rose Cross, one of the Rosicrucian Orders.

== Assassination of Robert F. Kennedy ==
Around 12:15 a.m. PDT on June 5, 1968, Sirhan fired a .22 LR Iver-Johnson Cadet revolver at United States senator Robert F. Kennedy and the crowd surrounding him in the Ambassador Hotel in Los Angeles, shortly after Kennedy had finished addressing supporters in the hotel's main ballroom. Authors George Plimpton, Jimmy Breslin, and Pete Hamill, former professional football player Rosey Grier and 1960 Olympic gold medalist Rafer Johnson were among several men who subdued and disarmed Sirhan after a struggle.

Kennedy was shot three times—once in the head and twice in the back—with a fourth bullet passing through his jacket. He died about 26 hours later at Good Samaritan Hospital. Five other people at the event were also shot, all of whom recovered: Paul Schrade, an official with the United Auto Workers union; William Weisel, an ABC TV unit manager; Ira Goldstein, a reporter with the Continental News Service; Elizabeth Evans, a friend of Pierre Salinger, one of Kennedy's campaign aides; and Irwin Stroll, a teenage campaign volunteer.

=== Conspiracy theories ===
The assassination spawned many conspiracy theories, many of which claimed there was a "second gunman" or that Sirhan was not the true killer. In a 2018 interview with The Washington Post, Robert F. Kennedy Jr. said that he had traveled to California to meet with Sirhan in prison and, after a relatively long conversation (the details of which he would not disclose), had come to believe that Sirhan did not kill his father and that a second gunman was involved.

== Prosecution ==
Even though Sirhan admitted his guilt in a recorded confession while in police custody on June 9, a long, publicized trial followed in The People of the State of California v. Sirhan Sirhan. The judge did not accept Sirhan's confession and denied his request to withdraw his plea of "not guilty" to plead "guilty".

On February 10, 1969, Sirhan's lawyers made a motion in chambers to enter a plea of guilty to first-degree murder in exchange for life imprisonment rather than the death penalty. Sirhan told Judge Herbert V. Walker that he wanted to withdraw his original plea of not guilty to plead guilty as charged on all counts. He also asked that his counsel "dissociate themselves from this case completely". The judge asked him what he wanted to do about sentencing, and Sirhan replied, "I will ask to be executed." Walker denied the motion and said, "This court will not accept the plea." He also rejected Sirhan's request for his counsel to withdraw; his counsel entered another motion to withdraw from the case of their own volition, but Walker also denied that. Walker subsequently ordered that the record be sealed about the motion.

The trial proceeded, and opening statements began on February 12. The lead prosecutor in the case was Lynn "Buck" Compton, a World War II veteran of Easy Company fame who later became a justice of the California Court of Appeal. David Fitts delivered the prosecution's opening statement, providing examples of Sirhan's preparations to kill Kennedy. The prosecution showed that Sirhan was seen at the Ambassador Hotel on June 3, two nights before the attack, to learn the building's layout, and that he visited a gun range on June 4. Alvin Clark, Sirhan's garbage collector, testified that Sirhan had told him a month before the attack of his intention to shoot Kennedy.

Sirhan's defense counsel included attorney Grant Cooper, who had hoped to demonstrate that the killing had been the impulsive act of a man with a mental deficiency. But Walker admitted into evidence pages from three of Sirhan's journal notebooks that suggested the crime was premeditated and "quite calculating and willful". On March 3, Cooper asked Sirhan in direct testimony whether he had shot Kennedy; Sirhan replied, "Yes, sir", but then said that he did not bear Kennedy any ill will. Sirhan also testified that he had killed Kennedy "with twenty years of malice aforethought". He explained in an interview with David Frost in 1989 that this referred to the time since the creation of the State of Israel. He has maintained since then that he has no memory of the crime or of making that statement in court.

The defense based its case primarily on the expert testimony of Bernard L. Diamond, a professor of law and psychiatry, who testified that Sirhan was suffering from diminished capacity at the time of the murder. Sirhan was convicted on April 17, 1969, and was sentenced six days later to death by gas chamber. Three years later, his sentence was commuted to life in prison, owing to the California Supreme Court's decision in People v. Anderson, which ruled that capital punishment violates the California Constitution's prohibition against cruel or unusual punishment. The February 1972 decision was retroactive, invalidating all existing death sentences in California.

=== Appeals ===
Sirhan's lawyer Lawrence Teeter later argued that Grant Cooper was compromised by a conflict of interest and was, as a consequence, grossly negligent in defense of his client. The defense moved for a new trial amid claims of setups, police bungles, hypnotism, brainwashing, blackmail and government conspiracies. On June 5, 2003, Teeter petitioned a federal court in Los Angeles to move the case to Fresno. He argued that Sirhan could not get a fair hearing in Los Angeles, where a man who helped prosecute him was then a federal judge: U.S. District Judge William Matthew Byrne Jr. in Los Angeles was an assistant U.S. attorney during Sirhan's trial, and part of the prosecutorial team.

Since 1994, Teeter had been trying to have state and federal courts overturn Sirhan's conviction, arguing his client was hypnotized and framed, possibly by a government conspiracy. During one hearing, Teeter referred to testimony from the original trial transcripts regarding a prosecution eyewitness to the attack, author George Plimpton, in which he said that Sirhan looked "enormously composed. He seemed ... purged." This statement coincided with the defense's argument that Sirhan had shot Kennedy while in a hypnotic trance. The motion was denied. Teeter died in 2005, and Sirhan declined other counsel to replace him.

On November 26, 2011, Sirhan's defense teams filed court papers for a new trial, saying that "expert analysis of recently-uncovered evidence shows two guns were fired in the assassination and that Sirhan's revolver was not the gun that shot Kennedy", and he "should be freed from prison or granted a new trial based on 'formidable evidence', asserting his innocence and 'horrendous violations' of his rights". On January 5, 2015, U.S. District Judge Beverly Reid O'Connell denied Sirhan's motion, saying that Sirhan "failed to meet the showing required for actual innocence" that might excuse his having failed to seek his freedom sooner in federal court. "Though petitioner advances several theories regarding the events of June 5, 1968, petitioner does not dispute that he fired eight rounds of gunfire in the kitchen pantry of the Ambassador Hotel", O'Connell wrote. "Petitioner does not show that it is more likely than not that no juror, acting reasonably, would have found him guilty beyond a reasonable doubt."

=== Motives ===
Sirhan's diary
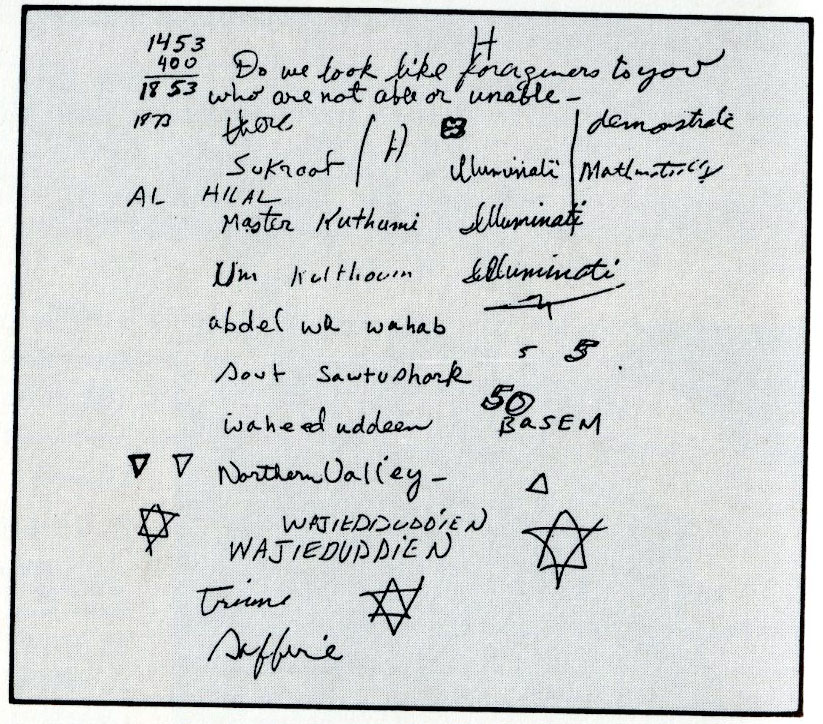
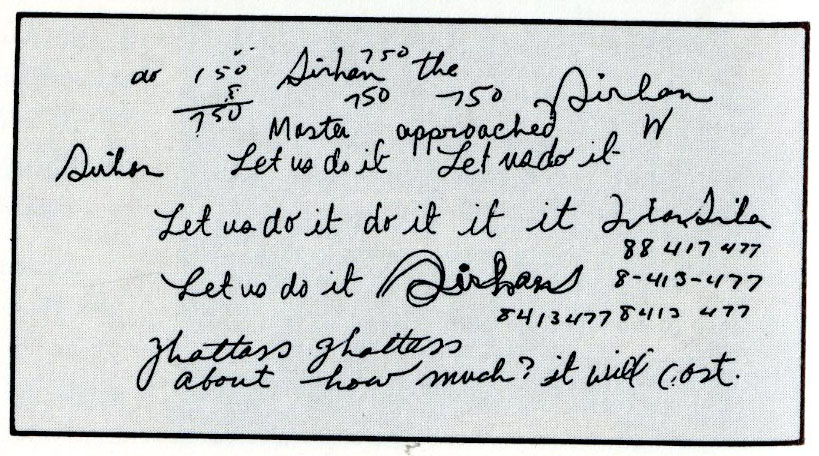

A motive cited for Sirhan's actions is the Middle East conflict. After his arrest, Sirhan said, "I can explain it. I did it for my country." He said he believed he was deliberately betrayed by Kennedy's support for Israel in the June 1967 Six-Day War, which had begun exactly one year before the assassination. During a search of Sirhan's apartment after his arrest, a spiral-bound notebook was found containing a diary entry that demonstrated that his anger had gradually fixated on Kennedy, who had promised to send 50 fighter jets to Israel if elected president. Sirhan's journal entry of May 18, 1968, read: "My determination to eliminate R.F.K. is becoming the more and more [sic] of an unshakable obsession ... Kennedy must die before June 5th." Other notebooks and diary entries expressing Sirhan's growing rage at Kennedy were found; his journals also contained many aphorisms that were thought to be his version of "free writing". He wrote in support of communism: "Long live Communism ... I firmly support the communist cause and its people ... American capitalism will fall and give way to the worker's dictatorship."

On June 6, a front-page article in the Los Angeles Times interpreted the attack on Kennedy as an act of antisemitism rather than political protest. The article read: "When the Jordanian nationalist, Sirhan Bishara Sirhan, allegedly shot Kennedy, ostensibly because of the senator's advocacy of U.S. support for Israel, the crime with which he was charged was in essence another manifestation of the centuries-old hatred between Arab and Jew." M. T. Mehdi, then secretary-general of the Action Committee on American-Arab Relations, believed that Sirhan had acted in justifiable self-defense, saying: "Sirhan was defending himself against those 50 Phantom jets Kennedy was sending to Israel." Mehdi wrote a book called Kennedy and Sirhan: Why? In a 1980 interview, Sirhan said he had been drunk on the night of the attack, which was also the anniversary of the 1967 Arab-Israeli war: "You must remember the circumstances of that night, June 5. That was when I was provoked. That is when I initially went to observe the Jewish Zionist parade in celebration of the June 5, 1967, victory over the Arabs. That was the catalyst that triggered me on that night ... In addition, there was the consumption of the liquor, and I want the public to understand that."

== Imprisonment ==
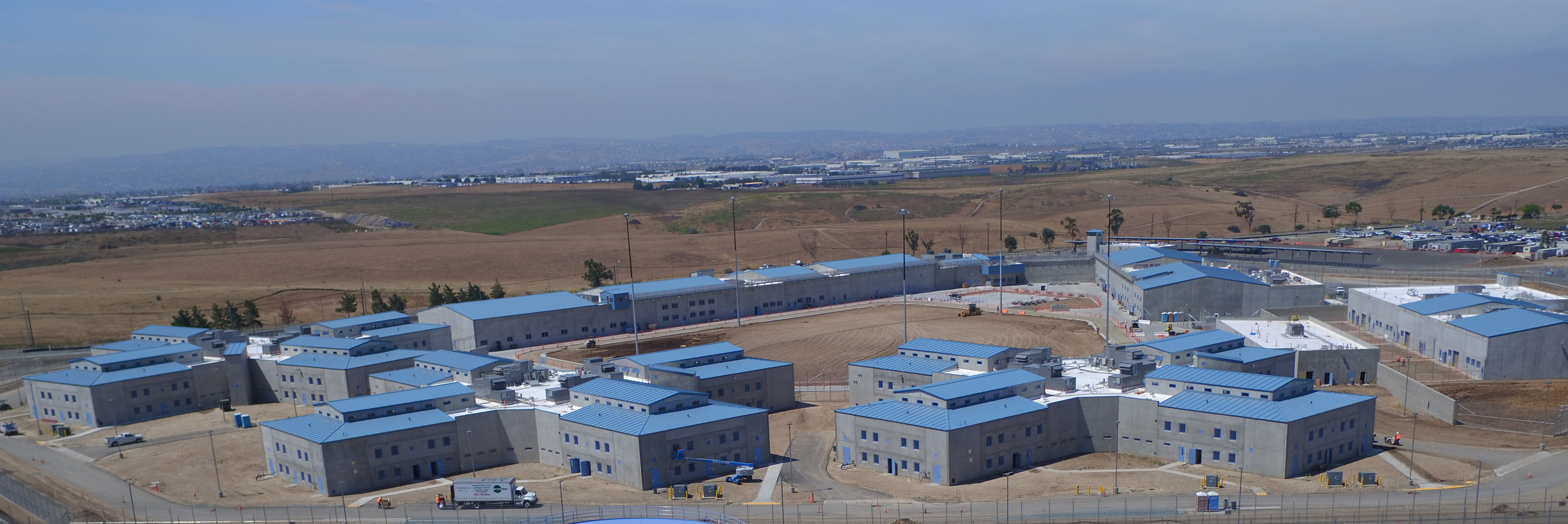
Sirhan is currently imprisoned at Richard J. Donovan Correctional Facility near San Diego.

In 1971, Sirhan was housed in the Adjustment Center at San Quentin State Prison. He was subsequently transferred to the Correctional Training Facility (CTF) in Soledad, California, where he was confined until 1992. From 1992 to 2009, he was confined at the California State Prison (COR) in Corcoran, California, and lived in COR's Protective Housing Unit until he was moved to a harsher lockdown at COR in 2003. In October 2009, ostensibly for his safety, he was transferred to the Pleasant Valley State Prison in Coalinga, California, where he was housed in a cell by himself. He was subsequently moved back to Corcoran.

On November 22, 2013, Sirhan was transferred from Corcoran to Richard J. Donovan Correctional Facility in San Diego County. The transfer occurred on the 50th anniversary of the assassination of Robert's brother, President John F. Kennedy; the California Department of Corrections and Rehabilitation said that the transfer was routine and its timing "simply an unfortunate coincidence". On August 30, 2019, Sirhan was stabbed several times by another prisoner. He was taken to a hospital, where his condition was reported as stable. He returned to the prison two days later, after his discharge from the hospital. In a 1980 interview with M. T. Mehdi, Sirhan had claimed that his actions were fueled by liquor and anger and complained that the parole board was not taking these "mitigating" circumstances into account when it continually denied his parole.

=== Supporters ===
In 1974, Bill Ayers and Bernardine Dohrn dedicated their communist manifesto Prairie Fire: The Politics of Revolutionary Anti-Imperialism to Sirhan (along with 200 others), hailing him as a courageous political prisoner. In February 1973, Sirhan's release was one of the demands of the Black September Organization, which took American hostages at the Saudi Arabian Embassy in Khartoum.

=== Parole hearings ===
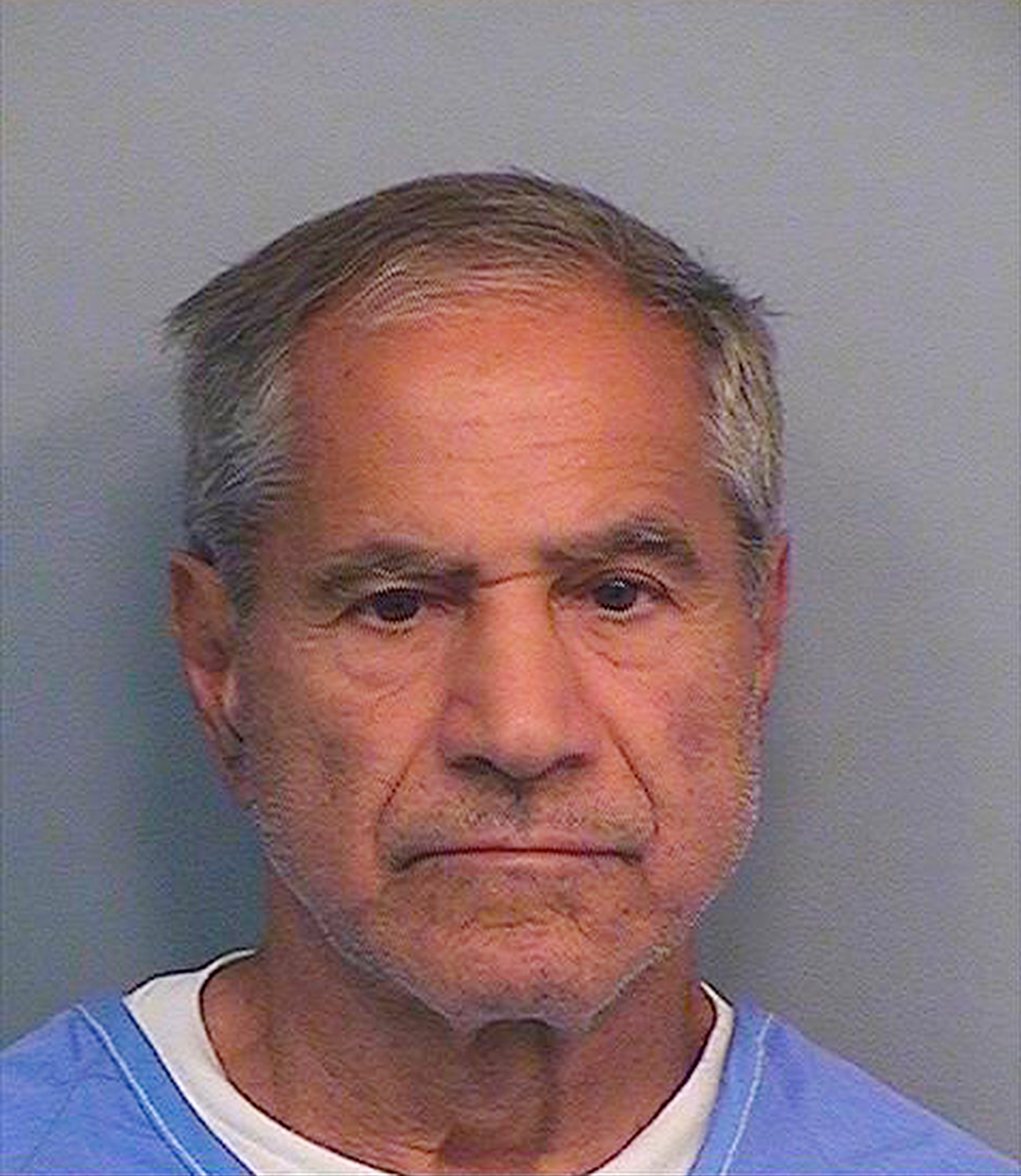
Sirhan's 2016 mugshot

In 1982, Sirhan told the parole board: "I sincerely believe that if Robert Kennedy were alive today, I believe he would not countenance singling me out for this kind of treatment. I think he would be among the first to say that, however horrible the deed I committed 14 years ago was, that it should not be the cause for denying me equal treatment under the laws of this country."

Sirhan was denied parole for the 14th time in 2011. He was denied parole again in 2016, at his 15th parole hearing. One of Sirhan's shooting victims from that night, Paul Schrade, aged 91 at the time of the hearing, testified in his support, stating his belief that a second shooter killed Kennedy and that Sirhan was intended to be a distraction from the real gunman by an unknown conspiracy. Sirhan repeated his claim to have no memory of the shooting, saying: "It's all vague now. I'm sure you all have it in your records. I can't deny it or confirm it. I just wish this whole thing had never taken place." His parole was denied because he had not expressed adequate remorse for his crime or acknowledged its severity.

On August 27, 2021, in his 16th appearance before the parole board, the board's two-person panel voted to grant Sirhan parole after finding that he no longer posed a threat to society. He had served 53 years in prison. Two of Kennedy's surviving sons, Robert Jr. and Douglas, offered their support for parole during Sirhan's appearance before the parole board. Parole Board Commissioner Robert Barton told Sirhan, "We think that you have grown." The decision was subject to a 120-day review by the California Board of Parole Hearings, after which the governor of California had 30 days to grant, reverse, or modify the decision.

Six other surviving children of Robert F. Kennedy—Joseph, Courtney, Kerry, Christopher, Maxwell, and Rory—opposed parole for Sirhan, urged the full parole board or Governor Gavin Newsom to reverse the recommendation, and filed a statement with the parole board opposing Sirhan's release. Rory Kennedy wrote a guest essay in the New York Times saying that Sirhan did not deserve parole, citing his lack of remorse and unwillingness to accept responsibility.

Neither Los Angeles County District Attorney George Gascón nor any office staff appeared at the parole hearing or took any position on parole for Sirhan. This was a break from the previous practice of the prosecution, which had opposed parole in all of Sirhan's previous hearings. Upon taking office, Gascón had issued a directive that his office's "default policy" was not to attend parole hearings or take a position on parole. It was later acknowledged that Sirhan's parole was also aided by a recent California law that required the parole board to consider things like age, health, and childhood trauma as mitigating factors—things it had not considered before. On January 13, 2022, Newsom denied Sirhan's latest bid for parole. In a Los Angeles Times op-ed, Newsom wrote that even though the state parole board had recommended Sirhan for parole, the severity of the crime and Sirhan's "refusal to accept responsibility for it" led him to deny the request. At Sirhan's 17th parole board appearance on March 1, 2023, he was again denied parole. Sirhan has waived his right to contest deportation if he is paroled.

== In media ==
- Sirhan was portrayed by David Kobzantsev in the 2006 film Bobby.
- Sirhan is the subject of the 2007 investigative documentary RFK Must Die.

== See also ==
- Notable inmates at California State Prison, Corcoran
- Robert F. Kennedy's 1948 visit to Palestine
