= Open Archival Information System =

Standard for archival system

The term Open Archival Information System (or OAIS) refers to the ISO OAIS Reference Model for an OAIS. This reference model is defined by recommendation CCSDS 650.0-M-3 of the Consultative Committee for Space Data Systems; this text is identical to ISO 14721:2025. The CCSDS's purview is space agencies, but the OAIS model it developed has proved useful to other organizations and institutions with digital archiving needs. OAIS, known as ISO 14721:2025, is widely accepted and utilized by various organizations and disciplines, both national and international, and was designed to ensure preservation. The OAIS standard, published in 2005, is considered the optimum standard to create and maintain a digital repository over a long period of time.

The OAIS model can be applied to various archives, e.g., open access, closed, restricted, "dark", or proprietary.

The information being maintained has been deemed to need "long term preservation", even if the OAIS itself is not permanent. "Long term" is long enough to be concerned with the impacts of changing technologies, including support for new media and data formats, or with a changing user community. "Long term" may extend indefinitely. The OAIS defines a long period of time as any length of time that might be impacted by changing technologies and the changing of "Designated Community," e.g., any group of consumers capable of understanding the information. This length of time can be indefinite. The archive defines the community and that definition is not fixed.

The "O" in OAIS represents the "open way the standard was developed", and does not represent "open access", or the usage of the term open in the Open Definition or Open Archives Initiative. The "I" in OAIS represents "information", meaning data that can be shared or exchanged.

In this reference model there is a particular focus on digital information, both as the primary forms of information held and as supporting information for both digitally and physically archived materials. Therefore, the model accommodates information that is inherently non-digital (e.g., a physical sample), but the modeling and preservation of such information is not addressed in detail. As strictly a conceptual framework, the OAIS model does not require the use of any particular computing platform, system environment, system design paradigm, system development methodology, database management system, database design paradigm, data definition language, command language, system interface, user interface, technology, or media for an archive to be compliant. Its aim is to set the standard for the activities that are involved in preserving a digital archive rather than the method for carrying out those activities.

The acronym OAIS should not be confused with OAI, which is the Open Archives Initiative.

== The OAIS environment and information model ==
OAIS environment diagram

OAIS information package diagram

The OAIS environment involves the interaction of four entities: producers of information, consumers of information (or the designated community), management, and the archive itself. The management component of the OAIS environment is not an entity that carries out day-to-day maintenance of an archive but a person or group that sets policies for the content contained in the archive.

The OAIS model also defines an information model. Physical or digital items which contain information are known as data objects. Members of the Designated Community for an archive should be able to interpret and understand the information contained in a data object either because of their established knowledge base or with the assistance of supplementary "representation information" that is included with the data object.

An information package includes the following information objects:

- Content Information: this includes the data object and its representation information
- Preservation Description Information: contains information necessary to preserve its affiliated content information (such as information about the item's provenance, unique identifiers, a Checksum or other authentication data, etc.)
- Packaging Information: holds the components of the information package together
- Descriptive Information: metadata about the object which allows the object to be located at a later time using the archive's search or retrieval functions

There are three types of information package in the OAIS reference model:

- Submission Information Package (SIP): which is the information sent from the producer to the archive
- Archival Information Package (AIP): which is the information stored by the archive
- Dissemination Information Package (DIP): which is the information sent to a user when requested

These three information packages may or may not be identical to each other.

== The functional model ==
OAIS functional model diagram

There are six functional entities in an OAIS:

- Ingest function: receives information from producers and packages it for storage. It accepts a SIP, verifies it, creates an AIP from the SIP, and transfers the newly created AIP to archival storage
- Archival Storage function: stores, maintains, and retrieves AIPs. It accepts AIPs submitted from the Ingest function, assigns them to long term storage, migrates AIPs as needed, checks for errors, and provides requested AIPs to the Access function
- Data Management function: coordinates the Descriptive Information of the AIPs and the system information that supports the archive. It maintains the database that contains the archive's information by executing query requests and generating results; generates reports in support of other functions; and updates the database.
- Administration function: manages the daily operations of the archive. This function attains submission agreements from information producers, performs system engineering, audits SIPs to ensure compliance with submission agreements, develops policies and standards. It handles customer service and acts as the interface between Management and the Designated Community in the OAIS environment.
- Preservation Planning function: supports all tasks to keep the archive material accessible and understandable over long terms even if the original computing system becomes obsolete, e.g. development of detailed preservation/migration plans, technology watch, evaluation and risk analysis of content and recommendation of update and migration.
- Access function: This function includes the user interface that allows users to retrieve information from the archive. It generates a DIP from the relevant AIP and delivers it to the customer who has requested the information.

== Adoption ==
Although originally developed by the Consultative Committee for Space Data Systems, a body dedicated to overseeing space agencies, as digital preservation has become a discipline unto itself, the OAIS has become the standard model for digital preservation systems at many institutions and organizations. OAIS-compliance has been a stated fundamental design requirement for major digital preservation and repository development efforts at the National Archives and Records Administration, Library of Congress, British Library, Bibliothèque nationale de France, National Library of the Netherlands, the Digital Curation Centre in the UK, OCLC (the Online Computer Library Center), the JSTOR (Journal Storage) scholarly journal archive, as well as several university library systems. Centre of Excellence for Digital Preservation, C-DAC, India has implemented OAIS for National Cultural Audiovisual Archive (NCAA) which has been certified as Trusted Digital Repository as per ISO 16363: 2012 during November 2017. This initiative was a part of Indian National Digital Preservation Program (NDPP). The OAIS has been the basis of numerous prominent digital preservation initiatives and standards including the Preservation Metadata: Implementation Strategies working group and the Trustworthy Repositories Audit & Certification (TRAC) document from OCLC. which was an initial draft of, and subsequently superseded by, CCSDS 652.1-M-2 of the Consultative Committee for Space Data Systems; this text is identical to ISO 16363:2012 which forms the basis of the ISO audit and certification of Trustworthy Repositories, described at iso16363.org. The ISO 19165:1-2018 recommends the use of the Open Packaging Conventions to implement the Geospatial Package.

== Software architecture model ==
As part of #WeMissiPres, Frank Obermeit, a computer scientist at the State Archives of Saxony-Anhalt, Germany, presented a software architecture model that fully implements the Open Archival Information System (OAIS) reference model on 22 September 2020. An appliance developed on the architecture model has been available since October 2020. The architecture model is based exclusively on de facto and de jure standards and the appliance developed according to it was realised exclusively with open source products. The three main standards are Business Process Model and Notation (BPMN), Representational State Transfer (REST) and OpenID Connect (OIDC). Scalability, distributability and extensibility are further essential features and enable the use in organisations of different sizes.

== See also ==
- Data curation
- Digital preservation
- National Digital Library Program (NDLP)
- National Digital Information Infrastructure and Preservation Program (NDIIPP)
- CASPAR digital preservation project
- Trustworthy Repositories Audit & Certification
- National Digital Preservation Program (NDPP), India
