= National Digital Information Infrastructure and Preservation Program =

Archival program by the Library of Congress

The National Digital Information Infrastructure and Preservation Program (NDIIPP) of the United States was an archival program led by the Library of Congress to preserve and provide access to digital resources. The program convened several working groups, administered grant projects, and disseminated information about digital preservation issues. The U.S. Congress appropriated funds to establish the program in 2000, and official activity specific to NDIIPP itself wound down between 2016 and 2018. The Library of Congress was chosen to lead the initiative because of its role as one of the leading providers of high-quality content on the Internet. The Library of Congress formed a national network of partners dedicated to preserving specific types of digital content that is at risk of loss.

In July 2010, the Library of Congress launched the National Digital Stewardship Alliance (NDSA) to extend the work of NDIIPP to more partner institutions. The organization, which has been hosted by the Digital Library Federation since January 2016, focuses on several goals. It develops improved preservation standards and practices, works with experts to identify categories of digital information that are most worthy of preservation, and takes steps to incorporate content into a national collection. It provides national leadership for digital preservation education and training. NDSA also provides communication and outreach for all aspects of digital preservation. The NDSA membership includes universities, professional associations, commercial businesses, consortia, and government agencies.

== Overview ==
The preservation of digital content has become a major challenge for libraries and archives whose mission is to preserve the intellectual and cultural heritage of the nation in the digital age. In 1996, a federal task force on the archiving of digital information recommended that a national digital archival system should be implemented to preserve and provide access to digital cultural heritage information. From this report, Congress appropriated funds in the 2000 budget to create the beginnings of the NDIIPP.

The Librarian of Congress James H. Billington commissioned the National Research Council Computer Science and Telecommunications Board of the National Academy of Sciences to evaluate the Library's readiness to meet the challenges of the rapidly evolving digital world. This oversight group was headed by the Associate Librarian for Strategic Initiatives, the Associate Librarian for Library Services, and the Register of Copyrights. This group held several planning meetings to assess the current state of digital archiving and preservation. They recommended that the Library, working with other federal and non-federal institutions, take the lead in a national, cooperative effort to archive and preserve digital information.

The U.S. Congress has asked the Library of Congress to lead a collaborative project, called the National Digital Information Infrastructure and Preservation Program. In December 2000, Congress passed special legislation (Public Law 106-554) in recognition of the importance of preserving digital content for future generations, appropriating $100 million to the Library of Congress to lead this effort. ($75 million of which was slated for dollar for dollar cost matching) for the effort. Congress rescinded $47 million in unspent funds in 2007. In 2009, NDIIPP received about $6.5 million as a line item in the Library's annual budget appropriation.

This effort falls within the Library Services mission, which includes providing access to and preserving information for the benefit of the United States and the World. This mission extends to materials in electronic formats as well. In addition, the Library is the home of the U.S. Copyright Office and is thus already engaged in issues relating to copyright in a digital environment.

== Participating organizations ==
The National Digital Information Infrastructure and Preservation Program is a cooperative effort.

The Library works closely with partners to assess considerations for shared responsibilities. Federal legislation calls for the Library to work jointly with the Secretary of Commerce, the director of the White House Office of Science and Technology Policy, and the National Archives and Records Administration. The legislation also directs the Library to seek the participation of "other federal, research and private libraries and institutions with expertise in the collection and maintenance of archives of digital materials," including the National Library of Medicine, the National Agricultural Library, the Research Libraries Group, the Online Computer Library Center, U.S. Government Printing Office (GPO), the Smithsonian, the National Park Service, and the Council on Library and Information Resources.

The Library also works with the non-federal sector. The overall strategy is being executed in cooperation with the library, creative, publishing, technology, and copyright communities. In early 2001, the Library established a National Digital Strategy Advisory Board to help guide it through the planning process. This board is made up of experts from the technology, publishing, Internet, library, and intellectual-property communities, as well as government.

The Library has also established a working group to look at ways that current copyright law can address how libraries and archives handle digital materials when preserving them and making them available to users.

== Digital preservation partnership projects ==
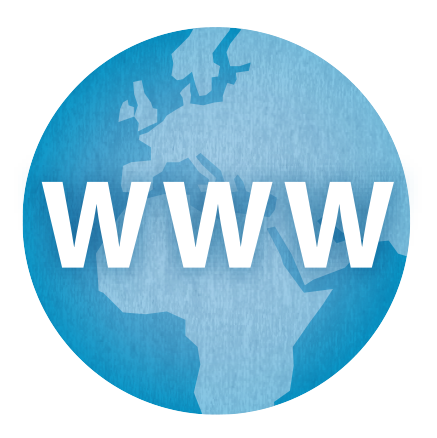
Digital Preservation Icon

The Library of Congress announced a call for proposals to begin the national digital archival network in 2003. It was their goal to choose partnership programs that collaborate across institutions to collect, preserve, and build best practices for the archival of at-risk digital content. After a process of peer-review by the National Endowment for the Humanities, eight project proposals were chosen. The original eight partnerships included:

- Development of digital archival infrastructure to preserve collections of web-based materials focusing on local political movements led by the California Digital Library at the University of California, partnering with New York University, University of North Texas, and other library collaborators.
- Creation of the National Geospatial Digital Archive, a national network dedicated to archiving geospatial imagery and data led by the University of California at Santa Barbara, partnering with Stanford University.
- Develop national standards for the archival of public television programs, led by Educational Broadcasting Company (Thirteen/WNET New York), in partnership with WGBH Educational Foundation, Public Broadcasting Service (PBS), and New York University.
- Preserve Southern culture and history through the development of a MetaArchive of Southern Digital Culture, led by Emory University in partnership with University of Louisville Libraries, Virginia Polytechnic Institute and State University Libraries, Florida State University Libraries, Auburn University Libraries, Georgia Institute of Technology Library and Information Center.
- Development of software and digital repository architectures and the creation of ways to test digital library infrastructure, led by the University of Illinois at Urbana-Champaign Library, in partnership with Online Computer Library Center (OCLC), Tufts University, Michigan State University, and the state libraries from Arizona, Connecticut, Illinois, North Carolina, and Wisconsin.
- An archive of online “business culture” and early Internet venture creation at www.dotcomarchive.org and www.businessplanarchive.org, led by the University of Maryland Robert H. Smith School of Business, in partnership with the Center for History and New Media at George Mason University, and the Internet Archive.
- Creation of a political and social science survey archive, led by the University of Michigan, in partnership with the University of Connecticut, University of North Carolina-Chapel Hill, the Harvard-MIT Data Center, and the National Archives and Records Administration.
- Collect and preserve geospatial data resources using the digitized maps from North Carolina government agencies, creating a guide for other states to make similar archives. Led by North Carolina State University Libraries in partnership with the North Carolina Center for Geographic Information and Analysis.

Since the inaugural eight projects were launched, the NDIIPP has collaborated with over 300 partners (as of March 2013). There are eight consortial partnerships comprising 33 institutions that are selecting, collecting, and preserving specific types of digital content:

- Data-PASS
- Dot Com Archive
- ECHO DEPository
- International Internet Preservation Consortium
- MetaArchive Cooperative
- National Geospatial Digital Archive
- North Carolina Geospatial Data Archiving Project
- Web at Risk

== National significance ==
With the rapid growth of the Internet and the World Wide Web, digital has become the principal medium to create, distribute, and store content, from text to motion pictures to recorded sound. Digital content now embodies much of the nation's intellectual, social, and cultural history. Because digital materials can be so easily altered, corrupted, or lost, these materials must be saved now if they are to remain available to today's and tomorrow's generations.

NDIIPP provided a national focus on important policy, standards, and technical components necessary to preserve digital content. Investments in modeling and testing various options and technical solutions took place over several years, resulting in recommendations to the U.S. Congress about the most viable and sustainable options for long-term preservation, copyright law in the context of digital preservation, and other issues.

In 2008, NDIIPP was the United States author for a four-nation recommendation (United States, Australia, United Kingdom, and the Netherlands) to establish laws to support digital preservation, particularly for materials at risk of being lost. That report summarized the state of digital preservation in each country at the time and highlighted relevant existing law for each country.

NDIIPP kickstarted the Library's efforts to advice individuals on personal digital archiving. This resulted in an e-book on the topic and the seeds of the current Library of Congress website on Personal Digital Archiving.

NDIIPP managed the Congressional appropriation to kick-start many important digital preservation endeavors, some in the Digital preservation partnership projects section. Two others of note were issues that had some prior development but were realized fully with the assistance of NDIIPP funding. The first technology was LOCKSS, a tool for digital preservation of scholarly articles and other digital formats. The second was a pilot project for archiving digital content from the WNET Public Broadcasting station, the Preserving Digital Public Television Project. That project evolved into today's American Archive of Public Broadcasting.

In keeping with the mission of the NDIIPP, they are working with over 1,400 collections globally to preserve institution's at-risk digital content. The collection's content ranges from Arts and Culture, Religion and Philosophy, Social Sciences, and World History and Cultures. The Library of Congress provides a full list of the collections as well as an interactive map of the collections' geographical location.
