= List of executive actions by George W. Bush =

The president of the United States may take any of several kinds of executive actions.

Executive orders are issued to help officers and agencies of the executive branch manage the operations within the federal government itself. Presidential memoranda are closely related, and have the force of law on the Executive Branch, but are generally considered less prestigious. Presidential memoranda do not have an established process for issuance, and unlike executive orders, they are not numbered. A presidential determination results in an official policy or position of the executive branch of the United States government. A presidential proclamation is a statement issued by a president on a matter of public policy, under specific authority granted to the president by Congress, typically on a matter of widespread interest. Administrative orders are signed documents such as notices, letters, and orders, that can be issued to conduct administrative operations of the federal government. A presidential notice or a presidential sequestration order can also be issued.

Listed below are executive orders numbered 13198–13488, presidential memoranda, presidential proclamations, presidential determinations, and presidential notices signed by United States President George W. Bush (2001–2009).

== Executive orders ==
=== 2001 ===
Rel #	Abs #	Title/Description	Date signed	Date published	FR Citation	FR Doc #	Ref.
1	13198^{3}	Agency Responsibilities With Respect to Faith- Based and Community Initiatives	Jan 29, 2001	Jan 31, 2001	66 FR 8497	01-2851	
2	13199^{4}	Establishment of White House Office of Faith- Based and Community Initiatives	Jan 29, 2001	Jan 31, 2001	66 FR 8499	01-2852	
3	13200^{5}	Further Amendment to Executive Order 13035, President's Information Technology Advisory Committee	Feb 11, 2001	Feb 14, 2001	66 FR 10183	01-3883	
4	13201^{6}	Notification of Employee Rights Concerning Payment of Union Dues or Fees	Feb 17, 2001	Feb 22, 2001	66 FR 11221	01-4621	
5	13202	Preservation of Open Competition and Government Neutrality Towards Government Contractors' Labor Relations on Federal and Federally Funded Construction Projects	Feb 17, 2001	Feb 22, 2001	66 FR 11225	01-4622	
6	13203^{7}	Revocation of Executive Order and Presidential Memorandum Concerning Labor-Management Partnerships	Feb 17, 2001	Feb 22, 2001	66 FR 11227	01-4623	
7	13204^{8}	Revocation of Executive Order on Nondisplacement of Qualified Workers Under Certain Contracts	Feb 17, 2001	Feb 22, 2001	66 FR 11228	01-4624	
8	13205	Establishing an Emergency Board To Investigate a Dispute Between Northwest Airlines, Inc., and Its Employees Represented by the Aircraft Mechanics Fraternal Association	Mar 9, 2001	Mar 14, 2001	66 FR 15011	01-6558	
9	13206^{9}	Termination of Emergency Authority for Certain Export Controls	Apr 4, 2001	Apr 9, 2001	66 FR 18397	01-8835	
10	13207^{10}	Further Amendment to Executive Order 10000, Regulations Governing Additional Compensation and Credit Granted Certain Employees of the Federal Government Serving Outside the United States	Apr 5, 2001	Apr 9, 2001	66 FR 18399	01-8836	
11	13208^{11}	Amendment to Executive Order 13202, Preservation of Open Competition and Government Neutrality Towards Government Contractors' Labor Relations on Federal and Federally Funded Construction Projects	Apr 6, 2001	Apr 9, 2001	66 FR 18399	01-9086	
12	13209^{12}	Amendment to Executive Order 13183, Establishment of the President's Task Force on Puerto Rico's Status.	Apr 30, 2001	May 2, 2001	66 FR 22105	01-11210	
13	13210^{13}	President's Commission To Strengthen Social Security	May 2, 2001	May 4, 2001	66 FR 22105	01-11505	
14	13211	Actions Concerning Regulations That Significantly Affect Energy Supply, Distribution, or Use	May 18, 2001	May 22, 2001	66 FR 28355	01-13116	
15	13212^{14}	Actions To Expedite Energy-Related Projects	May 18, 2001	May 22, 2001	66 FR 28357	01-13117	
16	13213^{15}	Additional Measures With Respect To Prohibiting the Importation of Rough Diamonds From Sierra Leone	May 22, 2001	May 24, 2001	66 FR 28829	01-13381	
17	13214^{13}	President's Task Force To Improve Health Care Delivery for Our Nation's Veterans	May 28, 2001	May 31, 2001	66 FR 29447	01-13869	
18	13215^{16}	Further Amendment to Executive Order 13035, President's Information Technology Advisory Committee	May 31, 2001	Jun 5, 2001	66 FR 30285	01-14319	
19	13216^{17}	Amendment to Executive Order 13125, Increasing Participation of Asian Americans and Pacific Islanders in Federal Programs	Jun 6, 2001	Jun 11, 2001	66 FR 31373	01-14862	
20	13217	Community-Based Alternatives for Individuals With Disabilities	Jun 18, 2001	Jun 21, 2001	66 FR 33155	01-15758	
21	13218^{18}	21st Century Workforce Initiative	Jun 20, 2001	Jun 22, 2001	66 FR 33627	01-15958	
22	13219^{19}	Blocking Property of Persons Who Threaten International Stabilization Efforts in the Western Balkans	Jun 26, 2001	Jun 29, 2001	66 FR 34775	01-16668	
23	13220	Waiver Under the Trade Act of 1974 With Respect to the Republic of Belarus	Jul 2, 2001	Jul 5, 2001	66 FR 35527	01-17041	
24	13221	Energy Efficient Standby Power Devices	Jul 31, 2001	Aug 2, 2001	66 FR 40571	01-19562	
25	13222^{20}	Continuation of Export Control Regulations	Aug 17, 2001	Aug 22, 2001	66 FR 44025	01-21338	
26	13223^{21}	Ordering the Ready Reserve of the Armed Forces to Active Duty and Delegating Certain Authorities to the Secretary of Defense and the Secretary of Transportation	Sep 14, 2001	Sep 18, 2001	66 FR 48201	01-23359	
27	13224^{22}	Blocking property and prohibiting transactions with persons who commit, threaten to commit, or support terrorism	Sep 23, 2001	Sep 25, 2001	66 FR 49079	01-24205	
28	13225^{23}	Continuance of Certain Federal Advisory Committees	Sep 28, 2001	Oct 3, 2001	66 FR 50291	01-24917	
29	13226^{24}	President's Council of Advisors on Science and Technology	Sep 30, 2001	Oct 3, 2001	66 FR 50523	01-24983	
30	13227^{25}	President's Commission on Excellence in Special Education	Oct 2, 2001	Oct 5, 2001	66 FR 51289	01-25344	
31	13228^{26}	Establishing the Office of Homeland Security and the Homeland Security Council	Oct 8, 2001	Oct 10, 2001	66 FR 51812	01-25677	
32	13229^{27}	Amendment to Executive Order 13045, Extending the Task Force on Environmental Health Risks and Safety Risks to Children	Oct 9, 2001	Oct 11, 2001	66 FR 52013	01-25788	
33	13230^{28}	President's Advisory Commission on Educational Excellence for Hispanic Americans	Oct 12, 2001	Oct 17, 2001	66 FR 52841	01-26339	
34	13231^{29}	Critical Infrastructure Protection in the Information Age	Oct 16, 2001	Oct 18, 2001	66 FR 53063	01-26509	
35	13232^{30}	Further Amendment to Executive Order 10789, as Amended, To Authorize the Department of Health and Human Services To Exercise Certain Contracting Authority in Connection With National Defense Functions	Oct 20, 2001	Oct 24, 2001	66 FR 53941	01-26990	
36	13233^{31}	Further implementation of the Presidential Records Act	Nov 1, 2001	Nov 5, 2001	66 FR 56025	01-27917	
37	13234^{32}	Presidential Task Force on Citizen Preparedness in the war on terrorism	Nov 9, 2001	Nov 15, 2001	66 FR 57355	01-28762	
38	13235^{33}	National Emergency Construction Authority	Nov 16, 2001	Nov 20, 2001	66 FR 58343	01-29219	
39	13236	Waiver of Dual Compensation Provisions of the Central Intelligence Agency Retirement Act of 1964	Nov 27, 2001	Nov 29, 2001	66 FR 59671	01-29831	
40	13237^{34}	Creation of the President's Council on Bioethics	Nov 28, 2001	Nov 30, 2001	66 FR 59851	01-29948	
41	13238^{35}	Closing of Federal Government Executive Departments and Agencies on Monday, Dec 24, 2001	Dec 5, 2001	Dec 10, 2001	66 FR 63903	01-30624	
42	13239	Designation of Afghanistan and the Airspace Above as a Combat Zone	Dec 12, 2001	Dec 14, 2001	66 FR 64907	01-31119	
43	13240^{36}	Council of Europe in Respect of the Group of States Against Corruption	Dec 18, 2001	Dec 21, 2001	66 FR 64907	01-31665	
44	13241	Providing an Order of Succession Within the Department of Agriculture	Dec 18, 2001	Dec 21, 2001	66 FR 66258	01-31666	
45	13242^{37}	Providing an Order of Succession Within the Department of Commerce	Dec 18, 2001	Dec 21, 2001	66 FR 66260	01-31667	
46	13243^{38}	Providing an Order of Succession Within the Department of Housing and Urban Development	Dec 18, 2001	Dec 21, 2001	66 FR 66262	01-31668	
47	13244^{39}	Providing an Order of Succession Within the Department of the Interior	Dec 18, 2001	Dec 21, 2001	66 FR 66267	01-31669	
48	13245^{40}	Providing an Order of Succession Within the Department of Labor	Dec 18, 2001	Dec 21, 2001	66 FR 66268	01-31670	
49	13246^{41}	Providing an Order of Succession Within the Department of the Treasury	Dec 18, 2001	Dec 21, 2001	66 FR 66270	01-31671	
50	13247^{42}	Providing an Order of Succession Within the Department of Veterans Affairs	Dec 18, 2001	Dec 21, 2001	66 FR 66271	01-31672	
51	13248	Establishing an Emergency Board to Investigate a Dispute Between United Airlines, Inc., and Its Mechanics and Related Employees Represented by the International Association of Machinists and Aerospace Workers	Dec 20, 2001	Dec 27, 2001	66 FR 66705	01-31959	
52	13249^{43}	Adjustments of Certain Rates of Pay	Dec 28, 2001	Jan 7, 2002	67 FR 639	02-448	

=== 2002 ===
Rel #	Abs #	Title/Description	Date signed	Date published	FR Citation	FR Doc #	Ref.
53	13250^{44}	Providing an Order of Succession Within the Department of Health and Human Services	Dec 28, 2001	Jan 11, 2002	67 FR 1597	02-917	
54	13251^{45}	Providing an Order of Succession Within the Department of State	Dec 28, 2001	Jan 11, 2002	67 FR 1599	02-918	
55	13252^{46}	Exclusions From the Federal Labor-Management Relations Program	Jan 7, 2002	Jan 11, 2002	67 FR 1601	02-919	
56	13253^{22}	Amendment to Executive Order 13223 Ordering the Ready Reserve of the Armed Forces to Active Duty and Delegating Certain Authorities to the Secretary of Defense and the Secretary of Transportation	Jan 16, 2002	Jan 18, 2002	67 FR 2791	02-1594	
57	13254	Establishing the USA Freedom Corps	Jan 29, 2002	Feb 1, 2002	67 FR 4869	02-2638	
58	13255^{26}	Amendment to Executive Order 13227, President's Commission on Excellence in Special Education	Feb 6, 2002	Feb 8, 2002	67 FR 6157	02-3337	
59	13256^{47}	President's Board of Advisors on Historically Black Colleges and Universities	Feb 12, 2002	Feb 14, 2002	67 FR 6823	02-3826	
60	13257^{48}	President's Interagency Task Force to Monitor and Combat Trafficking in Persons	Feb 13, 2002	Feb 19, 2002	67 FR 7259	02-4071	
61	13258^{49}	Amending Executive Order 12866 on Regulatory Planning and Review	Feb 26, 2002	Feb 28, 2002	67 FR 9385	02-5069	
62	13259	Designation of Public International Organizations for Purposes of the Securities Exchange Act of 1934 and the Foreign Corrupt Practices Act of 1977	Mar 19, 2002	Mar 21, 2002	67 FR 13239	02-07085	
63	13260	Establishing the President's Homeland Security Advisory Council and Senior Advisory Committees for Homeland Security	Mar 19, 2002	Mar 21, 2002	67 FR 13241	02-07086	
64	13261^{50}	Providing an Order of Succession in the Environmental Protection Agency and Amending Certain Orders on Succession	Mar 19, 2002	Mar 21, 2002	67 FR 13243	02-7087	
65	13262^{51}	2002 Amendments to the Manual for Courts-Martial, United States	Apr 11, 2002	Apr 17, 2002	67 FR 18773	02-9536	
66	13263^{52}	President's New Freedom Commission on Mental Health	Apr 29, 2002	May 3, 2002	67 FR 22337	02-11166	
67	13264^{53}	Amendment to Executive Order 13180, Air Traffic Performance-Based Organization	Jun 4. 2002	Jun 7, 2002	67 FR 39243	02-14497	
68	13265^{54}	President's Council on Physical Fitness and Sports	Jun 6, 2002	Jun 11, 2002	67 FR 39841	02-14807	
69	13266	Activities to Promote Personal Fitness	Jun 20, 2002	Jun 24, 2002	67 FR 42467	02-16040	
70	13267	Establishing a Transition Planning Office for the Department of Homeland Security Within the Office of Management and Budget	Jun 20, 2002	Jun 24, 2002	67 FR 42469	02-16041	
71	13268^{55}	Termination of Emergency With Respect to the Taliban and Amendment of Executive Order 13224 of Sep 23, 2001	Jul 2, 2002	Jul 3, 2002	67 FR 44751	02-16951	
72	13269	Expedited Naturalization of Aliens and Noncitizen Nationals Serving in an Active-Duty Status During the War on Terrorism	Jul 3, 2002	Jul 8, 2002	67 FR 45287	02-17273	
73	13270^{56}	Tribal colleges and universities	Jul 3, 2002	Jul 8, 2002	67 FR 45288	02-17274	
74	13271^{57}	Establishment of the Corporate Fraud Task Force	Jul 9, 2002	Jul 11, 2002	67 FR 46091	02-17640	
75	13272^{58}	Proper Consideration of Small Entities in Agency Rulemaking	Aug 13, 2002	Aug 16, 2002	67 FR 53461	02-21056	
76	13273^{59}	Further Amending Executive Order 10173, as Amended, Prescribing Regulations Relating to the Safeguarding of Vessels, Harbors, Ports, and Waterfront Facilities of the United States	Aug 21, 2002	Sep 3, 2002	67 FR 56215	02-22526	
77	13274	Environmental Stewardship and Transportation Infrastructure Project Reviews	Sep 18, 2002	Sep 23, 2002	67 FR 59449	02-24252	
78	13275	Creating a Board of Inquiry to Report on Certain Labor Disputes Affecting the Maritime Industry of the United States	Oct 7, 2002	Oct 9, 2002	67 FR 62869	02-25900	
79	13276^{60}	Delegation of Responsibilities Concerning Undocumented Aliens Interdicted or Intercepted in the Caribbean Region	Nov 15, 2002	Nov 19, 2002	67 FR 69985	02-29580	
80	13277^{61}	Delegation of Certain Authorities and Assignment of Certain Functions Under the Trade Act of 2002	Nov 19, 2002	Nov 21, 2002	67 FR 70305	02-29832	
81	13278^{62}	President's Commission on the United States Postal Service	Dec 11, 2002	Dec 13, 2002	67 FR 76671	02-31624	
82	13279^{63}	Equal Protection of the Laws for Faith-Based and Community Organizations	Dec 12, 2002	Dec 16, 2002	67 FR 77141	02-31831	
83	13280	Responsibilities of the Department of Agriculture and the Agency for International Development With Respect to Faith-Based and Community Initiatives	Dec 12, 2002	Dec 16, 2002	67 FR 77145	02-31832	
84	13281	Half-Day Closing of Executive Departments and Agencies of the Federal Government on Tuesday, Dec 24, 2002	Dec 19, 2002	Dec 23, 2002	67 FR 78319	02-32518	
85	13282^{64}	Adjustments of Certain Rates of Pay	Dec 31, 2002	Jan 8, 2003	68 FR 1133	03-464	

=== 2003 ===
Rel #	Abs #	Title/Description	Date signed	Date published	FR Citation	FR Doc #	Ref.
86	13283^{65}	Establishing the Office of Global Communications	Jan 21, 2003	Jan 24, 2003	68 FR 3371	03-1798	
87	13284^{66}	Amendment of Executive Orders, and Other Actions, in Connection With the Establishment of the Department of Homeland Security	Jan 23, 2003	Jan 28, 2003	68 FR 4075	03-2069	
88	13285^{67}	President's Council on Service and Civic Participation	Jan 29, 2003	Feb 3, 2003	68 FR 5203	03-2606	
89	13286^{57}	Amendment of Executive Orders, and Other Actions, in Connection With the Transfer of Certain Functions to the Secretary of Homeland Security	Feb 38, 2003	Mar 5, 2003	68 FR 10619	03-5343	
90	13287	Preserve America	Mar 3, 2003	Mar 5, 2003	68 FR 10635	03-05344	
91	13288^{68}	Blocking Property of Persons Undermining Democratic Processes or Institutions in Zimbabwe	Mar 6, 2003	Mar 10, 2003	68 FR 11457	03-5848	
92	13289^{69}	Establishing the Global War on Terrorism Medals	Mar 12, 2003	Mar 14, 2003	68 FR 12567	03-6445	
93	13290^{70}	Confiscating and Vesting Certain Iraqi Property	Mar 20, 2003	Mar 24, 2003	68 FR 14307	03-7160	
94	13291^{71}	Further Adjustment of Certain Rates of Pay	Mar 21, 2003	Mar 25, 2003	68 FR 14525	03-7313	
95	13292^{72}	Further amendment to Executive Order 12958, as amended, classified national security information	Mar 25, 2003	Mar 28, 2003	68 FR 15315	03-7736	
96	13293^{73}	Amendment to Executive Order 10448, Establishing the National Defense Service Medal	Mar 28, 2003	Apr 1, 2003	68 FR 15917	03-8108	
97	13294^{74}	Regulations Relating to Hazardous Duty Incentive Pay, Aviation Career Incentive Pay, and Submarine Duty Incentive Pay	Mar 28, 2003	Apr 1, 2003	68 FR 15919	03-8109	
98	13295^{75}	Revised List of Quarantinable Communicable Diseases	Apr 4, 2003	Apr 9, 2003	68 FR 17255	03-8832	
99	13296^{76}	Amendments to Executive Order 13045, Protection of Children From Environmental Health Risks and Safety Risks	Apr 18, 2003	Apr 23, 2003	68 FR 19931	03-10194	
100	13297	Applying the Federal Physicians Comparability Allowance Amendments of 2000 to Participants in the Foreign Service Retirement and Disability System, the Foreign Service Pension System, and the Central Intelligence Agency Retirement and Disability System	Apr 23, 2003	Apr 28, 2003	68 FR 22565	03-10606	
101	13298^{77}	Termination of Emergency With Respect to the Actions and Policies of UNITA and Revocation of Related Executive Orders	May 6, 2003	May 8, 2003	68 FR 24857	03-11713	
102	13299^{78}	Interagency Group on Insular Areas	May 8, 2003	May 12, 2003	68 FR 25477	03-11969	
103	13300	Facilitating the Administration of Justice in the Federal Courts	May 9, 2003	May 13, 2003	68 FR 25807	03-12071	
104	13301^{79}	Increasing the Number of Members on the Intelligence Oversight Board	May 14, 2003	May 19, 2003	68 FR 26981	03-12661	
105	13302^{80}	Amending Executive Order 13212, Actions to Expedite Energy-Related Projects	May 15, 2003	May 20, 2003	68 FR 27429	03-12766	
106	13303^{81}	Protecting the Development Fund for Iraq and certain other property in which Iraq has an interest	May 22, 2003	May 28, 2003	68 FR 31931	03-13412	
107	13304^{82}	Termination of National Emergencies With Respect to Yugoslavia and Modification of Executive Order 13219 of Jun 26, 2001	May 28, 2003	May 29, 2003	68 FR 32315	03-13694	
108	13305^{83}	Extension of the President's Information Technology Advisory Committee and the President's Council of Advisors on Science and Technology	May 28, 2003	May 30, 2003	68 FR 32323	03-13750	
109	13306	Establishing the Bob Hope American Patriot Award	May 28, 2003	Jun 3, 2003	68 FR 33337	03-14116	
110	13307	European Central Bank	May 29, 2003	Jun 3, 2003	68 FR 33338	03-14117	
111	13308^{84}	Further Amendment to Executive Order 12580, as Amended, Superfund Implementation	Jun 20, 2003	Jun 24, 2003	68 FR 37691	03-16102	
112	13309^{85}	Amendments to Executive Order 12994, and renaming the President's Committee on Mental Retardation as the President's Committee for People with Intellectual Disabilities	Jul 25, 2003	Jul 30, 2003	68 FR 44851	03-19572	
113	13310^{86}	Blocking Property of the Government of Burma and Prohibiting Certain Transactions	Jul 28, 2003	Jul 30, 2003	68 FR 44853	03-19573	
114	13311^{87}	Homeland Security Information Sharing	Jul 29, 2003	Jul 31, 2003	68 FR 45149	03-19675	
115	13312^{88}	Implementing the Clean Diamond Trade Act	Jul 29, 2003	Jul 31, 2003	68 FR 45151	03-19676	
116	13313	Delegation of Certain Congressional Reporting Functions	Jul 31, 2003	Aug 5, 2003	68 FR 46073	03-20013	
117	13314	Waiver Under the Trade Act of 1974 With Respect to Turkmenistan	Aug 8, 2003	Aug 13, 2003	68 FR 48249	03-20764	
118	13315^{89}	Blocking Property of the Former Iraqi Regime, Its Senior Officials and Their Family Members, and Taking Certain Other Actions	Aug 13, 2003	Sep 3, 2003	68 FR 52315	03-22543	
119	13316^{90}	Continuance of Certain Federal Advisory Committees	Sep 17, 2003	Sep 23, 2003	68 FR 55255	03-24217	
120	13317^{91}	Volunteers for Prosperity	Sep 25, 2003	Sep 30, 2003	68 FR 56515	03-24919	
121	13318^{92}	Presidential Management Fellows Program	Nov 21, 2003	Nov 25, 2003	68 FR 66317	03-29644	
122	13319^{93}	Amendment to Executive Order 13183, Establishment of the President's Task Force on Puerto Rico's Status	Dec 3, 2003	Dec 8, 2003	68 FR 68233	03-30513	
123	13320^{94}	Closing of Executive Departments and Agencies of the Federal Government on Friday, Dec 26, 2003	Dec 9, 2003	Dec 12, 2003	68 FR 69295	03-30913	
124	13321^{95}	Appointments During National Emergency	Dec 17, 2003	Dec 23, 2003	68 FR 74465	03-31594	
125	13322^{96}	Adjustments of Certain Rates of Pay	Dec 30, 2003	Jan 2, 2004	69 FR 231	03-32328	
126	13323	Assignment of Functions Relating to Arrivals in and Departures From the United States	Dec 30, 2003	Jan 2, 2004	69 FR 241	03-32332	

=== 2004 ===
Rel #	Abs #	Title/Description	Date signed	Date published	FR Citation	FR Doc #	Ref.
127	13324^{15}	Termination of National Emergency With Respect to Sierra Leone and Liberia	Jan 15, 2004	Jan 20, 2004	69 FR 2823	04-1322	
128	13325^{97}	Amendment to Executive Order 12293, the Foreign Service of the United States	Jan 23, 2004	Jan 28, 2004	69 FR 4217	04-1941	
129	13326^{98}	President's Commission on implementation of United States space exploration policy	Jan 27, 2004	Feb 3, 2004	69 FR 5255	04-2408	
130	13327^{99}	Federal Real Property Asset Management	Feb 4, 2004	Feb 6, 2004	69 FR 5897	04-2773	
131	13328^{100}	Commission on the Intelligence Capabilities of the United States Regarding Weapons of Mass Destruction	Feb 6, 2004	Feb 11, 2004	69 FR 6901	04-3170	
132	13329^{101}	Encouraging Innovation in Manufacturing	Feb 24, 2004	Feb 26, 2004	69 FR 9181	04-4436	
133	13330^{102}	Human Service Transportation Coordination	Feb 24, 2004	Feb 26, 2004	69 FR 9185	04-4451	
134	13331	National and Community Service Programs	Feb 27, 2004	Mar 3, 2004	69 FR 9911	04-4884	
135	13332^{103}	Further Adjustment of Certain Rates of Pay	Mar 3, 2004	Mar 8, 2004	69 FR 10891	04-5322	
136	13333^{48}	Amending Executive Order 13257 to Implement the Trafficking Victims Protection Reauthorization Act of 2003	Mar 18, 2004	Mar 23, 2004	69 FR 13455	04-66220	
137	13334^{104}	Establishing an Emergency Board to Investigate a Dispute Between the Southeastern Pennsylvania Transportation Authority and Its Conductors Represented by the United Transportation Union	Apr 10, 2004	Apr 14, 2004	69 FR 19917	04-8616	
138	13335	Incentives for the Use of Health Information Technology and Establishing the Position of the National Health Information Technology Coordinator	Apr 27, 2004	Apr 30, 2004	69 FR 24059	04-10024	
139	13336^{105}	American Indian and Alaska Native Education	Apr 30, 2004	May 5, 2004	69 FR 25295	04-10377	
140	13337^{106}	Issuance of Permits With Respect to Certain Energy-Related Facilities and Land Transportation Crossings on the International Boundaries of the United States	Apr 30, 2004	May 5, 2004	69 FR 25299	04-10378	
141	13338^{107}	Blocking Property of Certain Persons and Prohibiting the Export of Certain Goods to Syria	May 11, 2004	May 13, 2004	69 FR 26751	04-11058	
142	13339^{108}	Increasing Economic Opportunity and Business Participation of Asian Americans and Pacific Islanders	May 13, 2004	May 17, 2004	69 FR 28037	04-11271	
143	13340	Establishment of Great Lakes Interagency Task Force and Promotion of a Regional Collaboration of National Significance for the Great Lakes	May 18, 2004	May 20, 2004	69 FR 29043	04-11592	
144	13341^{109}	Further Amendment to Executive Order 11023, Providing for the Performance by the Secretary of Commerce of Certain Functions Relating to the National Oceanic and Atmospheric Administration	May 20, 2004	May 25, 2004	69 FR 29843	04-11991	
145	13342	Responsibilities of the Departments of Commerce and Veterans Affairs and the Small Business Administration With Respect to Faith-Based and Community Initiatives	Jun 1, 2004	Jun 3, 2004	69 FR 31059	04-12745	
146	13343^{110}	Providing for the Closing of Government Departments and Agencies on Jun 11, 2004	Jun 6, 2004	Jun 8, 2004	69 FR 32245	04-13123	
147	13344^{110}	Amending Executive Order 13261 on the Order of Succession in the Environmental Protection Agency	Jun 7, 2004	Jun 9, 2004	69 FR 41747	04-15787	
148	13345^{111}	Assigning Foreign Affairs Functions and Implementing the Enterprise for the Americas Initiative and the Tropical Forest Conservation Act of 1998	Jul 8, 2004	Jul 13, 2004	69 FR 41901	04-15933	
149	13346^{112}	Delegation of Certain Waiver, Determination, Certification, Recommendation, and Reporting Functions	Jul 8, 2004	Jul 13, 2004	69 FR 41905	04-15934	
150	13347	Individuals With Disabilities in Emergency Preparedness	Jul 22, 2004	Jul 26, 2004	69 FR 44573	04-17150	
151	13348^{113}	Blocking Property of Certain Persons and Prohibiting the Importation of Certain Goods from Liberia	Jul 22, 2004	Jul 27, 2004	69 FR 44885	04-17205	
152	13349^{114}	Amending Executive Order 13326 to Designate the President's Council of Advisors on Science and Technology to Serve as the National Nanotechnology Panel	Jul 23, 2004	Jul 27, 2004	69 FR 44891	04-17204	
153	13350^{115}	Termination of Emergency Declared in Executive Order 12722 With Respect to Iraq and Modification of EO 13290, EO 13303, and EO 13315	Jul 29, 2004	Jul 30, 2004	69 FR 46055	04-17636	
154	13351^{116}	Establishing an Emergency Board to Investigate a Dispute Between the Southeastern Pennsylvania Transportation Authority and Its Conductors Represented by the United Transportation Union	Aug 9, 2004	Aug 12, 2004	69 FR 50047	04-18575	
155	13352	Facilitation of Cooperative Conservation	Aug 26, 2004	Aug 30, 2004	69 FR 52989	04-19909	
156	13353	Establishing the President's Board on Safeguarding Americans' Civil Liberties	Aug 27, 2004	Sep 1, 2004	69 FR 53585	04-20049	
157	13354^{117}	National Counterterrorism Center	Aug 27, 2004	Sep 1, 2004	69 FR 53589	04-20050	
158	13355^{118}	Strengthened Management of the Intelligence Community	Aug 27, 2004	Sep 1, 2004	69 FR 53593	04-20051	
159	13356^{119}	Strengthening the Sharing of Terrorism Information To Protect Americans	Aug 27, 2004	Sep 1, 2004	69 FR 53599	04-20052	
160	13357^{120}	Termination of Emergency Declared in Executive Order 12543 With Respect to the Policies and Actions of the Government of Libya and Revocation of Related Executive Orders	Sep 20, 2004	Sep 22, 2004	69 FR 56665	04-21411	
161	13358	Assignment of Functions Relating to Certain Appointments, Promotions, and Commissions in the Armed Forces	Sep 28, 2004	Sep 30, 2004	69 FR 58797	04-22212	
162	13359^{121}	Amendment to Executive Order 13173, Interagency Task Force on the Economic Development of the Central San Joaquin Valley	Oct 20, 2004	Oct 25, 2004	69 FR 62391	04-23994	
163	13360	Providing Opportunities for Service-Disabled Veteran Businesses to Increase Their Federal Contracting and Subcontracting	Oct 20, 2004	Oct 26, 2004	69 FR 62549	04-24098	
164	13361^{122}	Assignment of Functions Under the United States Leadership Against HIV/AIDS, Tuberculosis, and Malaria Act of 2003	Nov 16, 2004	Nov 19, 2004	69 FR 67633	04-25866	
165	13362^{123}	Designation of Additional Officers for the Department of Homeland Security Order of Succession	Nov 29, 2004	Dec 2, 2004	69 FR 70173	04-26684	
166	13363^{124}	Establishing the Afghanistan and Iraq Campaign Medals	Nov 29, 2004	Dec 2, 2004	69 FR 70175	04-26685	
167	13364^{125}	Modifying the Protection Granted to the Development Fund for Iraq and Certain Property in Which Iraq Has an Interest and Protecting the Central Bank of Iraq	Nov 29, 2004	Dec 2, 2004	69 FR 70177	04-26686	
168	13365^{126}	2004 Amendments to the Manual for Courts-Martial, United States	Dec 3, 2004	Dec 8, 2004	69 FR 71333	04-27076	
169	13366^{127}	Committee on Ocean Policy	Dec 17, 2004	Dec 21, 2004	69 FR 76591	04-28079	
170	13367	United States-Mexico Border Health Commission	Dec 21, 2004	Dec 27, 2004	69 FR 77605	04-28404	
171	13368^{128}	Adjustments of Certain Rates of Pay	Dec 30, 2004	Jan 5, 2005	70 FR 1147	05-306	

=== 2005 ===
Rel #	Abs #	Title/Description	Date signed	Date published	FR Citation	FR Doc #	Ref.
172	13369^{129}	President's Advisory Panel on Federal Tax Reform	Jan 7, 2005	Jan 12, 2005	70 FR 2323	05-771	
173	13370	Providing an Order of Succession in the Office of Management and Budget	Jan 13, 2005	Jan 19, 2005	70 FR 3137	05-1170	
174	13371^{130}	Amendments to Executive Order 13285, Relating to the President's Council on Service and Civic Participation	Jan 27, 2005	Jan 31, 2005	70 FR 5041	05-1886	
175	13372^{131}	Clarification of Certain Executive Orders Blocking Property and Prohibiting Certain Transactions	Feb 16, 2005	Feb 18, 2005	70 FR 8499	05-5097	
176	13373^{132}	Amendments to Executive Order 11926 Relating to the Vice Presidential Service Badge	Mar 10, 2005	Mar 14, 2005	70 FR 12579	05-5434	
177	13374^{133}	Amendments to Executive Order 12293 - The Foreign Service of the United States	Mar 14, 2005	Mar 17, 2005	70 FR 12961	05-6907	
178	13375^{134}	Amendment to Executive Order 13295 Relating to Certain Influenza Viruses and Quarantinable Communicable Diseases	Apr 1, 2005	Apr 5, 2005	70 FR 17299	05-6907	
179	13376^{135}	Amendments to Executive Order 12863, Relating to the President's Foreign Intelligence Advisory Board	Apr 13, 2005	Apr 18, 2005	70 FR 20261	05-7830	
180	13377^{136}	Designating the African Union as a Public International Organization Entitled To Enjoy Certain Privileges, Exemptions, and Immunities	Apr 13, 2005	Apr 18, 2005	70 FR 20263	05-7831	
181	13378^{137}	Amendments to Executive Order 12788 Relating to the Defense Economic Adjustment Program	May 12, 2005	May 17, 2005	70 FR 28413	05-9892	
182	13379^{138}	Amendment to Executive Order 13369, Relating to the President's Advisory Panel on Federal Tax Reform	Jun 16, 2005	Jun 20, 2005	70 FR 35505	05-12284	
183	13380^{139}	Implementing Amendments to Executive Order 13369 on Border Environment Cooperation Commission and North American Development Bank	Jun 17, 2005	Jun 21, 2005	70 FR 35509	05-12354	
184	13381^{140}	Strengthening Processes Relating to Determining Eligibility for Access to Classified National Security Information	Jun 27, 2005	Jun 30, 2005	70 FR 37953	05-13098	
185	13382^{141}	Blocking Property of Weapons of Mass Destruction Proliferators and Their Supporters	Jun 28, 2005	Jul 1, 2005	70 FR 38567	05-13214	
186	13383^{142}	Amending Executive Orders 12139 and 12949 in Light of Establishment of the Office of Director of National Intelligence	Jul 15, 2005	Jul 20, 2005	70 FR 41933	05-14452	
187	13384	Assignment of Functions Relating to Original Appointments as Commissioned Officers and Chief Warrant Officer Appointments in the Armed Forces	Jul 27, 2005	Jul 29, 2005	70 FR 43739	05-15160	
188	13385^{143}	Continuance of Certain Federal Advisory Committees and Amendments to and Revocation of Other Executive Orders	Sep 29, 2005	Oct 4, 2005	70 FR 57989	05-19993	
189	13386^{144}	Further Amendment to Executive Order 13369, Relating to the President's Advisory Panel on Federal Tax Reform	Sep 30, 2005	Oct 5, 2005	70 FR 58289	05-20156	
190	13387^{145}	2005 Amendments to the Manual for Courts-Martial, United States	Oct 14, 2005	Oct 18, 2005	70 FR 60697	05-20944	
191	13388^{146}	Further strengthening the sharing of terrorism Information to protect Americans	Oct 25, 2005	Oct 27, 2005	70 FR 62023	05-21571	
192	13389^{147}	Creation of the Gulf Coast Recovery and Rebuilding Council	Nov 1, 2005	Nov 4, 2005	70 FR 67325	05-22132	
193	13390^{148}	Establishment of a Coordinator of Federal Support for the Recovery and Rebuilding of the Gulf Coast Region	Nov 1, 2005	Nov 4, 2005	70 FR 67327	05-23412	
194	13391^{149}	Amendment to EO 13288, Blocking Property of Additional Persons Undermining Democratic Processes or Institutions in Zimbabwe	Nov 22, 2005	Nov 25, 2005	70 FR 71201	05-23412	
195	13392	Improving Agency Disclosure of Information	Dec 14, 2005	Dec 19, 2005	70 FR 75373	05-24255	
196	13393^{150}	Adjustments of Certain Rates of Pay	Dec 22, 2005	Dec 27, 2005	70 FR 76655	05-24596	
197	13394^{151}	Providing an Order of Succession Within the Department of Defense	Dec 22, 2005	Dec 27, 2005	70 FR 76665	05-24597	

=== 2006 ===
Rel #	Abs #	Title/Description	Date signed	Date published	FR Citation	FR Doc #	Ref.
198	13395	Designating the Global Fund to Fight AIDS, Tuberculosis and Malaria as a public international organization entitled to enjoy certain privileges, exemptions, and immunities	Jan 13, 2006	Jan 19, 2006	71 FR 3203	06-554	
199	13396	Blocking property of certain persons contributing to the conflict in Côte d'Ivoire	Feb 7, 2006	Feb 10, 2006	71 FR 7389	06-1316	
200	13397	Responsibilities of the Department of Homeland Security with respect to faith-based and community initiatives	Mar 6, 2006	Mar 9, 2006	71 FR 12275	06-2362	
201	13398	National Mathematics Advisory Panel	Apr 18, 2006	Apr 21, 2006	71 FR 20519	06-3865	
202	13399^{152}	Blocking Property of Additional Persons in Connection With the National Emergency With Respect to Syria	Apr 25, 2006	Apr 28, 2006	71 FR 25059	06-4085	
203	13400^{153}	Blocking Property of Persons in Connection With the Conflict in Sudan's Darfur Region	Apr 26, 2006	May 1, 2006	71 FR 25483	06-4121	
204	13401^{154}	Responsibilities of Federal Departments and Agencies With Respect to Volunteer Community Service	Apr 27, 2006	May 1, 2006	71 FR 25737	06-4132	
205	13402^{155}	Strengthening Federal Efforts to Protect Against Identity Theft	May 10, 2006	May 15, 2006	71 FR 27945	06-4552	
206	13403^{156}	Amendments to Executive Orders 11030, 13279, 13339, 13381, and 13389, and Revocation of Executive Order 13011	May 12, 2006	May 16, 2006	71 FR 28543	06-4652	
207	13404	Task Force on New Americans	Jun 7, 2006	Jun 12, 2006	71 FR 33953	06-5351	
208	13405^{157}	Blocking Property of Certain Persons Undermining Democratic Processes or Institutions in Belarus	Jun 16, 2006	Jun 20, 2006	71 FR 35485	06-5592	
209	13406^{158}	Protecting the Property Rights of the American People	Jun 23, 2006	Jun 28, 2006	71 FR 36973	06-5828	
210	13407^{159}	Public Alert and Warning System	Jun 26, 2006	Jun 28, 2006	71 FR 36975	06-5829	
211	13408^{160}	Amending Executive Order 13381, as Amended, to Extend its Duration by One Year	Jun 29, 2006	Jul 3, 2006	71 FR 37807	06-5984	
212	13409	Establishing an Emergency Board to Investigate a Dispute Between Southeastern Pennsylvania Transportation Authority and its Locomotive Engineers Represented by the Brotherhood of Locomotive Engineers and Trainmen	Jul 3, 2006	Jul 7, 2006	71 FR 38511	06-6101	
213	13410	Promoting Quality and Efficient Health Care in Federal Government Administered or Sponsored Health Care Programs	Aug 22, 2006	Aug 28, 2006	71 FR 51089	06-7220	
214	13411	Improving Assistance for Disaster Victims	Aug 29, 2006	Sep 6, 2006	71 FR 52729	06-7492	
215	13412^{161}	Blocking Property of and Prohibiting Transactions with the Government of Sudan	Oct 13, 2006	Oct 17, 2006	71 FR 61369	06-8769	
216	13413^{162}	Blocking Property of Certain Persons Contributing to the Conflict in the Democratic Republic of the Congo	Oct 27, 2006	Oct 31, 2006	71 FR 64105	06-9020	
217	13414^{163}	Amendment to Executive Order 13402, Strengthening Federal Efforts to Protect Against Identity Theft	Nov 3, 2006	Nov 8, 2006	71 FR 65365	06-9148	
218	13415^{164}	Assignment of Certain Pay-Related Functions	Dec 1, 2006	Dec 5, 2006	71 FR 70641	06-9561	
219	13416^{165}	Strengthening Surface Transportation Security	Dec 5, 2006	Dec 7, 2006	71 FR 71033	06-9619	
220	13417	Establishing an Emergency Board to Investigate Disputes Between Metro-North Railroad and Certain of Its Employees Represented by Certain Labor Organizations	Dec 6, 2006	Dec 8, 2006	71 FR 71459	06-9632	
221	13418^{166}	Amendment to Executive Order 13317, Volunteers for Prosperity	Dec 14, 2006	Dec 18, 2006	71 FR 75647	06-9770	
222	13419^{167}	National Aeronautics Research and Development	Dec 20, 2006	Dec 26, 2006	71 FR 77565	06-9895	
223	13420^{168}	Adjustments of Certain Rates of Pay	Dec 21, 2006	Dec 26, 2006	71 FR 77571	06-9896	
224	13421^{169}	Providing for the Closing of Government Departments and Agencies on Jan 2, 2007	Dec 28, 2006	Jan 4, 2007	72 FR 425	06-9993	

=== 2007 ===
Rel #	Abs #	Title/Description	Date signed	Date published	FR Citation	FR Doc #	Ref.
225	13422^{170}	Further Amendment to Executive Order 12866 on Regulatory Planning and Review	Jan 18, 2007	Jan 23, 2007	72 FR 2763	07-293	
226	13423^{171}	Strengthening Federal Environmental, Energy, and Transportation Management	Jan 24, 2007	Jan 26, 2007	72 FR 3919	07-374	
227	13424^{172}	Further Amendment to Executive Order 13285, Relating to the President's Council on Service and Civic Participation	Jan 26, 2007	Jan 30, 2007	72 FR 4409	07-419	
228	13425^{173}	Trial of Alien Unlawful Enemy Combatants by Military Commission	Feb 14, 2007	Feb 20, 2007	72 FR 7737	07-780	
229	13426	Establishing a Commission on Care for America's Returning Wounded Warriors and a Task Force on Returning Global War on Terror Heroes	Mar 6, 2007	Mar 8, 2007	72 FR 10589	07-1137	
230	13427	Extending Privileges and Immunities to the Permanent Observer Mission of the Holy See to the United Nations	Mar 7, 2007	Mar 9, 2007	72 FR 10879	07-1152	
231	13428^{174}	Renaming a National Forest in the Commonwealth of Puerto Rico	Apr 2, 2007	Apr 4, 2007	72 FR 16693	07-1704	
232	13429^{175}	Establishing an Emergency Board to Investigate a Dispute Between Metro-North Railroad and Its Maintenance of Way Employees Represented by the International Brotherhood of Teamsters	Apr 4, 2007	Apr 10, 2007	72 FR 18101	07-1816	
233	13430^{176}	2007 Amendments to the Manual for Courts-Martial, United States	Apr 18, 2007	Apr 23, 2007	72 FR 20213	07-2027	
234	13431	Establishment of Temporary Organization to Facilitate United States Government Assistance for Transition in Iraq	Apr 18, 2007	Apr 23, 2007	72 FR 26709	07-2367	
235	13432^{177}	Cooperation Among Agencies in Protecting the Environment With Respect to Greenhouse Gas Emissions From Motor Vehicles, Nonroad Vehicles, and Nonroad Engines	May 14, 2007	May 16, 2007	72 FR 27717	07-2462	
236	13433	Protecting American Taxpayers From Payment of Contingency Fees	May 16, 2007	May 18, 2007	72 FR 28441	07-2518	
237	13434	National Security Professional Development	May 17, 2007	May 22, 2007	72 FR 28583	07-2570	
238	13435^{178}	Expanding Approved Stem Cell Lines in Ethically Responsible Ways	Jun 20, 2007	Jun 22, 2007	72 FR 34591	07-3112	
239	13436^{179}	Further Amending Executive Order 13381, as Amended, to Extend Its Duration by One Year	Jun 28, 2007	Jul 3, 2007	72 FR 36337	07-3258	
240	13437	Waiver Under the Trade Act of 1974 With Respect to Turkmenistan	Jun 28, 2007	Jul 3, 2007	72 FR 36339	07-3259	
241	13438^{180}	Blocking Property of Certain Persons Who Threaten Stabilization Efforts in Iraq	Jul 17, 2007	Jul 19, 2007	72 FR 39719	07-3552	
242	13439	Establishing an Interagency Working Group on Import Safety	Jul 18, 2007	Jul 20, 2007	72 FR 40053	07-3593	
243	13440	Interpretation of the Geneva Conventions Common Article 3 as Applied to a Program of Detention and Interrogation Operated by the Central Intelligence Agency	Jul 20, 2007	Jul 24, 2007	72 FR 40707	07-3656	
244	13441^{181}	Blocking Property of Persons Undermining the Sovereignty of Lebanon or Its Democratic Processes and Institutions	Aug 1, 2007	Aug 3, 2007	72 FR 43499	07-3835	
245	13442^{182}	Amending the Order of Succession in the Department of Homeland Security	Aug 13, 2007	Aug 15, 2007	72 FR 45877	07-4023	
246	13443	Facilitation of Hunting Heritage and Wildlife Conservation	Aug 16, 2007	Aug 20, 2007	72 FR 46537	07-4115	
247	13444	Extending Privileges and Immunities to the African Union Mission to the United States	Sep 12, 2007	Sep 14, 2007	72 FR 52747	07-4600	
248	13445	Strengthening Adult Education	Sep 27, 2007	Oct 2, 2007	72 FR 56165	07-4890	
249	13446^{183}	Continuance of Certain Federal Advisory Committees and Amendments to and Revocation of Other Executive Orders	Sep 28, 2007	Oct 2, 2007	72 FR 56175	07-4906	
250	13447^{184}	Further 2007 Amendments to the Manual for Courts-Martial, United States	Sep 28, 2007	Oct 2, 2007	72 FR 56179	07-4907	
251	13448^{185}	Blocking Property and Prohibiting Certain Transactions Related to Burma	Oct 18, 2007	Oct 23, 2007	72 FR 60223	07-5270	
252	13449^{186}	Protection of Striped Bass and Red Drum Fish Populations	Oct 20, 2007	Oct 24, 2007	72 FR 60531	07-5299	
253	13450	Improving Government Program Performance	Nov 13, 2007	Nov 15, 2007	72 FR 64519	07-5726	
254	13451	Designating the ITER International Fusion Energy Organization as a Public International Organization Entitled to Enjoy Certain Privileges, Exemptions, and Immunities	Nov 19, 2007	Nov 21, 2007	72 FR 65653	07-5816	
255	13452	Establishing an Emergency Board to Investigate Disputes Between the National Railroad Passenger Corporation and Certain of Its Employees Represented by Certain Labor Organizations	Nov 28, 2007	Nov 30, 2007	72 FR 67827	07-5919	
256	13453^{187}	Closing of Executive Departments and Agencies of the Federal Government on Monday, Dec 24, 2007	Dec 6, 2007	Dec 11, 2007	72 FR 70477	07-6022	

=== 2008 ===
Rel #	Abs #	Title/Description	Date signed	Date published	FR Citation	FR Doc #	Ref.
257	13454^{188}	Adjustments of Certain Rates of Pay	Jan 4, 2008	Jan 8, 2008	73 FR 1481	08-62	
258	13455	Establishing the President's Advisory Council on Financial Literacy	Jan 23, 2008	Jan 24, 2008	73 FR 4445	08-325	
259	13456^{189}	Further Amendment of Executive Order 11858 Concerning Foreign Investment in the United States	Jan 23, 2008	Jan 25, 2008	73 FR 4677	08-360	
260	13457	Protecting American Taxpayers From Government Spending on Wasteful Earmarks	Jan 29, 2008	Feb 1, 2008	73 FR 6417	08-483	
261	13458	Implementation of the Protocol Additional to the Agreement Between the United States and the International Atomic Energy Agency for the Application of Safeguards in the United States of America	Feb 4, 2008	Feb 6, 2008	73 FR 7181	08-568	
262	13459	Improving the Coordination and Effectiveness of Youth Programs	Feb 7, 2008	Feb 12, 2008	73 FR 8003	08-658	
263	13460^{190}	Blocking Property of Additional Persons in Connection With the National Emergency With Respect to Syria	Feb 13, 2008	Feb 15, 2008	73 FR 8991	08-761	
264	13461^{191}	Providing an Order of Succession Within the Department of Health and Human Services	Feb 15, 2008	Feb 20, 2008	73 FR 9437	08-797	
265	13462^{192}	President's Intelligence Advisory Board and Intelligence Oversight Board	Feb 29, 2008	Mar 4, 2008	73 FR 11805	08-970	
266	13463^{193}	Amending Executive Orders 13389 and 13390	Apr 18, 2008	Apr 23, 2008	73 FR 22047	08-1182	
267	13464	Blocking Property and Prohibiting Certain Transactions Related to Burma	Apr 30, 2008	May 2, 2008	73 FR 24491	08-1215	
268	13465^{194}	Amending Executive Order 12989, as Amended	Jun 6, 2008	Jun 11, 2008	73 FR 33285	08-1348	
269	13466^{195}	Continuing Certain Restrictions With Respect to North Korea and North Korean Nationals	Jun 26, 2008	Jun 27, 2008	73 FR 36787	08-1399	
270	13467^{196}	Reforming Processes Related to Suitability for Government Employment, Fitness for Contractor Employees, and Eligibility for Access to Classified National Security Information	Jun 30, 2008	Jul 2, 2008	73 FR 38103	08-1409	
271	13468^{197}	2008 Amendments to the Manual for Courts-Martial, United States	Jul 24, 2008	Jul 28, 2008	73 FR 43827	08-1472	
272	13469^{198}	Blocking Property of Additional Persons Undermining Democratic Processes or Institutions in Zimbabwe	Jul 25, 2008	Jul 29, 2008	73 FR 43841	08-1480	
273	13470^{199}	Further Amendments to Executive Order 12333, United States Intelligence Activities	Jul 30, 2008	Aug 4, 2008	73 FR 45325	E8-17940	
274	13471^{200}	Further Amendments to Executive Order 13285, President's Council On Service And Civic Participation	Aug 28, 2008	Sep 2, 2008	73 FR 51209	E8-20436	
275	13472^{201}	Executive Branch Responsibilities With Respect to Orders of Succession	Sep 11, 2008	Sep 15, 2008	73 FR 53353	E8-21651	
276	13473	To Authorize Certain Noncompetitive Appointments in the Civil Service for Spouses of Certain Members of the Armed Forces	Sep 25, 2008	Sep 30, 2008	73 FR 56703	E8-23125	
277	13474^{202}	Amendments to Executive Order 12962	Sep 26, 2008	Oct 1, 2008	73 FR 57229	E8-23235	
278	13475^{203}	Further Amendments to EO12139 and EO12949 In Light of the Foreign Intelligence Surveillance Act of 1978 Amendments Act of 2008	Oct 7, 2008	Oct 10, 2008	73 FR 60095	E8-24342	
279	13476^{204}	Facilitation of a Presidential Transition	Oct 9, 2008	Oct 14, 2008	73 FR 60605	E8-24465	
280	13477	Settlement of Claims Against Libya	Oct 31, 2008	Nov 5, 2008	73 FR 65965	E8-26531	
281	13478^{205}	Amendments to Executive Order 9397 Relating to Federal Agency Use of Social Security Numbers	Nov 18, 2008	Nov 20, 2008	73 FR 70239	E8-27771	
282	13479^{206}	Transformation of the National Air Transportation System	Nov 18, 2008	Nov 20, 2008	73 FR 70241	E8-27777	
283	13480^{207}	Exclusions From the Federal Labor-Management Relations Program	Nov 26, 2008	Dec 4, 2008	73 FR 73991	E8-28912	
284	13481^{208}	Providing An Order of Succession Within the Department of Justice	Dec 4, 2008	Dec 11, 2008	73 FR 75531	E8-29564	
285	13482^{209}	Closing of Executive Departments and Agencies of the Federal Government on Friday, Dec 26, 2008	Dec 12, 2008	Dec 16, 2008	73 FR 76501	E8-30042	
286	13483^{210}	Adjustments of Certain Rates of Pay	Dec 18, 2008	Dec 23, 2008	73 FR 78587	E8-30700	

=== 2009 ===
Rel #	Abs #	Title/Description	Date signed	Date published	FR Citation	FR Doc #	Ref.
287	13484^{211}	Amending Executive Order 13241, the Order of Succession Within the Department of Agriculture	Jan 9, 2009	Jan 14, 2009	74 FR 2285	E9-811	
288	13485^{212}	Providing an Order of Succession Within the Department of Transportation, 2009	Jan 9, 2009	Jan 14, 2009	74 FR 2287	E9-814	
289	13486	Strengthening Laboratory Biosecurity in the United States	Jan 9, 2009	Jan 14, 2009	74 FR 2289	E9-818	
290	13487	Establishment of a Temporary Organization to Facilitate United States Government Support for Afghanistan	Jan 16, 2009	Jan 22, 2009	74 FR 4097	E9-1538	
291	13488^{213}	Granting Reciprocity on Excepted Service and Federal Contractor Employee Fitness and Reinvestigating Individuals in Positions of Public Trust	Jan 16, 2009	Jan 22, 2009	74 FR 4111	E9-1574	

== Presidential memoranda ==
#	Title/Description	Date signed	Date published	FR Citation	FR Doc #	Ref.
1						
2	Provision of Aviation Insurance Coverage for Commercial Air Carrier Service in Domestic and International Operations, 2005	Dec 22, 2005	Dec 27, 2005	70 FR 76669	05-24599	
3	Provision of Aviation Insurance Coverage for Commercial Air Carrier Service in Domestic and International Operations, 2006	Dec 21, 2006	Dec 26, 2006	71 FR 77243	06-9891	
4	Designation of Officers of the Department of Justice, 2006	Dec 8, 2006	Dec 12, 2006	71 FR 74751	06-9691	
5	Provision of Aviation Insurance Coverage for Commercial Air Carrier Service in Domestic and International Operations, 2007	Dec 27, 2007	Jan 9, 2008	73 FR 1811	08-75	
6	Provision of Aviation Insurance Coverage for Commercial Air Carrier Service in Domestic and International Operations, 2008	Dec 23, 2008	Dec 30, 2008	73 FR 79589	E8-31140	
7	Designation of Officers to Act as President of the Overseas Private Investment Corporation	Jan 16, 2009	Jan 22, 2009	74 FR 4101	E9-1541	

== Presidential determinations ==
#	Title/Description	Date signed	Date published	FR Citation	FR Doc #	Ref.
1	Certification for Major Illicit Drug Producing and Drug	Mar 1, 2001	Mar 12, 2001	66 FR 14454	01-6296	
2	Suspension of Limitations Under the Jerusalem Embassy Act, Jun 2001	Jun 11, 2001	Jun 28, 2001	66 FR 34355	01-16446	
3	Provision of Aviation Insurance Coverage for Commercial Air Carrier Service in Domestic and International Operations, 2001	Sep 23, 2001	Sep 25, 2001	66 FR 49073	01-24179	
4	Suspension of Limitations Under the Jerusalem Embassy Act, Dec 2001	Dec 14, 2001	Dec 27, 2001	66 FR 66707	01-31813	
5	Suspension of Limitations Under the Jerusalem Embassy Act, Jun 2002	Jun 14, 2002	Jun 25, 2002	67 FR 42705	02-16154	
6	Suspension of Limitations Under the Jerusalem Embassy Act, Dec 2002	Dec 13, 2002	Dec 23, 2002	67 FR 78125	02-32422	
7	Suspension of Limitations Under the Jerusalem Embassy Act, Jun 2003	Jun 13, 2003	Jun 24, 2003	68 FR 37387	03-16077	
8	Suspension of Limitations Under the Jerusalem Embassy Act, Dec 2003	Dec 9, 2003	Dec 23, 2003	68 FR 74459	03-31591	
9	Suspension of Limitations Under the Jerusalem Embassy Act, Jun 2004	Jun 15, 2004	Jun 29, 2004	69 FR 38795	04-14839	
10	Suspension of Limitations Under the Jerusalem Embassy Act, Dec 2004	Dec 15, 2004	Dec 30, 2004	69 FR 78851	04-28732	
11	Provision of Aviation Insurance Coverage for Commercial Air Carrier Service in Domestic and International Operations, 2004	Dec 21, 2004	Dec 27, 2004	69 FR 77607	04-28405	
12	Suspension of Limitations Under the Jerusalem Embassy Act, Jun 2005	Jun 15, 2005	Jun 27, 2005	70 FR 36805	05-12761	
13	Suspension of Limitations Under the Jerusalem Embassy Act, Dec 2005	Dec 14, 2005	Dec 22, 2005	70 FR 75929	05-24430	
14	Suspension of Limitations Under the Jerusalem Embassy Act, Jun 2006	Jun 15, 2006	Jun 26, 2006	71 FR 36437	06-5716	
15	Waiving the Prohibition on the Use of Fiscal Year 2006 Economic Support Funds With Respect to Various Parties to the Rome Statute Establishing the International Criminal Court	Nov 27, 2006	Dec 12, 2006	71 FR 74453	06-9665	
16	Suspension of Limitations Under the Jerusalem Embassy Act, Dec 2006	Dec 15, 2006	Jan 16, 2007	72 FR 1901	07-134	
17	Suspension of Limitations Under the Jerusalem Embassy Act, Jun 2007	Jun 1, 2007	Jun 25, 2007	72 FR 34975	07-3138	
18	Suspension of Limitations Under the Jerusalem Embassy Act, Dec 2007	Dec 12, 2007	Jan 22, 2008	73 FR 3847	08-240	
19	Waiver of Reimbursement Under the U.N. Participation Act To Support UNAMID Efforts in Darfur	Dec 14, 2007	Jan 22, 2008	73 FR 3851	08-241	
20	Suspension of Limitations Under the Jerusalem Embassy Act, Jun 2008	Jun 4, 2008	Jun 11, 2008	73 FR 33289	08-1349	
21	Waiving the Prohibition on the Use of Economic Support Funds With Respect to Various Parties to the Rome Statute Establishing the International Criminal Court	Jun 20, 2008	Jun 26, 2008	73 FR 36401	08-1393	
22	Proposed Agreement for Cooperation Between the Government of the United States of America And the Government of the United Arab Emirates Concerning Peaceful Uses of Nuclear power	Nov 14, 2008	Nov 21, 2008	73 FR 70583	E8-27870	
23	Suspension of Limitations Under the Jerusalem Embassy Act, Dec 2008	Dec 4, 2008	Dec 17, 2008	73 FR 76503	E8-30103	
24	Unexpected Urgent Humanitarian Needs Related to the Democratic Republic of Congo, Rwanda, and Uganda	Dec 18, 2008	Dec 31, 2008	73 FR 80293	E8-31237	
25	Waiver of Reimbursement Under the United Nations Participation Act to Support the United Nations/African Union Mission in Darfur	Jan 1, 2009	Jan 13, 2009	74 FR 1583	E9-598	
26	Limited Waiver of Certain Sanctions Imposed by, and Delegation of Certain Authorities Pursuant to, the Tom Lantos Block Burmese JADE (Junta's Anti-Democratic Efforts) Act of 2008	Jan 15, 2009	Jan 21, 2009	74 FR 3957	E9-1362	
27	Eligibility of the Southern African Development Community to Receive Defense Articles and Defense Services under the Foreign Assistance Act of 1961, as Amended, and the Arms Export Control Act, as Amended	Jan 16, 2009	Jan 29, 2009	74 FR 5097	E9-2066	
28	Waiving the Prohibition on the Use of Economic Support Funds with Respect to Various Parties to the Rome Statute Establishing the International Criminal Court	Jan 16, 2009	Jan 29, 2009	74 FR 5099	E9-2070	

== Presidential notices ==
=== 2001 ===
#	Title/Description	Date signed	Date published	FR Citation	FR Doc #	Ref.
1	Regarding the Continuation of Proclamation 6867^{215}	Feb 27, 2001	Feb 28, 2001	66 FR 12839	01-5067	
2	Regarding the Continuation of Iran Emergency^{216}	Mar 13, 2001	Mar 14, 2001	66 FR 15013	01-6559	

== See also ==
- List of executive actions by Bill Clinton, EO #12834–13197 (1993–2001)
- List of executive actions by Barack Obama, EO #13489–13764 (2009–2017)
