= List of executive actions by Bill Clinton =

The president of the United States may take any of several kinds of executive actions.

Executive orders are issued to help officers and agencies of the executive branch manage the operations within the federal government itself. Presidential memoranda are closely related, and have the force of law on the Executive Branch, but are generally considered less prestigious. Presidential memoranda do not have an established process for issuance, and unlike executive orders, they are not numbered. A presidential determination results in an official policy or position of the executive branch of the United States government. A presidential proclamation is a statement issued by a president on a matter of public policy, under specific authority granted to the president by Congress, typically on a matter of widespread interest. Administrative orders are signed documents such as notices, letters, and orders, that can be issued to conduct administrative operations of the federal government. A presidential notice or a presidential sequestration order can also be issued.

Signature of Bill Clinton (William J. Clinton)

Listed below are executive orders numbered 12834–13197, presidential proclamations and presidential memoranda signed by Bill Clinton during his tenure as President of the United States (1993–2001). He issued 364 executive orders. His executive orders, presidential proclamations and presidential memoranda are also listed on WikiSource.

== Executive orders ==
=== 1993 ===
Relative No.	Absolute No.	Title/Description	Date signed
1	12834	Ethics Commitments by Executive Branch Appointees	January 20, 1993
2	12835	Establishment of the National Economic Council	January 25, 1993
3	12836	Revocation of Certain Executive Orders Concerning Federal Contracting; Revoked Executive Orders 12800 and 12818 (1992): see Project Labor Agreement	February 1, 1993
4	12837	Deficit Control and Productivity Improvement in the Administration of the Federal Government	February 10, 1993
5	12838	Termination and Limitation of Federal Advisory Committees	February 10, 1993
6	12839	Reduction of 100,000 Federal Positions	February 10, 1993
7	12840	Nuclear Cooperation With EURATOM	March 9, 1993
8	12841	Adjustments to Levels IV and V of the Executive Schedule	March 9, 1993
9	12842	International Development Law Institute	1993-03-29
10	12843	Procurement Requirements and Policies for Federal Agencies for Ozone-Depleting Substances	1993-04-21
11	12844	Federal Use of Alternative Fueled Vehicles	1993-04-21
12	12845	Requiring Agencies to Purchase Energy Efficient Computer Equipment	1993-04-21
13	12846	Additional Measures With Respect to the Federal Republic of Yugoslavia (Serbia and Montenegro)	1993-04-25
14	12847	Amending Executive Order No. 11423	1993-05-17
15	12848	Federal Plan to Break the Cycle of Homelessness	1993-05-19
16	12849	Implementation of Agreement With the European Community on Government Procurement	1993-05-25
17	12850	Conditions for Renewal of Most-Favored-Nation Status for the People's Republic of China in 1994	1993-05-28
18	12851	Administration of Proliferation Sanctions, Middle East Arms Control, and Related Congressional Reporting Responsibilities	1993-06-11
19	12852	President's Council on Sustainable Development	1993-06-29
20	12853	Blocking Government of Haiti Property and Prohibiting Transactions With Haiti	1993-06-30
21	12854	Implementation of the Cuban Democracy Act	1993-07-04
22	12855	Amending Executive Order No. 12852	1993-07-19
23	12856	Federal Compliance With Right-to-Know Laws and Pollution Prevention Requirements	1993-08-03
24	12857	Budget Control	1993-08-04
25	12858	Deficit Reduction Fund	1993-08-04
26	12859	Establishment of the Domestic Policy Council	1993-08-16
27	12860	Adding Members to the Committee on Foreign Investment in the United States	1993-09-03
28	12861	Elimination of One-Half of Executive Branch Internal Regulations	1993-09-11
29	12862	Setting Customer Service Standards	1993-09-11
30	12863	President's Foreign Intelligence Advisory Board	1993-09-13
31	12864	United States Advisory Council on the National Information Infrastructure	1993-09-15
32	12865	Prohibiting Certain Transactions Involving UNITA	1993-09-26
33	12866	Regulatory Planning and Review	1993-09-30
34	12867	Termination of Emergency Authority for Certain Export Controls	1993-09-30
35	12868	Measures To Restrict The Participation By United States Persons In Weapons Proliferation Activities	1993-09-30
36	12869	Continuance of Certain Federal Advisory Committees	1993-09-30
37	12870	Trade Promotion Coordinating Committee	1993-09-30
38	12871	Labor-Management Partnerships	1993-10-01
39	12872	Blocking Property of Persons Obstructing Democratization in Haiti	1993-10-18
40	12873	Federal Acquisition, Recycling, and Waste Prevention	1993-10-20
41	12874	Establishing an Emergency Board to Investigate a Dispute Between The Long Island Rail Road and Certain of Its Employees Represented by the United Transportation Union	1993-10-20
42	12875	Enhancing the Intergovernmental Partnership	1993-10-26
43	12876	Historically Black Colleges and Universities	1993-11-01
44	12877	Amendment to Executive Order No. 12569	1993-11-03
45	12878	Bipartisan Commission on Entitlement Reform	1993-11-05
46	12879	Order of Succession of Officers To Act as Secretary of the Navy	1993-11-08
47	12880	National Drug Control Program	1993-11-16
48	12881	Establishment of the National Science and Technology Council	1993-11-23
49	12882	President's Committee of Advisors on Science and Technology	1993-11-23
50	12883	Delegating a Federal Pay Administration Authority	1993-11-29
51	12884	Delegation of Functions Under the FREEDOM Support Act and Related Provisions of the Foreign Operations, Export Financing and Related Programs Appropriations Act	1993-12-01
52	12885	Amendment to Executive Order No. 12829	1993-12-14
53	12886	Adjustments of Rates of Pay and Allowances for the Uniformed Services	1993-12-23
54	12887	Amending Executive Order No. 12878	1993-12-23
55	12888	1993 Amendments to the Manual for Courts-Martial, United States, 1984	1993-12-23
56	12889	Implementation of the North American Free Trade Agreement	1993-12-27
57	12890	Amendment to Executive Order No. 12864 of September 15, 1993	1993-12-30

=== 1994 ===
Relative No.	Absolute No.	Title/Description	Date signed
58	12891	Advisory Committee on Human Radiation Experiments	1994-01-15
59	12892	Leadership and Coordination of Fair Housing in Federal Programs: Affirmatively Furthering Fair Housing	1994-01-17
60	12893	Principles for Federal Infrastructure Investments	1994-01-26
61	12894	North Pacific Marine Science Organization	1994-01-26
62	12895	North Pacific Anadromous Fish Commission	1994-01-26
63	12896	Amending the Civil Service Rules Concerning Political Activity	1994-02-03
64	12897	Garnishment of Federal Employees' Pay	1994-02-03
65	12898	Federal Actions to Address Environmental Justice in Minority Populations and Low-Income Populations	1994-02-11
66	12899	Establishing an Emergency Board to Investigate a Dispute Between the Long Island Rail Road and Certain of Its Employees Represented by the United Transportation Union	1994-02-15
67	12900	Educational Excellence for Hispanic Americans	1994-02-22
68	12901	Identification of Trade Expansion Priorities	1994-03-03
69	12902	Energy Efficiency and Water Conservation at Federal Facilities	1994-03-08
70	12903	Nuclear Cooperation With EURATOM	1994-03-09
71	12904	Commission for Environmental Cooperation, Commission for Labor Cooperation, Border Environment Cooperation Commission, and North American Development Bank	1994-03-16
72	12905	Trade and Environment Policy Advisory Committee	1994-03-25
73	12906	Coordinating Geographic Data Acquisition and Access: The National Spatial Data Infrastructure	1994-04-11
74	12907	Amending Executive Order No. 12882, President's Committee of Advisors on Science and Technology	1994-04-14
75	12908	Order of Succession of Officers to Act as Secretary of the Army	1994-04-22
76	12909	Order of Succession of Officers to Act as Secretary of the Air Force	1994-04-22
77	12910	Providing for the Closing of Government Departments and Agencies on April 27, 1994	1994-04-23
78	12911	Seal for the Office of National Drug Control Policy	1994-04-25
79	12912	Amendment to Executive Order No. 12878 (Establishing the Bipartisan Commission on Entitlement Reform)	1994-04-29
80	12913	Revocation of Executive Order No. 12582	1994-05-02
81	12914	Prohibiting Certain Transactions With Respect to Haiti	1994-05-07
82	12915	Federal Implementation of the North American Agreement on Environmental Cooperation	1994-05-13
83	12916	Implementation of the Border Environment Cooperation Commission and the North American Development Bank	1994-05-13
84	12917	Prohibiting Certain Transactions With Respect to Haiti	1994-05-21
85	12918	Prohibiting Certain Transactions With Respect to Rwanda and Delegating Authority With Respect to Other United Nations Arms Embargoes	1994-05-26
86	12919	National Defense Industrial Resources Preparedness	1994-06-03
87	12920	Prohibiting Certain Transactions With Respect to Haiti	1994-06-10
88	12921	Amendment to Executive Order No. 12864	1994-06-13
89	12922	Blocking Property of Certain Haitian Nationals	1994-06-21
90	12923	Continuation of Export Control Regulations	1994-06-30
91	12924	Continuation of Export Control Regulations	1994-08-19
92	12925	Establishing an Emergency Board to Investigate a Dispute Between the Soo Line Railroad Company and Certain of its Employees Represented by the United Transportation Union	1994-08-29
93	12926	Implementation of the National Voter Registration Act of 1993	1994-09-12
94	12927	Ordering the Selected Reserve of the Armed Forces to Active Duty	1994-09-15
95	12928	Promoting Procurement With Small Businesses Owned and Controlled by Socially and Economically Disadvantaged Individuals, Historically Black Colleges and Universities, and Minority Institutions	1994-09-16
96	12929	Delegation of Authority Regarding the Naval Petroleum and Oil Shale Reserves	1994-09-29
97	12930	Measures to Restrict the Participation by United States Persons in Weapons Proliferation Activities	1994-09-29
98	12931	Federal Procurement Reform	1994-10-13
99	12932	Termination of Emergency With Respect to Haiti	1994-10-14
100	12933	Nondisplacement of Qualified Workers Under Certain Contracts	1994-10-20
101	12934	Blocking Property and Additional Measures With Respect to the Bosnian Serb-Controlled Areas of the Republic of Bosnia and Herzegovina	1994-10-25
102	12935	Amending Executive Order No. 11157 as it Relates to the Definition of ‘‘Field Duty’’	1994-10-28
103	12936	1994 Amendments to the Manual for Courts-Martial, United States, 1984	1994-11-10
104	12937	Declassification of Selected Records Within the National Archives of the United States	1994-11-10
105	12938	Proliferation of Weapons of Mass Destruction	1994-11-14
106	12939	Expedited Naturalization of Aliens and Noncitizen Nationals Who Served in an Active-Duty Status During the Persian Gulf Conflict	1994-11-22
107	12940	Amendment to Civil Service Rule VI	1994-11-28
108	12941	Seismic Safety of Existing Federally Owned or Leased Buildings	1994-12-01
109	12942	Addition to Level V of the Executive Schedule - Commissioner, Administration for Native Americans	1994-12-12
110	12943	Further Amendment to Executive Order No. 11755	1994-12-13
111	12944	Adjustments of Certain Rates of Pay and Allowances	1994-12-28

=== 1995 ===
Relative No.	Absolute No.	Title/Description	Date signed
112	12945	Amendment to Executive Order No. 12640	1995-01-20
113	12946	President's advisory board on Arms Proliferation Policy	1995-01-20
114	12947	Prohibiting Transactions With Terrorists Who Threaten to Disrupt the Middle East Peace Process	1995-01-23
115	12948	Amendment to Executive Order No. 12898	1995-01-30
116	12949	Foreign Intelligence Physical Searches	1995-02-09
117	12950	Establishing an Emergency Board to Investigate a Dispute Between Metro North Commuter Railroad and Its Employees Represented by Certain Labor Organizations	1995-02-22
118	12951	Release of Imagery Acquired by Space-Based National Intelligence Reconnaissance Systems	1995-02-22
119	12952	Amendment to Executive Order No. 12950	1995-02-24
120	12953	Actions Required of All Executive Agencies to Facilitate Payment of Child Support	1995-02-27
121	12954	Ensuring the Economical and Efficient Administration and Completion of Federal Government Contracts	1995-03-08
122	12955	Nuclear Cooperation With EURATOM	1995-03-09
123	12956	Israel-United States Binational Industrial Research and Development Foundation	1995-03-13
124	12957	Banning U.S. investment in Iran's energy sector - see Iran and Libya Sanctions Act	1995-03-15
125	12958	Prescribing a uniform system for classifying, safeguarding, and declassifying national security information	1995-04-17
126	12959	Eliminating all trade and investment and virtually all interaction between the United States and Iran	1995-05-06
127	12960	Amendments to the Manual for Courts-Martial, United States, 1984	1995-05-12
128	12961	Presidential Advisory Committee on Gulf War Veterans' Illnesses	1995-05-26
129	12962	Recreational Fisheries	1995-06-07
130	12963	Presidential Advisory Council on HIV/AIDS	1995-06-14
131	12964	Commission on United States-Pacific Trade and Investment Policy	1995-06-21
132	12965	Further Amendment to Executive Order No. 12852	1995-06-27
133	12966	Foreign Disaster Assistance	1995-07-14
134	12967	Establishing an Emergency Board To Investigate Disputes Between Metro North Commuter Railroad and Its Employees Represented by Certain Labor Organizations	1995-07-31
135	12968	Establishing uniform policies for allowing employees of the federal government access to classified information	1995-08-02
136	12969	Federal Acquisition and Community Right-To-Know	1995-08-08
137	12970	Further Amendment to Executive Order No. 12864	1995-09-14
138	12971	Amendment to Executive Order No. 12425	1995-09-15
139	12972	Amendment to Executive Order No. 12958	1995-09-18
140	12973	Amendment to Executive Order No. 12901	1995-09-27
141	12974	Continuance of Certain Federal Advisory Committees	1995-09-29
142	12975	Protection of Human Research Subjects and Creation of National Bioethics Advisory Commission	1995-10-03
143	12976	Compensation Practices of Government Corporations	1995-10-05
144	12977	Interagency Security Committee	1995-10-19
145	12978	Blocking Assets and Prohibiting Transactions With Significant Narcotics Traffickers	1995-10-21
146	12979	Agency Procurement Protests	1995-10-25
147	12980	Further Amendment to Executive Order No. 12852, as Amended	1995-11-17
148	12981	Administration of Export Controls	1995-12-05
149	12982	Ordering the Selected Reserve of the Armed Forces to Active Duty	1995-12-08
150	12983	Amendment to Executive Order No. 12871	1995-12-21
151	12984	Adjustments of Certain Rates of Pay and Allowances	1995-12-28

=== 1996 ===
Relative No.	Absolute No.	Title/Description	Date signed
152	12985	Establishing the Armed Forces Service Medal	1996-01-11
153	12986	International Union for Conservation of Nature and Natural Resources (regarding national parks)	1996-01-18
154	12987	Amendment to Executive Order No. 12964	1996-01-31
155	12988	Civil Justice Reform	1996-02-05
156	12989	Economy and Efficiency in Government Procurement Through Compliance With Certain Immigration and Naturalization Act Provisions	1996-02-13
157	12990	Adjustments of Rates of Pay and Allowances for the Uniformed Services, Amendment to Executive Order No. 12984	1996-02-29
158	12991	Adding the Small Business Administration to the President's Export Council	1996-03-06
159	12992	President's Council on Counter-Narcotics	1996-03-15
160	12993	Administrative Allegations Against Inspectors General	1996-03-21
161	12994	Continuing the President's Committee on Mental Retardation and Broadening Its Membership and Responsibilities	1996-03-21
162	12995	Amendment to Executive Order No. 12873	1996-03-25
163	12996	Management and General Public Use of the National Wildlife Refuge System	1996-03-25
164	12997	Korean Peninsula Energy Development Organization	1996-04-01
165	12998	Amendment to Executive Order No. 11880	1996-04-05
166	12999	Educational Technology: Ensuring Opportunity for All Children in the Next Century	1996-04-17
167	13000	Order of Succession of Officers to Act as Secretary of Defense	1996-04-24
168	13001	Establishing an Emergency Board to Investigate a Dispute Between Certain Railroads Represented by the National Railway Labor Conference and Their Employees Represented by the Transportation Communications International Union	1996-05-08
169	13002	Termination of Combat Zone Designation in Vietnam and Waters Adjacent Thereto	1996-05-13
170	13003	Establishing an Emergency Board to Investigate Disputes Between Certain Railroads Represented by the National Carriers' Conference Committee of the National Labor Conference and Their Employees Represented by the Brotherhood of Maintenance of Way Employees	1996-05-15
171	13004	Establishing an Emergency Board to Investigate Disputes Between Certain Railroads Represented by the National Railway Labor Conference and Their Employees Represented by Certain Labor Organizations	1996-05-17
172	13005	Empowerment Contracting	1996-05-21
173	13006	Locating Federal Facilities on Historic Properties in Our Nation's Central Cities	1996-05-21
174	13007	Indian Sacred Sites	1996-05-24
175	13008	Amending Executive Order No. 12880	1996-06-03
176	13009	Amendment to Executive Order No. 12963 Entitled Presidential Advisory Council on HIV/AIDS	1996-06-14
177	13010	Establishment of the Infrastructure Protection Task Force ("IPTF") to help protect critical infrastructure	1996-07-15
178	13011	Federal Information Technology	1996-07-16
179	13012	Establishing an Emergency Board To Investigate a Dispute Between the Southeastern Pennsylvania Transportation Authority and Their Employees Represented by the Brotherhood of Locomotive Engineers	1996-07-18
180	13013	Amending Executive Order No. 10163, the Armed Forces Reserve Medal	1996-08-06
181	13014	Maintaining Unofficial Relations With the People on Taiwan	1996-08-15
182	13015	White House Commission on Aviation Safety and Security	1996-08-22
183	13016	Amendment to Executive Order No. 12580	1996-08-28
184	13017	Advisory Commission on Consumer Protection and Quality in the Health Care Industry	1996-09-05
185	13018	Amending Executive Order No. 12975	1996-09-16
186	13019	Supporting Families: Collecting Delinquent Child Support Obligations	1996-09-28
187	13020	Amendment to Executive Order 12981	1996-10-12
188	13021	Tribal Colleges and Universities	1996-10-19
189	13022	Administration of the Midway Islands	1996-10-31
190	13023	Amendments to Executive Order 12992, Expanding and Changing the Name of the President's Council on Counter-Narcotics	1996-11-06
191	13024	Amending Executive Order 12015, Relating to Competitive Appointments of Students Who Have Completed Approved Career-Related Work Study Programs	1996-11-07
192	13025	Amendment to Executive Order 13010, the President's Commission on Critical Infrastructure Protection	1996-11-13
193	13026	Administration of Export Controls on Encryption Products	1996-11-15
194	13027	Establishing an Emergency Board To Investigate a Dispute Between the Southeastern Pennsylvania Transportation Authority and Its Employees Represented by the Brotherhood of Locomotive Engineers	1996-11-15
195	13028	Further Amendments to Executive Order No. 12757 Implementation of the Enterprise for the Americas Initiative	1996-12-03
196	13029	Implementing, for the United States, the Provisions of An- nex 1 of the Decision Concerning Legal Capacity and Privileges and Immunities, Issued by the Council of Ministers of the Conference on Security and Cooperation in Europe on December 1, 1993	1996-12-03
197	13030	Administration of Foreign Assistance and Related Functions and Arms Export Controls	1996-12-12
198	13031	Federal Alternative Fueled Vehicle Leadership	1996-12-13
199	13032	Further Amendment to Executive Order No. 12964	1996-12-26
200	13033	Executive Order 13033 of December 27, 1996	1996-12-27

=== 1997 ===
Relative No.	Absolute No.	Title/Description	Date signed
201	13034	Extension of Presidential Advisory Committee on Gulf War Veterans' Illnesses	1997-01-30
202	13035	Advisory Committee on High-Performance Computing and Communications, Information Technology, and the Next Generation Internet	1997-02-14
203	13036	Establishing an Emergency Board To Investigate a Dispute Between American Airlines and its Employees Represented by the Allied Pilots Association	1997-02-15
204	13037	Commission To Study Capital Budgeting	1997-03-03
205	13038	Advisory Committee on Public Interest Obligations of Digital Television Broadcasters	1997-03-11
206	13039	Exclusion of the Naval Special Warfare Development Group From the Federal Labor-Management Relations Program	1997-03-11
207	13040	Amendment to Executive Order 13017, Advisory Commission on Consumer Protection and Quality in the Health Care Industry	1997-03-25
208	13041	Further Amendment to Executive Order 13010, as Amended	1997-04-03
209	13042	Implementing for the United States Article VIII of the Agreement Establishing the World Trade Organization Concerning Legal Capacity and Privileges and Immunities	1997-04-09
210	13043	Increasing Seat Belt Use in the United States	1997-04-16
211	13044	Amending Executive Order 12752, Implementation of the Agricultural Trade Development and Assistance Act of 1954, as Amended, and the Food for Progress Act of 1985, as Amended	1997-04-18
212	13045	Protection of Children From Environmental Health Risks and Safety Risks	1997-04-21
213	13046	Further Amendment to Executive Order 12975 of May 16, 1997, Extension of the National Bioethics Advisory Commission	1997-05-16
214	13047	Prohibiting New Investment in Burma	1997-05-20
215	13048	Improving Administrative Management in the Executive Branch	1997-06-10
216	13049	Organization for the Prohibition of Chemical Weapons	1997-06-11
217	13050	President's advisory board on Race	1997-06-13
218	13051	Internal Revenue Service Management Board	1997-06-24
219	13052	Hong Kong Economic and Trade Offices	1997-06-30
220	13053	Adding Members to and Extending the President's Council on Sustainable Development	1997-06-30
221	13054	Eligibility of Certain Overseas Employees for Noncompetitive Appointments	1997-07-07
222	13055	Coordination of United States Government International Exchanges and Training Programs	1997-07-15
223	13056	Further Amendment to Executive Order 13017, Advisory Commission on Consumer Protection and Quality in the Health Care Industry	1997-07-21
224	13057	Federal Actions in the Lake Tahoe Region	1997-07-26
225	13058	Protecting Federal Employees and the Public From Exposure to Tobacco Smoke in the Federal Workplace	1997-08-09
226	13059	Prohibiting Certain Transactions With Respect to Iran	1997-08-19
227	13060	Establishing an Emergency Board To Investigate Disputes Between Amtrak and its Employees Represented by the Brotherhood of Maintenance of Way Employes	1997-08-21
228	13061	Federal Support of Community Efforts Along American Heritage Rivers	1997-09-11
229	13062	Continuance of Certain Federal Advisory Committees and Amendments to Executive Orders 13038 and 13054	1997-09-29
230	13063	Level V of the Executive Schedule: Removal of the executive director, Pension Benefit Guaranty Corporation, Department of Labor	1997-09-30
231	13064	Further Amendment to Executive Order 13010, as Amended, Critical Infrastructure Protection	1997-10-11
232	13065	Further Amendment to Executive Order 13038 Advisory Committee on Public Interest Obligations of Digital Television Broadcasters	1997-10-22
233	13066	Amendment to Executive Order 13037, Commission To Study Capital Budgeting	1997-10-29
234	13067	Blocking Sudanese Government Property and Prohibiting Transactions With Sudan	1997-11-03
235	13068	Closing of Government Departments and Agencies on Friday, December 26, 1997	1997-11-25
236	13069	Prohibiting Certain Transactions With Respect to UNITA	1997-12-12
237	13070	The Intelligence Oversight Board, Amendment to Executive Order 12863	1997-12-15
238	13071	Adjustments of Certain Rates of Pay	1997-12-29

=== 1998 ===
Relative No.	Absolute No.	Title/Description	Date signed
239	13072	White House Millennium Council	1998-02-02
240	13073	Year 2000 Conversion. Established the President's Council on Year 2000 Conversion.	1998-02-04
241	13074	Amendment to Executive Order 12656	1998-02-09
242	13075	Special Oversight Board for Department of Defense Investigations of Gulf War Chemical and Biological Incidents	1998-02-19
243	13076	Ordering the Selected Reserve of the Armed Forces to Active Duty	1998-02-24
244	13077	Further Amendment to Executive Order 13010, Critical Infrastructure Protection	1998-03-10
245	13078	Increasing Employment of Adults With Disabilities	1998-03-13
246	13079	Waiver Under The Trade Act Of 1974 With Respect to Vietnam	1998-04-07
247	13080	American Heritage Rivers Initiative Advisory Committee	1998-04-07
248	13081	Amendment to Executive Order No. 13038, Advisory Committee on Public Interest Obligations of Digital Television Broadcasters	1998-04-30
249	13082	Joint Mexican-United States Defense Commission	1998-05-08
250	13083	Federalism	1998-05-14
251	13084	Consultation and Coordination With Indian Tribal Governments	1998-05-14
252	13085	Establishment of the Enrichment Oversight Committee	1998-05-26
253	13086	1998 Amendments to the Manual for Courts-Martial, United States	1998-05-27
254	13087	Prohibiting Discrimination Based on sexual orientation in the competitive service of the Federal Civilian Workforce, Which Includes civilians Employed by the Armed Forces	1998-05-28
255	13088	Blocking Property of the Governments of the Federal Republic of Yugoslavia (Serbia and Montenegro), the Republic of Serbia, and the Republic of Montenegro, and Prohibiting New Investment in the Republic of Serbia in Response to the Situation in Kosovo	1998-06-09
256	13089	Coral Reef Protection	1998-06-11
257	13090	President's Commission on the Celebration of Women in American History	1998-06-29
258	13091	Administration of Arms Export Controls and Foreign Assistance	1998-06-29
259	13092	President's Information Technology Advisory Committee, Amendments to Executive Order 13035	1998-07-24
260	13093	American Heritage Rivers, Amending Executive Order 13061 and 13080	1998-07-27
261	13094	Proliferation of Weapons of Mass Destruction	1998-07-28
262	13095	Suspension of Executive Order 13083	1998-08-05
263	13096	American Indian and Alaska Native Education	1998-08-06
264	13097	Interparliamentary Union	1998-08-07
265	13098	Blocking Property of UNITA and ProhibitingCertain Transactions With Respect to UNITA	1998-08-18
266	13099	Prohibiting Transactions With Terrorists Who Threaten To Disrupt the Middle East Peace Process	1998-08-20
267	13100	President's Council on Food Safety	1998-08-25
268	13101	Greening the Government Through Waste Prevention, Recycling, and Federal Acquisition	1998-09-14
269	13102	Further Amendment to Executive Order 13038, Advisory Committee on Public Interest Obligations of Digital Television Broadcasters	1998-09-25
270	13103	Computer Software Piracy	1998-09-30
271	13104	Amendment to Executive Order 13021, Tribal Colleges and Universities	1998-10-19
272	13105	Open Enrollment Season for Participants in the Foreign Service Retirement and Disability System and the Central Intelligence Agency Retirement and Disability System	1998-11-02
273	13106	Adjustments of Certain Rates of Pay and Delegation of a Federal Pay Administration Authority	1998-12-07
274	13107	Implementation of Human Rights Treaties	1998-12-10
275	13108	Further Amendment to Executive Order 13037, Commission To Study Capital Budgeting	1998-12-11
276	13109	Half-Day Closing of Executive Departments and Agencies of the Federal Government on Thursday, December 24, 1998	1998-12-17

=== 1999 ===
Relative No.	Absolute No.	Title/Description	Date signed
277	13110	Nazi War Criminal Records Interagency Working Group	1999-01-11
278	13111	Using Technology To Improve Training Opportunities for Federal Government Employees	1999-01-12
279	13112	On Feb 3, 1999, Executive Order 13112 was signed establishing the National Invasive Species Council. The Executive Order requires that a Council of Departments dealing with invasive species be created.	1999-02-03
280	13113	President's Information Technology Advisory Committee, Further Amendments to Executive Order 13035, as Amended	1999-02-10
281	13114	Further Amendment to Executive Order 12852, as Amended, Extending the President's Council on Sustainable Development	1999-02-28
282	13115	Interagency Task Force on the Roles and Missions of the United States Coast Guard	1999-03-25
283	13116	Identification of Trade Expansion Priorities and Discriminatory Procurement Practices	1999-03-31
284	13117	Further Amendment to Executive Order 12981, as Amended	1999-03-31
285	13118	Implementation of the Foreign Affairs Reform and Restructuring Act of 1998	1999-03-31
286	13119	Designation of Federal Republic of Yugoslavia (Serbia/Montenegro), Albania, the Airspace Above, and Adjacent Waters as a Combat Zone	1999-04-13
287	13120	Ordering the Selected Reserve and Certain Individual Ready Reserve Members of the Armed Forces to Active Duty	1999-04-27
288	13121	Blocking Property of the Governments of the Federal Republic of Yugoslavia (Serbia and Montenegro), the Republic of Serbia, and the Republic of Montenegro, and Prohibiting Trade Transactions Involving the Federal Republic of Yugoslavia (Serbia and Montenegro) in Response to the Situation in Kosovo	1999-04-30
289	13122	Interagency Task Force on the Economic Development of the Southwest Border	1999-05-25
290	13123	Greening the Government Through Efficient Energy Management	1999-06-03
291	13124	Amending the Civil Service Rules Relating To Federal Employees With Psychiatric Disabilities	1999-06-04
292	13125	Increasing Participation of Asian Americans and Pacific Islanders in Federal Programs	1999-06-07
293	13126	Prohibition of Acquisition of Products Produced by Forced or Indentured Child Labor	1999-06-12
294	13127	Amendment to Executive Order 13073, Year 2000 Conversion	1999-06-14
295	13128	Implementation of the Chemical Weapons Convention	1999-06-25
296	13129	Blocking Property and Prohibiting Transactions With the Taliban	1999-07-04
297	13130	National Infrastructure Assurance Council	1999-07-14
298	13131	Further Amendments to Executive Order 12757, Implementation of the Enterprise for the Americas Initiative	1999-07-22
299	13132	Directs federal agencies to respect constitutional rights of states →Federalism	1999-08-04
300	13133	Working Group on Unlawful Conduct on the Internet	1999-08-05
301	13134	Developing and Promoting Biobased Products and Bioenergy	1999-08-12
302	13135	Amendment to Executive Order 12216, President's Committee on the International Labor Organization	1999-08-27
303	13136	Amendment to Executive Order 13090, President's Commission on the Celebration of Women in American History	1999-09-03
304	13137	Amendment to Executive Order 12975, as Amended, National Bioethics Advisory Commission	1999-09-15
305	13138	Continuance of Certain Federal Advisory Committees	1999-09-30
306	13139	Improving Health Protection of Military Personnel Participating in Particular Military Operations	1999-09-30
307	13140	1999 Amendments to the Manual for Courts-Martial, United States	1999-10-06
308	13141	Environmental Review of Trade Agreements	1999-11-16
309	13142	Amendment To Executive Order 12958Classified National Security Information	1999-11-19
310	13143	Amending Executive Order 10173, as Amended, Prescribing Regulations Relating to the Safeguarding of Vessels, Harbors, Ports, and Waterfront Facilities of the United States	1999-12-01
311	13144	Adjustments of Certain Rates of Pay	1999-12-21

=== 2000 ===
Relative No.	Absolute No.	Title/Description	Date signed
312	13145	To Prohibit Discrimination in Federal Employment Based on Genetic Information	2000-02-08
313	13146	President's Council on the Future of Princeville, North Carolina	2000-02-29
314	13147	White House Commission on Complementary and Alternative Medicine Policy	2000-03-07
315	13148	Greening the Government Through Leadership in	2000-04-21
316	13149	Greening the Government Through Federal Fleet and	2000-04-21
317	13150	Federal Workforce Transportation	2000-04-21
318	13151	Global Disaster Information Network	2000-04-27
319	13152	Further Amendment to Executive Order 11478, Equal Employment Opportunity in Federal Government	2000-05-02
320	13153	Actions To Improve Low-Performing Schools	2000-05-03
321	13154	Establishing the Kosovo Campaign Medal	2000-05-03
322	13155	Access to HIV/AIDS Pharmaceuticals and Medical	2000-05-10
323	13156	Amendment to Executive Order 12871 Regarding the National Partnership Council	2000-05-17
324	13157	Increasing Opportunities for Women-Owned Small Businesses	2000-05-23
325	13158	Established the National Marine Protected Areas Initiative	2000-05-26
326	13159	Blocking Property of the Government of the Russian Federation Relating to the Disposition of Highly Enriched Uranium Extracted From Nuclear Weapons	2000-06-21
327	13160	Nondiscrimination on the Basis of Race, Sex, Color, National Origin, Disability, Religion, Age, Sexual Orientation, and Status as a Parent in Federally Conducted Education and Training Programs	2000-06-23
328	13161	Establishment of the Presidential Medal of Valor for Public Safety Officers	2000-06-29
329	13162	Federal Career Intern Program	2000-07-06
330	13163	Increasing the Opportunity for Individuals With Disabilities To Be Employed in the Federal Government	2000-07-26
331	13164	Requiring Federal Agencies To Establish Procedures To Facilitate the Provision of Reasonable Accommodation	2000-07-26
332	13165	Creation of the White House Task Force on Drug Use in Sports and Authorization for the Director of the Office of National Drug Control Policy To Serve as the United States Government's Representative on the Board of the World Anti-Doping Agency	2000-08-09
333	13166	Required Federal agencies to provide services so that individuals with limited English proficiency (LEP) can have meaningful access to them.	2000-08-11
334	13167	Amendment to Executive Order 13147, Increasing the Membership of the White House Commission on Complementary and Alternative Medicine Policy	2000-09-15
335	13168	President's Commission on Improving Economic Opportunity in Communities Dependent on Tobacco Production While Protecting Public Health	2000-09-22
336	13169	Assistance to Small Business Exporters and Dislocated	2000-10-06
337	13170	Increasing Opportunities and Access for Disadvantaged Businesses	2000-10-06
338	13171	Hispanic Employment in the Federal Government	2000-10-12
339	13172	Amendment to Executive Order 13078, To Expand the Role of the National Task Force on Employment of Adults With Disabilities To Include a Focus on Youth	2000-10-25
340	13173	Interagency Task Force on the Economic Development of the Central San Joaquin Valley	2000-10-25
341	13174	Commission on Workers, Communities, and Economic Change in the New Economy	2000-10-27
342	13175	Directed Federal agencies on the conduct of regular and meaningful consultation and collaboration with tribal officials in the development of Federal policies that have tribal implications.	2000-11-06
343	13176	Facilitation of a Presidential Transition	2000-11-27
344	13177	National Commission on the Use of Offsets in Defense Trade and President's Council on the Use of Offsets in Commercial Trade	2000-12-04
345	13178	Northwestern Hawaiian Islands Coral Reef Ecosystem Reserve	2000-12-04
346	13179	Providing Compensation to America's Nuclear Weapons Workers	2000-12-07
347	13180	Air Traffic Performance-Based Organization	2000-12-07
348	13181	To Protect the Privacy of Protected Health Information in Oversight Investigations	2000-12-20
349	13182	Adjustments of Certain Rates of Pay	2000-12-23
350	13183	Establishment of the President's Task Force on Puerto Rico's Status	2000-12-23
351	13184	Revocation of Executive Order 12834	2000-12-28
352	13185	To Strengthen the Federal Government-University Research Partnership	2000-12-28

=== 2001 ===
Relative No.	Absolute No.	Title/Description	Date signed
353	13186	Responsibilities of Federal Agencies To Protect Migratory Birds	2001-01-10
354	13187	The President's Disability Employment Partnership Board	2001-01-10
355	13188	Amendment to Executive Order 13111, Extension of the Advisory Committee on Expanding Training Opportunities	2001-01-12
356	13189	Federal Interagency Task Force on the District of Columbia	2001-01-15
357	13190	President's Commission on Educational Resource Equity	2001-01-15
358	13191	Implementation of the African Growth and Opportunity Act and the United States-Caribbean Basin Trade Partnership Act	2001-01-17
359	13192	Lifting and Modifying Measures With Respect to the Federal Republic of Yugoslavia (Serbia and Montenegro)	2001-01-17
360	13193	Federal Leadership on Global Tobacco Control and Prevention	2001-01-18
361	13194	Prohibiting the Importation of Rough Diamonds From Sierra Leone	2001-01-18
362	13195	Trails for America in the 21st Century	2001-01-18
363	13196	Final Northwestern Hawaiian Islands Coral Reef Ecosystem Reserve	2001-01-18
364	13197	Governmentwide Accountability for Merit System Principles; Workforce Information	2001-01-18

== Presidential proclamations ==
=== 1993 ===
Relative No.	Absolute No.	Title/Description	Date signed

=== 1994 ===
Relative No.	Absolute No.	Title/Description	Date signed

=== 1995 ===
Relative No.	Absolute No.	Title/Description	Date signed

=== 1996 ===
Relative No.	Absolute No.	Title/Description	Date signed

=== 1997 ===
Relative No.	Absolute No.	Title/Description	Date signed

=== 1998 ===
Relative No.	Absolute No.	Title/Description	Date signed

=== 1999 ===
Relative No.	Absolute No.	Title/Description	Date signed

=== 2000 ===
Relative No.	Absolute No.	Title/Description	Date signed

=== 2001 ===
Relative No.	Absolute No.	Title/Description	Date signed

== Presidential memoranda ==
=== 1993 ===
Relative No.	Absolute No.	Title/Description	Date signed

=== 1994 ===
Relative No.	Absolute No.	Title/Description	Date signed

=== 1995 ===
Relative No.	Absolute No.	Title/Description	Date signed

=== 1996 ===
Relative No.	Absolute No.	Title/Description	Date signed

=== 1997 ===
Relative No.	Absolute No.	Title/Description	Date signed

=== 1998 ===
Relative No.	Absolute No.	Title/Description	Date signed

=== 1999 ===
Relative No.	Absolute No.	Title/Description	Date signed

=== 2000 ===
Relative No.	Absolute No.	Title/Description	Date signed

=== 2001 ===
Relative No.	Absolute No.	Title/Description	Date signed

== See also ==
- List of executive actions by George H. W. Bush, EO #12668–12833 (1989–1993)
- List of executive actions by George W. Bush, EO #13198–13488 (2001–2009)
