= List of executive actions by Ronald Reagan =

The president of the United States may take any of several kinds of executive actions.

Executive orders are issued to help officers and agencies of the executive branch manage the operations within the federal government itself. Presidential memoranda are closely related, and have the force of law on the Executive Branch, but are generally considered less prestigious. Presidential memoranda do not have an established process for issuance, and unlike executive orders, they are not numbered. A presidential determination results in an official policy or position of the executive branch of the United States government. A presidential proclamation is a statement issued by a president on a matter of public policy, under specific authority granted to the president by Congress, typically on a matter of widespread interest. Administrative orders are signed documents such as notices, letters, and orders, that can be issued to conduct administrative operations of the federal government. A presidential notice or a presidential sequestration order can also be issued.

Listed below are executive orders numbered 12287–12667, signed by United States President Ronald Reagan (1981–1989). He signed 381 executive orders. His executive orders are also listed on Wikisource, along with his presidential proclamations, national security decision directives and national security study directives.

Signature of Ronald Reagan

== Executive orders ==
=== 1981 ===
Relative No.	Absolute No.	Title/Description	Date signed
1	12287	Decontrol of Crude Oil and Refined Petroleum Products	January 28, 1981
2	12288	Termination of the Wage and Price Regulatory Program	January 29, 1981
3	12289	Foreign Service Retirement and Disability System	February 14, 1981
4	12290	Federal Exports and Excessive Regulation	February 17, 1981
5	12291	Federal Regulation	February 17, 1981
6	12292	Foreign Service Act of 1980	February 23, 1981
7	12293	The Foreign Service of the United States	February 23, 1981
8	12294	Suspension of litigation against Iran	February 24, 1981
9	12295	Nuclear Cooperation with EURATOM	February 24, 1981
10	12296	President's Economic Policy Advisory Board	March 2, 1981
11	12297	International Coffee Agreement of 1976	March 12, 1981
12	12298	Lake Tahoe region	March 12, 1981
13	12299	Presidential Advisory Board on Ambassadorial Appointments	March 17, 1981
14	12300	Exceptions from the Competitive Service	March 23, 1981
15	12301	Integrity and Efficiency in Federal Programs	March 26, 1981
16	12302	Amending the Generalized System of Preferences	April 1, 1981
17	12303	Presidential Advisory Committee on Federalism	April 8, 1981
18	12304	Seal for the Panama Canal Commission	April 29, 1981
19	12305	Termination of certain Federal advisory committees	May 5, 1981
20	12306	Amendments to the Manual for Courts-Martial, United States, 1969 (Revised Edition)	June 1, 1981
21	12307	President's Commission on Hostage Compensation	June 4, 1981
22	12308	Presidential Task Force on the Arts and Humanities	June 5, 1981
23	12309	President's Economic Policy Advisory Board	June 9, 1981
24	12310	President's Commission on Housing	June 16, 1981
25	12311	Amending the Generalized System of Preferences	June 29, 1981
26	12312	The Meritorious Service Medal	July 2, 1981
27	12313	Specification of hostage return date under Hostage Relief Act of 1980	July 13, 1981
28	12314	Federal Regional Councils	July 22, 1981
29	12315	Amending the Manual for Courts-Martial, United States, 1969 (Revised Edition)	July 29, 1981
30	12316	Responses to environmental damage	August 14, 1981
31	12317	President's Commission on Hostage Compensation	August 14, 1981
32	12318	Statistical policy functions	August 21, 1981
33	12319	River Basin Commissions	September 9, 1981
34	12320	Historically Black Colleges and Universities	September 15, 1981
35	12321	Foreign assistance and arms export control	September 14, 1981
36	12322	Water resources projects	September 17, 1981
37	12323	Presidential Commission on Broadcasting to Cuba	September 22, 1981
38	12324	Interdiction of illegal aliens	September 29, 1981
39	12325	Presidential Task Force on the Arts and Humanities	September 30, 1981
40	12326	Central Intelligence Agency Retirement and Disability System	September 30, 1981
41	12327	Exemption for Fort Allen	October 1, 1981
42	12328	Federal employees contracting or trading with Indians	October 8, 1981
43	12329	President's Task Force on Private Sector Initiatives	October 14, 1981
44	12330	Adjustments of certain rates of pay and allowances	October 15, 1981
45	12331	President's Foreign Intelligence Advisory Board	October 20, 1981
46	12332	Establishment of the National Productivity Advisory Committee	November 10, 1981
47	12333	United States Intelligence Activities	December 4, 1981
48	12334	President's Intelligence Oversight Board	December 4, 1981
49	12335	National Commission on Social Security Reform	December 16, 1981
50	12336	The Task Force on Legal Equity for Women	December 21, 1981

=== 1982 ===
Relative No.	Absolute No.	Title/Description	Date signed
51	12337	Basic allowance for subsistence for Uniformed Services	January 11, 1982
52	12338	Exclusions from the Federal Labor-Management Relations Program	January 11, 1982
53	12339	President's Commission on Housing	January 13, 1982
54	12340	Amendments to the Manual for Courts-Martial, United States, 1969 (Revised Edition)	January 20, 1982
55	12341	Cuban and Haitian entrants	January 21, 1982
56	12342	Environmental safeguards for animal damage control on Federal lands	January 27, 1982
57	12343	Designation of certain officers to act as Secretary of State	January 27, 1982
58	12344	Naval Nuclear Propulsion Program	February 1, 1982
59	12345	Physical fitness and sports	February 2, 1982
60	12346	Synthetic Fuels	February 8, 1982
61	12347	Agreement on Government Procurement	February 23, 1982
62	12348	Federal Real Property	February 25, 1982
63	12349	Amending the Generalized System of Preferences	February 26, 1982
64	12350	Termination of Urban and Community Impact Analyses	March 9, 1982
65	12351	Nuclear cooperation with EURATOM	March 9, 1982
66	12352	Federal procurement reforms	March 17, 1982
67	12353	Charitable fund-raising	March 23, 1982
68	12354	Amending the Generalized System of Preferences	March 30, 1982
69	12355	The Task Force on Legal Equity for Women	April 1, 1982
70	12356	National Security Information	April 2, 1982
71	12357	Sinai Support Mission	April 6, 1982
72	12358	Presidential Commission on Drunk Driving	April 14, 1982
73	12359	Public international organizations entitled to enjoy privileges, exemptions, and immunities	April 23, 1982
74	12360	President's Task Force on Victims of Crime	April 23, 1982
75	12361	Multinational Force and Observers reports	April 27, 1982
76	12362	Overseas employment	May 12, 1982
77	12363	The Foreign Service of the United States	May 21, 1982
78	12364	Presidential Management Intern Program	May 24, 1982
79	12365	Foreign assistance and arms control	May 24, 1982
80	12366	Presidential Commission on Broadcasting to Cuba	May 25, 1982
81	12367	President's Committee on the Arts and the Humanities	June 15, 1982
82	12368	Drug Abuse Policy Functions	June 24, 1982
83	12369	President's private sector survey on cost control in the Federal Government	June 30, 1982
84	12370	Creating an emergency board to investigate a dispute between the Brotherhood of Locomotive Engineers and certain railroads represented by the National Carriers' Conference Committee of the National Railway Labor Conference	July 8, 1982
85	12371	Amending the Generalized System of Preferences	July 12, 1982
86	12372	Intergovernmental Review of Federal Programs	July 14, 1982
87	12373	Establishing an emergency board to investigate a dispute between the United Transportation Union and certain railroads represented by the National Carriers' Conference Committee of the National Railway Labor Conference	July 21, 1982
88	12374	Reports on international organizations	July 28, 1982
89	12375	Motor Vehicles	August 4, 1982
90	12376	Presidential Commission on Drunk Driving	August 5, 1982
91	12377	Joint Mexican-United States Defense Commission	August 6, 1982
92	12378	President's Committee on the Arts and the Humanities	August 6, 1982
93	12379	Termination of boards, committees, and commissions	August 17, 1982
94	12380	Submarine duty incentive pay	August 18, 1982
95	12381	Delegation of emergency management functions	September 8, 1982
96	12382	President's National Security Telecommunications Advisory Committee	September 13, 1982
97	12383	Amendments to the Manual for Courts-Martial, United States, 1969 (Revised Edition)	September 23, 1982
98	12384	Establishing an emergency board to investigate a dispute between the Southeastern Pennsylvania Transportation Authority and the Delaware Transportation Authority, and certain labor organizations	October 1, 1982
99	12385	Establishing an emergency board to investigate a dispute between New Jersey Transit Rail Operations, Inc. and certain labor organizations	October 1, 1982
100	12386	Establishing an emergency board to investigate a dispute between the New York Metropolitan Transportation Authority and the Connecticut Department of Transportation, and certain labor organizations	October 1, 1982
101	12387	Adjustments of certain rates of pay and allowances	October 8, 1982
102	12388	United States Information Agency	October 14, 1982
103	12389	Amending the Generalized System of Preferences	October 25, 1982
104	12390	Delegation to the Secretary of State	October 25, 1982
105	12391	Partial suspension of Federal service labor-management relations	November 4, 1982
106	12392	International financial institutions	November 15, 1982
107	12393	Establishing an emergency board to investigate a dispute between the Long Island Rail Road and certain labor organizations	November 16, 1982
108	12394	Incentive pay for hazardous duty	November 18, 1982
109	12395	International Private Enterprise Task Force	November 20, 1982
110	12396	Defense officer personnel management	December 9, 1982
111	12397	National Commission on Social Security Reform	December 23, 1982
112	12398	President's private sector survey on cost control in the Federal Government	December 31, 1982
113	12399	Continuance of certain Federal advisory committees	December 31, 1982

=== 1983 ===
Relative No.	Absolute No.	Title/Description	Date signed
114	12400	President's Commission on Strategic Forces	January 3, 1983
115	12401	Presidential Commission on Indian Reservation Economies	January 14, 1983
116	12402	National Commission on Social Security Reform	January 15, 1983
117	12403	African Development Bank	February 8, 1983
118	12404	Charitable fund-raising	February 10, 1983
119	12405	Establishing an emergency board to investigate a dispute between the Consolidated Rail Corporation and the Brotherhood of Locomotive Engineers	February 14, 1983
120	12406	President's Commission on Strategic Forces	February 18, 1983
121	12407	Federal Regional Councils	February 22, 1983
122	12408	Reports on international organizations	February 23, 1983
123	12409	Nuclear cooperation with EURATOM	March 7, 1983
124	12410	Exclusions from the Federal Labor-Management Relations Program	March 28, 1983
125	12411	Government work space management reforms	March 29, 1983
126	12412	Peace Corps Advisory Council	March 29, 1983
127	12413	Amending the Generalized System of Preferences	March 30, 1983
128	12414	Establishing an emergency board to investigate a dispute between The Long Island Rail Road and certain labor organizations	April 4, 1983
129	12415	Extension of the Presidential Commission on Drunk Driving	April 5, 1983
130	12416	Intergovernmental review of Federal programs	April 8, 1983
131	12417	Strategic and critical materials	May 2, 1983
132	12418	Transfer of functions relating to financial responsibility of vessels for pollution liability	May 5, 1983
133	12419	Implementation of the International Convention on Tonnage Measurement of Ships	May 5, 1983
134	12420	Incentive pay for hazardous duty	May 11, 1983
135	12421	Presidential Commission on the Conduct of United States-Japan Relations	May 12, 1983
136	12422	Level IV of the Executive Schedule	May 20, 1983
137	12423	Foreign assistance and arms control	May 26, 1983
138	12424	President's Commission on Strategic Forces	June 10, 1983
139	12425	International Criminal Police Organizations	June 16, 1983
140	12426	President's Advisory Committee on Women's Business Ownership	June 22, 1983
141	12427	President's Advisory Council on Private Sector Initiatives	June 27, 1983
142	12428	President's Commission on Industrial Competitiveness	June 28, 1983
143	12429	President's Private Sector Survey on Cost Control in the Federal Government	June 28, 1983
144	12430	Reports of Identical Bids	July 6, 1983
145	12431	Level IV of the Executive Schedule	July 8, 1983
146	12432	Minority Business Enterprise Development	July 14, 1983
147	12433	National Bipartisan Commission on Central America	July 19, 1983
148	12434	Alaska Railroad Rates	July 19, 1983
149	12435	President's Commission on Organized Crime	July 28, 1983
150	12436	Payment of certain benefits to survivors of persons who died in or as a result of military service	July 29, 1983
151	12437	Fuel use prohibitions	August 11, 1983
152	12438	Review of increases in rates of basic pay for employees of the Veterans' Administration	August 23, 1983
153	12439	President's Task Force on Food Assistance	September 8, 1983
154	12440	President's Commission on Industrial Competitiveness	September 8, 1983
155	12441	Amending the Generalized System of Preferences	September 20, 1983
156	12442	Presidential Commission on Indian Reservation Economies	September 21, 1983
157	12443	Central Intelligence Agency Retirement and Disability System	September 27, 1983
158	12444	Continuation of export control regulations	October 14, 1983
159	12445	Certification of containers and vehicles for use in international transport	October 17, 1983
160	12446	Foreign Service Retirement and Disability System	October 17, 1983
161	12447	President's private sector survey on cost control in the Federal Government	October 27, 1983
162	12448	Exercise of Authority Under Section 218 of Title 18, United States Code	November 4, 1983
163	12449	National Bipartisan Commission on Central America	November 18, 1983
164	12450	Interagency Committee on Handicapped Employees	December 9, 1983
165	12451	Continuation of export control regulations	December 20, 1983
166	12452	Revised list of quarantinable communicable diseases	December 22, 1983
167	12453	Delegation to the Secretary of State	December 23, 1983
168	12454	President's National Security Telecommunications Advisory Committee	December 29, 1983
169	12455	President's Private Sector Survey on Cost Control in the Federal Government	December 29, 1983
170	12456	Adjustments of certain rates of pay and allowances	December 30, 1983

=== 1984 ===
Relative No.	Absolute No.	Title/Description	Date signed
171	12457	President's Commission on Industrial Competitiveness	January 6, 1984
172	12458	Delegation to the Secretary of State concerning foreign assistance	January 14, 1984
173	12459	Amending the Generalized System of Preferences	January 16, 1984
174	12460	Amendments to the Manual for Courts-Martial, United States, 1969 (Revised Edition)	January 24, 1984
175	12461	Designating a Federal Retirement System Under Pub. L. 98-168	February 17, 1984
176	12462	President's Advisory Committee on Mediation and Conciliation	February 17, 1984
177	12463	Nuclear Cooperation With EURATOM	February 23, 1984
178	12464	Award of the Purple Heart	February 23, 1984
179	12465	Commercial expendable launch vehicle activities	February 24, 1984
180	12466	Reimbursement of Federal employee relocation expenses	February 27, 1984
181	12467	International Boundary and Water Commission, United States and Mexico	March 2, 1984
182	12468	Presidential Advisory Council on the Peace Corps	March 22, 1984
183	12469	East-West Foreign Trade Report	March 26, 1984
184	12470	Continuation of export control regulations	March 30, 1984
185	12471	Amending the Generalized System of Preferences	March 30, 1984
186	12472	Assignment of national security and emergency preparedness telecommunications functions	April 3, 1984
187	12473	Courts-Martial Manual, United States, 1984	April 13, 1984
188	12474	Agreement on Government procurement	April 17, 1984
189	12475	Textile Import Program Implementation	May 9, 1984
190	12476	Presidential Commission on the Conduct of United States-Japan Relations	May 11, 1984
191	12477	Adjustments of certain rates of pay	May 23, 1984
192	12478	Transfer of authority to the Secretary of State to make reimbursements for protection of foreign missions to international organizations	May 23, 1984
193	12479	Management Reform in the Federal Government	May 24, 1984
194	12480	Establishing an emergency board to investigate a dispute between The Long Island Rail Road and the Brotherhood of Locomotive Engineers	June 20, 1984
195	12481	Establishing an emergency board to investigate a dispute between The Long Island Rail Road and the Brotherhood of Railway, Airline and Steamship Clerks, Freight Handlers, Express and Station Employees	June 20, 1984
196	12482	President's Advisory Committee on Women's Business Ownership	June 21, 1984
197	12483	Amending the Generalized System of Preferences	June 25, 1984
198	12484	Amendments to the Manual for Courts-Martial, United States, 1984	July 13, 1984
199	12485	Central Intelligence Agency Retirement and Disability System	July 13, 1984
200	12486	Establishing an emergency board to investigate a dispute between Port Authority Trans-Hudson Corporation and the Brotherhood of Railroad Signalmen	August 24, 1984
201	12487	Adjustments of certain rates of pay	September 14, 1984
202	12488	Amending Executive Order No. 11157 as it relates to incentive pay for hazardous duty	September 27, 1984
203	12489	Continuance of certain Federal advisory committees	September 28, 1984
204	12490	National Commission on Space	October 12, 1984
205	12491	Establishing an emergency board to investigate a dispute between the Long Island Rail Road and the Brotherhood of Locomotive Engineers	October 25, 1984
206	12492	Establishing an emergency board to investigate a dispute between the Long Island Rail Road and the Brotherhood of Railway, Airline and Steamship Clerks, Freight Handlers, Express and Station Employees	October 25, 1984
207	12493	President's Commission on Executive Exchange	December 5, 1984
208	12494	Amending Executive Order No. 11157 as it relates to pay for hazardous duty	December 6, 1984
209	12495	Establishing an emergency board to investigate a dispute between Port Authority Trans-Hudson Corporation and the Brotherhood of Railroad Signalmen	December 21, 1984
210	12496	Adjustments of certain rates of pay and allowances	December 28, 1984
211	12497	President's Advisory Committee on Mediation and Conciliation	December 29, 1984

=== 1985 ===
Relative No.	Absolute No.	Title/Description	Date signed
212	12498	Regulatory planning process	January 4, 1985
213	12499	President's Blue Ribbon Task Group on Nuclear Weapons Program Management	January 18, 1985
214	12500	Delegation to the Secretary of State and the Director of the International Development Cooperation Agency concerning foreign assistance	January 24, 1985
215	12501	Arctic Research	January 28, 1985
216	12502	Chemical Warfare Review Commission	January 28, 1985
217	12503	Presidential Commission on Outdoor Recreation Resources Review	January 28, 1985
218	12504	Protection of semiconductor chip products	January 31, 1985
219	12505	Conversion of appointments	February 12, 1985
220	12506	Nuclear Cooperation With EURATOM	March 4, 1985
221	12507	Continuance of the President's Commission on Organized Crime	March 22, 1985
222	12508	World Tourism Organization	March 22, 1985
223	12509	Technical Review Group on Inertial Confinement Fusion	April 14, 1985
224	12510	Non-foreign area cost-of-living allowances	April 17, 1985
225	12511	President's Child Safety Partnership	April 29, 1985
226	12512	Federal Real Property Management	April 29, 1985
227	12513	Prohibiting trade and certain other transactions involving Nicaragua	May 1, 1985
228	12514	Prescribing the Order of Succession of Officers To Act as Secretary of Defense, Secretary of the Army, Secretary of the Navy, and Secretary of the Air Force	May 14, 1985
229	12515	Amending the Generalized System of Preferences	May 14, 1985
230	12516	President's Commission on Executive Exchange	May 21, 1985
231	12517	Delegation concerning the United States-India Fund for Cultural, Educational, and Scientific Cooperation	May 29, 1985
232	12518	Trade in Services	June 3, 1985
233	12519	Amending the Generalized System of Preferences	June 13, 1985
234	12520	Quarters allowance to Department of Defense employees in Panama	June 19, 1985
235	12521	Offsets in Military-related exports	June 24, 1985
236	12522	Reimbursement of Federal employee relocation expenses	June 24, 1985
237	12523	National White House Conference on Small Business	June 27, 1985
238	12524	Amending the Generalized System of Preferences	July 1, 1985
239	12525	Termination of Emergency Authority for Export Controls	July 12, 1985
240	12526	President's Blue Ribbon Commission on Defense Management	July 15, 1985
241	12527	Repealing Provisions Establishing an Administrative Position in the Food-for-Peace Program	August 7, 1985
242	12528	Presidential Board of Advisors on Private Sector Initiatives	August 8, 1985
243	12529	President's Commission on Americans Outdoors	August 14, 1985
244	12530	Establishment of Nicaraguan Humanitarian Aid Office	August 29, 1985
245	12531	Establishing an emergency board to investigate a dispute between the United Transportation Union and certain railroads represented by the National Carriers' Conference Committee of the National Railway Labor Conference	August 30, 1985
246	12532	Prohibiting trade and certain other transactions involving South Africa	September 9, 1985
247	12533	President's Advisory Committee on Mediation and Conciliation	September 30, 1985
248	12534	Continuance of certain Federal advisory committees	September 30, 1985
249	12535	Prohibition of the importation of the South African krugerrand	October 1, 1985
250	12536	Board of the Foreign Service	October 9, 1985
251	12537	President's Foreign Intelligence Advisory Board	October 28, 1985
252	12538	Imports of refined petroleum products from Libya	November 15, 1985
253	12539	President's Council on Physical Fitness and Sports	December 3, 1985
254	12540	Adjustments of certain rates of pay and allowances	December 30, 1985
255	12541	Amending Executive Order 11157 as it relates to a basic allowance for quarters while on sea duty	December 30, 1985
256	12542	President's Blue Ribbon Commission on Defense Management	December 30, 1985

=== 1986 ===
Relative No.	Absolute No.	Title/Description	Date signed
257	12543	Prohibiting trade and certain transactions involving Libya	January 7, 1986
258	12544	Blocking Libyan Government property in the United States or held by U.S. persons	January 8, 1986
259	12545	National Commission on Space	January 14, 1986
260	12546	Presidential Commission on the Space Shuttle Challenger Accident	February 3, 1986
261	12547	Establishing procedures for facilitating Presidential review of international aviation decisions submitted by the Department of Transportation	February 6, 1986
262	12548	Grazing Fees	February 14, 1986
263	12549	Debarment and Suspension	February 18, 1986
264	12550	Amendments to the Manual for Courts-Martial, United States, 1984	February 19, 1986
265	12551	The President's Export Council	February 21, 1986
266	12552	Productivity Improvement Program for the Federal Government	February 25, 1986
267	12553	Revocation of Various Executive Orders	February 25, 1986
268	12554	Nuclear Cooperation With EURATOM	February 28, 1986
269	12555	Protection of Cultural Property	March 10, 1986
270	12556	Mailing privileges of members of Armed Forces of the United States and of friendly foreign nations	April 16, 1986
271	12557	Establishing an emergency board to investigate disputes between the Maine Central Railroad Company/Portland Terminal Company and certain of their employees represented by the Brotherhood of Maintenance of Way Employees	May 16, 1986
272	12558	Establishing an emergency board to investigate a dispute between the Long Island Rail Road and certain labor organizations representing Its employees	May 16, 1986
273	12559	Exclusions From the Federal-Labor Management Relations Program	May 20, 1986
274	12560	Administration of foreign relations and related functions	May 24, 1986
275	12561	Delegating certain functions of the President relating to Federal civilian employee and contractor travel expenses	July 1, 1986
276	12562	Establishing an emergency board to investigate disputes between certain railroads represented by the National Carriers' Conference Committee of the National Railway Labor Conference and their employees represented by certain labor organizations	July 15, 1986
277	12563	Establishing an emergency board to investigate a dispute between the Long Island Rail Road and certain labor organizations representing its employees	September 12, 1986
278	12564	Drug-Free Federal Workplace	September 15, 1986
279	12565	Prescribing a comprehensive system of financial reporting for officers and employees in the executive branch	September 25, 1986
280	12566	Safety belt use requirements for Federal employees	September 26, 1986
281	12567	Inter-American Investment Corporation, Commission for the Study of Alternatives to the Panama Canal, and Pacific Salmon Commission	October 2, 1986
282	12568	Employment opportunities for military spouses at nonappropriated fund activities	October 2, 1986
283	12569	Management of the Compact of Free Association With the Republic of the Marshall Islands, the Federated States of Micronesia, and the Republic of Palau	October 16, 1986
284	12570	Delegating authority to implement assistance for Central American democracies and the Nicaraquan Democratic Resistance	October 24, 1986
285	12571	Implementation of the Comprehensive Anti-Apartheid Act	October 27, 1986
286	12572	Relations With the Northern Mariana Islands	November 3, 1986
287	12573	Amending Executive Order No. 11157 as it relates to incentive pay for hazardous duty	November 6, 1986
288	12574	Establishing an experimental program within the President's Commission on Executive Exchange	November 20, 1986
289	12575	President's Special Review Board	December 1, 1986
290	12576	Victims of terrorism compensation	December 2, 1986
291	12577	Closing of Government departments and agencies on Friday, December 26, 1986	December 22, 1986
292	12578	Adjustments of certain rates of pay and allowances	December 31, 1986
293	12579	President's Advisory Committee on Mediation and Conciliation	December 31, 1986

=== 1987 ===
Relative No.	Absolute No.	Title/Description	Date signed
294	12580	Superfund Implementation	January 23, 1987
295	12581	President's Special Review Board	January 28, 1987
296	12582	Naturalization requirements exceptions for aliens and non-citizen nationals of the United States who served in the Grenada campaign	February 2, 1987
297	12583	Food for Progress	February 19, 1987
298	12584	President's Special Review Board	February 19, 1987
299	12585	Eligibility of overseas employees for noncompetitive appointment	March 3, 1987
300	12586	Amendments to the Manual for Courts-Martial, United States, 1984	March 3, 1987
301	12587	Nuclear Cooperation With EURATOM	March 9, 1987
302	12588	Action against certain assets of disputed title	March 18, 1987
303	12589	Transfer of annual and sick leave of Federal Employees	March 18, 1987
304	12590	National Drug Policy Board	March 26, 1987
305	12591	Facilitating access to science and technology	April 10, 1987
306	12592	President's Commission on Compensation of Career Federal Executives	April 10, 1987
307	12593	President's Committee on the Arts and the Humanities	April 21, 1987
308	12594	President's Volunteer Action Award	April 28, 1987
309	12595	White House Conference for a Drug Free America	May 5, 1987
310	12596	Noncompetitive conversion to career status of certain employees in professional and administrative career positions	May 7, 1987
311	12597	Establishing procedures for facilitating Presidential review of international aviation decisions by the Department of Transportation	May 13, 1987
312	12598	Victims of terrorism compensation	June 17, 1987
313	12599	Coordination of economic policies for Sub-Saharan Africa	June 23, 1987
314	12600	Predisclosure notification procedures for confidential commercial information	June 23, 1987
315	12601	Presidential Commission on the Human Immunodeficiency Virus Epidemic	June 24, 1987
316	12602	President's Commission on Executive Exchange	July 15, 1987
317	12603	Presidential Commission on the Human Immunodeficiency Virus Epidemic	July 16, 1987
318	12604	Presidential Board of Advisors on Private Sector Initiatives	August 5, 1987
319	12605	Navy and Marine Corps Reserve Officer Promotions	August 12, 1987
320	12606	The Family	September 2, 1987
321	12607	President's Commission on Privatization	September 2, 1987
322	12608	Elimination of unnecessary Executive orders and technical amendments to others	September 9, 1987
323	12609	President's Commission on Compensation of Career Federal Employees	September 23, 1987
324	12610	Continuance of Certain Federal Advisory Committees	September 30, 1987
325	12611	Delegating authority to implement assistance for Central American democracies and the Nicaraguan Democratic Resistance	October 15, 1987
326	12612	Federalism	October 26, 1987
327	12613	Prohibiting Imports From Iran	October 29, 1987
328	12614	Presidential Task Force on Market Mechanisms	November 5, 1987
329	12615	Performance of Commercial Activities	November 19, 1987
330	12616	Providing for the restoration of law and order in the State of Georgia	November 24, 1987
331	12617	President's Advisory Committee on Mediation and Conciliation	December 17, 1987
332	12618	Uniform treatment of Federally funded inventions	December 22, 1987
333	12619	Half-day closing of Government departments and agencies on Thursday, December 24, 1987	December 22, 1987
334	12620	Delegation of authority with respect to the Administration of Justice Program	December 24, 1987
335	12621	President's Task Force on Market Mechanisms	December 29, 1987
336	12622	Adjustments of certain rates of pay and allowances	December 31, 1987

=== 1988 ===
Relative No.	Absolute No.	Title/Description	Date signed
337	12623	Delegating authority to implement assistance to the Nicaraguan Democratic Resistance	January 6, 1988
338	12624	Increasing the number of members on the President's Foreign Intelligence Advisory Board	January 6, 1988
339	12625	Integrity and Efficiency in Federal Programs	January 27, 1988
340	12626	National Defense Stockpile Manager	February 25, 1988
341	12627	Amending the President's Commission on Privatization	February 29, 1988
342	12628	United Nations Industrial Development Organization	March 8, 1988
343	12629	Nuclear Cooperation With EURATOM	March 9, 1988
344	12630	Governmental actions and interference with constitutionally protected property rights	March 15, 1988
345	12631	Working Group on Financial Markets	March 18, 1988
346	12632	Exclusions From the Federal Labor-Management Relations Program	March 23, 1988
347	12633	Amending the Code of Conduct for Members of the Armed Forces of the United States	March 28, 1988
348	12634	Delegating authority to provide assistance and support for peace, democracy, and reconciliation in Central America	April 1, 1988
349	12635	Prohibiting certain transactions with respect to Panama	April 8, 1988
350	12636	Establishing an emergency board to investigate a dispute between the Chicago and North Western Transportation Company and certain of its employees represented by the United Transportation Union	April 20, 1988
351	12637	Productivity improvement program for the Federal Government	April 27, 1988
352	12638	Delegation of functions relating to the implementation of the Inter-American Convention on Letters Rogatory and Additional Protocol	April 28, 1988
353	12639	Administration of foreign relations and related functions	May 6, 1988
354	12640	The President's Committee on Employment of People With Disabilities	May 10, 1988
355	12641	Designating certain facilities of the National Aeronautics and Space Administration in the State of Mississippi as the John C. Stennis Space Center	May 20, 1988
356	12642	Designation of the Secretary of Defense as the Presidential designee Under Title I of the Uniformed and Overseas Citizens Absentee Voting Act	June 8, 1988
357	12643	International Committee of the Red Cross	June 23, 1988
358	12644	Establishing an Emergency Board To Investigate a Dispute Between the Port Authority Trans-Hudson Corporation and Certain of its Employees Represented by the Transportation Communications Union-Carmen Division	July 9, 1988
359	12645	Amending Executive Order 12364, Relating to the Presidential Management Intern Program	July 12, 1988
360	12646	Establishing an emergency board to investigate a dispute between the Port Authority Trans-Hudson Corporation and certain of its employees Represented by the International Brotherhood of Electrical Workers	July 13, 1988
361	12647	Multilateral Investment Guarantee Agency	August 2, 1988
362	12648	Relating to the Implementation of the Convention on the Civil Aspects of International Child Abduction	August 11, 1988
363	12649	Offsets in military-related exports	August 11, 1988
364	12650	Establishing an emergency board to investigate a dispute between the Port Authority Trans-Hudson Corporation and certain of its employees represented by the Brotherhood of Locomotive Engineers	September 9, 1988
365	12651	Offices of the Commission of the European Communities	September 9, 1988
366	12652	Return of authority to administer Federal Employees' Compensation Act to the Department of Labor from the Panama Canal Commission	September 19, 1988
367	12653	Amending Executive Order 11183, relating to the President's Commission on White House Fellowships	September 29, 1988
368	12654	Delegating authority to provide assistance for the Nicaraguan Resistance	October 7, 1988
369	12655	Establishing an emergency board to investigate a dispute between the Port Authority Trans-Hudson Corporation and certain of its employees represented by the Transportation Communications Union-Carmen Division	November 7, 1988
370	12656	Assignment of emergency preparedness responsibilities	November 18, 1988
371	12657	Federal Emergency Management Agency assistance in emergency preparedness planning at commercial nuclear power plants	November 18, 1988
372	12658	President's Commission on Catastrophic Nuclear Accidents	November 18, 1988
373	12659	Delegation of authority regarding the naval petroleum and oil shale reserves	December 15, 1988
374	12660	National Microgravity Research Board	December 16, 1988
375	12661	Implementing the Omnibus Trade and Competitiveness Act of 1988 and Related International Trade Matters	December 27, 1988
376	12662	Implementing the United States-Canada Free-Trade Implementation Act	December 31, 1988

=== 1989 ===
Relative No.	Absolute No.	Title/Description	Date signed
377	12663	Adjustments of certain rates of pay and allowances	January 6, 1989
378	12664	Establishing an emergency board to investigate a dispute between the Port Authority Trans-Hudson Corporation and certain of its employees represented by the Brotherhood of Locomotive Engineers	January 6, 1989
379	12665	Amending Executive Order No. 12658, the President's Commission on Catastrophic Nuclear Accidents	January 12, 1989
380	12666	Exclusions From the Federal Labor-Management Relations Program	January 12, 1989
381	12667	Presidential Records	January 18, 1989

== See also ==
- List of executive actions by Jimmy Carter, EO #11967–12286 (1977–1981)
- List of executive actions by George H. W. Bush, EO #12668–12833 (1989–1993)
