= Executive Order 13438 =

2007 United States executive order

Executive Order 13438, titled Blocking Property of Certain Persons Who Threaten Stabilization Efforts in Iraq, was an executive order signed by President George W. Bush on July 17, 2007. Its stated attempt is to reduce the flow of material support for insurgents and terrorists in the Iraq War. This order grants the administration the power to freeze the assets of an abstract but broadly defined group of people who threaten the stability of Iraq.

The Order provides a means by which to disrupt support for terrorists and insurgent groups in Iraq or groups or individuals "determined to have committed, or to pose a significant risk of committing, an act or acts of violence that have the purpose or effect of threatening the peace or stability of Iraq or the Government of Iraq or undermining efforts to promote economic reconstruction and political reform in Iraq or to provide humanitarian assistance to the Iraqi people."

This executive order is presented as an extension of Executive Order 13303 and Executive Order 13315 supporting the pacification, stabilization, and rebuilding of Iraq. It is similar to Executive Order 13224, which dealt with financing and support of terrorist groups and networks worldwide.

President Barack Obama has extended the national emergency under which Executive Order 13438 was issued several times, most recently on May 17, 2013.
