= List of executive actions by George H. W. Bush =

There are various kinds of executive actions that United States presidents may take.

Executive orders are issued to help officers and agencies of the executive branch manage the operations within the federal government itself. Presidential memoranda are closely related, and have the force of law on the Executive Branch, but are generally considered less prestigious. Presidential memoranda do not have an established process for issuance, and unlike executive orders, they are not numbered. A presidential determination is a determination resulting in an official policy or position of the executive branch of the United States government. A presidential proclamation is a statement issued by a president on a matter of public policy issued under specific authority granted to the president by Congress and typically on a matter of widespread interest. Administrative orders are signed documents such as notices, letters, and orders that can be issued to conduct administrative operations of the federal government. A presidential notice or a presidential sequestration order can also be issued. National security directives^{1} operate like executive orders, but are only in the area of national security. They have been issued by different presidents under various names.

Listed below are executive orders numbered 12668–12833 signed by United States President George H. W. Bush (1989–1993). He issued 166 executive orders. His executive orders are also listed on Wikisource, along with his presidential proclamations.

Signature of George H. W. Bush

== Executive orders ==
=== 1989 ===
Relative No.	Absolute No.	Title/Description	Date signed
1	12668	President's Commission on Federal Ethics Law Reform	January 25, 1989
2	12669	Organization of Eastern Caribbean States	February 20, 1989
3	12670	Nuclear Cooperation With EURATOM\	March 9, 1989
4	12671	Exclusion of the Customs Office of Enforcement from the Federal Labor-Management Relations Program	March 14, 1989
5	12672	Interagency Committee on Handicapped Employees	March 21, 1989
6	12673	Delegation of disaster relief and emergency assistance functions	March 23, 1989
7	12674	Principles of Ethical Conduct for Government Officers and Employees	April 12, 1989
8	12675	Establishing the National Space Council	April 20, 1989
9	12676	Delegating Authority to Provide Assistance for the Nicaraguan Resistance	April 26, 1989
10	12677	Historically Black Colleges and Universities	April 28, 1989
11	12678	Level IV of the Executive Schedule	April 28, 1989
12	12679	Level IV of the Executive Schedule	June 23, 1989
13	12680	Administration of Foreign Assistance and Related Functions and Arms Export Controls	July 5, 1989
14	12681	Exclusions From the Federal Labor-Management Relations Program	July 6, 1989
15	12682	Commission on Alternative Utilization of Military Facilities	July 7, 1989
16	12683	Prescribing Regulations Relating to Certain Travel Time of Members of the Uniformed Services Called to Active Duty	July 21, 1989
17	12684	Conforming the Central Intelligence Agency and Civil Service Retirement and Disability Systems	July 27, 1989
18	12685	Noncompetitive Conversion of Personal Assistants to Employees with Disabilities	July 28, 1989
19	12686	President's Commission on Aviation Security and Terrorism	August 4, 1989
20	12687	President's Education Policy Advisory Committee	August 15, 1989
21	12688	Transfer of Authority Choctawhatchee National Forest, Florida	August 15, 1989
22	12689	Debarment and Suspension	August 16, 1989
23	12690	Providing for the Restoration of Law and Order in the Virgin Islands	September 20, 1989
24	12691	President's Advisory Committee on the Points of Light Initiative Foundation	September 23, 1989
25	12692	Continuance of Certain Federal Advisory Committees	September 29, 1989
26	12693	Exclusion of the Defense Mapping Agency Reston Center and Elements Under the Joint Special Operations Command From the Federal Labor-Management Relations Program	September 29, 1989
27	12694	Amending Executive Order No. 12345	October 11, 1989
28	12695	Delegation of Debt Relief Authority	November 1, 1989
29	12696	President's Drug Advisory Council	November 13, 1989
30	12697	Extending the National Commission on Superconductivity	December 22, 1989
31	12698	Adjustments of Certain Rates of Pay and Allowances	December 23, 1989

=== 1990 ===
Relative No.	Absolute No.	Title/Description	Date signed
32	12699	Seismic Safety of Federal and Federally Assisted or Regulated New Building Construction	January 5, 1990
33	12700	President's Council of Advisors on Science and Technology	January 19, 1990
34	12701	Amending Executive Order No. 12334	February 14, 1990
35	12702	Waiver Under the Trade Act of 1974 With Respect to Czechoslovakia	February 20, 1990
36	12703	Support for East European Democracy (SEED) Program	February 20, 1990
37	12704	Amendments to Executive Orders Nos. 11830, 12367, and 12692	February 26, 1990
38	12705	Extending the President's Commission on Aviation Security and Terrorism	March 3, 1990
39	12706	Nuclear Cooperation With EURATOM	March 9, 1990
40	12707	Termination of Emergency With Respect to Nicaragua	March 13, 1990
41	12708	Amendments to the Manual for Courts-Martial, United States, 1984	March 23, 1990
42	12709	Increasing the Membership of the President's Council on Physical Fitness and Sports	April 4, 1990
43	12710	Termination of Emergency With Respect to Panama	April 5, 1990
44	12711	Deferred deportation of Chinese nationals and their direct dependents in response to the Tiananmen Square protests of 1989.	April 11, 1990
45	12712	Adding the Secretary of Energy to the National Space Council	April 26, 1990
46	12713	Report Required by Section 502 of the Automotive Products Trade Act of 1965	May 1, 1990
47	12714	Establishing an Emergency Board To Investigate Disputes Between Certain Railroads Represented by the National Carriers' Conference Committee of the National Railway Labor Conference and Their Employees Represented by Certain Labor Organizations	May 3, 1990
48	12715	Determination Under Section 2606 of Title 10, United States Code, for Support of Scouting Activities Overseas	May 3, 1990
49	12716	Extending the National Commission on Superconductivity	May 24, 1990
50	12717	Revoking Executive Order No. 12691	June 18, 1990
51	12718	President's Advisory Commission on the Public Service	June 29, 1990
52	12719	President's Commission on the Federal Appointment Process	July 11, 1990
53	12720	President's Council on Rural America	July 18, 1990
54	12721	Eligibility of Overseas Employees for Noncompetitive Appointments	August 1, 1990
55	12722	Blocking Iraqi Government Property and Prohibiting Transactions With Iraq	August 2, 1990
56	12723	Blocking Kuwaiti Government Property	August 2, 1990
57	12724	Blocking Iraqi Government Property and Prohibiting Transactions With Iraq	August 9, 1990
58	12725	Blocking Kuwaiti Government Property and Prohibiting Transactions With Kuwait	August 9, 1990
59	12726	Waiver Under the Trade Act of 1974 With Respect to the German Democratic Republic	August 15, 1990
60	12727	Ordering the Selected Reserve of the Armed Forces to Active Duty	August 22, 1990
61	12728	Delegating the President's Authority to Suspend any Provision of Law Relating to the Promotion, Retirement, or Separation of Members of the Armed Forces	August 22, 1990
62	12729	Educational Excellence for Hispanic Americans	September 24, 1990
63	12730	Continuation of Export Control Regulations	September 30, 1990
64	12731	Principles of Ethical Conduct for Government Officers and Employees	October 17, 1990
65	12732	International Fund for Agricultural Development	1990-10-31
66	12733	Authorizing the Extension of the Period of Active Duty of Personnel of the Selected Reserve of the Armed Forces	1990-11-13
67	12734	National Emergency Construction Authority	1990-11-14
68	12735	Chemical and Biological Weapons Proliferation	November 16, 1990
69	12736	Adjustments of Certain Rates of Pay and Allowances	December 12, 1990
70	12737	President's Commission on Environmental Quality	December 12, 1990
71	12738	Administration of Foreign Assistance and Related Functions and Arms Export Controls	December 14, 1990
72	12739	Half-Day Closing of Government Departments and Agencies on Monday, December 24, 1990	December 17, 1990
73	12740	Waiver Under the Trade Act of 1974 With Respect to the Soviet Union	December 29, 1990
74	12741	Extending the President's Education Policy Advisory Committee	December 31, 1990

=== 1991 ===
Relative No.	Absolute No.	Title/Description	Date signed
75	12742	National Security Industrial Responsiveness	January 8, 1991
76	12743	Ordering the Ready Reserve of the Armed Forces to Active Duty	January 18, 1991
77	12744	Designation of Arabian Peninsula Areas, Airspace, and Adjacent Waters as a Combat Zone	January 21, 1991
78	12745	Waiver Under the Trade Act of 1974 with Respect to Bulgaria	January 22, 1991
79	12746	Waiver Under the Trade Act of 1974 with Respect to Mongolia	January 23, 1991
80	12747	National Nutrition Monitoring Advisory Council	January 25, 1991
81	12748	Providing for Federal Pay Administration	February 1, 1991
82	12749	Additions to Level IV of the Executive Schedule	February 4, 1991
83	12750	Designation of Arabian Peninsula Areas, Airspace, and Adjacent Waters as the Persian Gulf Desert Shield Area	February 14, 1991
84	12751	Health Care Services for Operation Desert Storm	February 14, 1991
85	12752	Implementation of the Agricultural Trade Development and Assistance Act of 1954, as Amended, and the Food for Progress Act of 1985, as Amended	February 25, 1991
86	12753	Nuclear Cooperation With EURATOM	March 8, 1991
87	12754	Establishing the Southwest Asia Service Medal	March 12, 1991
88	12755	Administration of Export Controls	March 12, 1991
89	12756	Continuance of the President's Drug Advisory Council	March 18, 1991
90	12757	Implementation of the Enterprise for the Americas Initiative	March 19, 1991
91	12758	Addition to Level IV of the Executive Schedule	April 5, 1991
92	12759	Federal Energy Management	April 7, 1991
93	12760	President's Commission on Executive Exchange	May 2, 1991
94	12761	Establishment of the President's Environment and Conservation Challenge Awards	May 21, 1991
95	12762	Amendment Relating to Basic Allowance for Quarters	June 4, 1991
96	12763	Facilitating the Operation of the Advisory Commission on Conferences in Ocean Shipping	June 4, 1991
97	12764	Federal Salary Council	June 5, 1991
98	12765	Delegation of Certain Defense Related Authorities of the President to the Secretary of Defense	June 11, 1991
99	12766	European Bank for Reconstruction and Development and European Space Agency	June 18, 1991
100	12767	Amendments to the Manual for Courts-Martial, United States, 1984	June 27, 1991
101	12768	Extension of the President's Council of Advisors on Science and Technology	June 28, 1991
102	12769	Implementation of Section 311(a) of the Comprehensive Anti-Apartheid Act	July 10, 1991
103	12770	Metric Usage in Federal Governmental Programs	July 25, 1991
104	12771	Revoking Earlier Orders With Respect to Kuwait	July 25, 1991
105	12772	Waiver under the Trade Act of 1974 with respect to Romania	August 17, 1991
106	12773	Amending Executive Order 10480	September 26, 1991
107	12774	Continuance of Certain Federal Advisory Committees	September 27, 1991
108	12775	Prohibiting Certain transactions with respect to Haiti	October 4, 1991
109	12776	Extending the National Defense Service Medal to Members of the Reserve Components of the Armed Forces of the United States During the Period of the Persian Gulf Crisis	October 8, 1991
110	12777	Implementation of Section 311 of the Federal Water Pollution Control Act of October 18, 1972, as Amended, and the Oil Pollution Act of 1990	October 18, 1991
111	12778	Civil Justice Reform	October 23, 1991
112	12779	Prohibiting Certain Transactions With Respect to Haiti	October 28, 1991
113	12780	Federal agency recycling and the Council on Federal Recycling and Procurement Policy	October 31, 1991
114	12781	Delegation of Functions and Authorities, Development of Requirements and Regulations, and Correction of Title	November 20, 1991
115	12782	Amending Executive Order No. 12594	November 21, 1991
116	12783	Extending the President's Council on Rural America	December 17, 1991
117	12784	Delegation of Authority Regarding the Naval Petroleum and Oil Shale Reserves	December 19, 1991
118	12785	Extending the President's Education Policy Advisory Committee	December 26, 1991
119	12786	Adjustments of Certain Rates of Pay and Allowances	December 26, 1991
120	12787	The Order of Succession of Officers to Act as Secretary of Defense	December 31, 1991

=== 1992 ===
Relative No.	Absolute No.	Title/Description	Date signed
121	12788	Defense Economic Adjustment Program	January 15, 1992
122	12789	Delegation of Reporting Functions Under the Immigration Reform and Control Act of 1986	February 10, 1992
123	12790	Amending the Order Establishing the Southwest Asia Service Medal	March 3, 1992
124	12791	Nuclear Cooperation With EURATOM	March 9, 1992
125	12792	National Commission on America's Urban Families	March 12, 1992
126	12793	Continuing the Presidential Service Certificate and the Presidential Service Badge	March 20, 1992
127	12794	Establishing an Emergency Board to Investigate Disputes Between Certain Railroads and Their Employees Represented by the International Association of Machinists and Aerospace Workers	March 31, 1992
128	12795	Establishing an Emergency Board to Investigate a Dispute Between the Consolidated Rail Corporation and its Employees Represented by the Brotherhood of Maintenance of Way Employes	March 31, 1992
129	12796	Establishing an Emergency Board to Investigate Disputes Between the National Railroad Passenger Corporation and its Employees Represented by Certain Labor Organizations	March 31, 1992
130	12797	Review of Increases in Rates of Basic Pay for Certain Employees of the Department of Veterans Affairs and Other Agencies	April 3, 1992
131	12798	Waiver Under the Trade Act of 1974 With Respect to Armenia	April 6, 1992
132	12799	Navy and Marine Corps Reserve Officer Promotions	April 7, 1992
133	12800	Notification of Employee Rights Concerning Payment of Union Dues or Fees	April 13, 1992
134	12801	Barring Overflight, Takeoff, and Landing of Aircraft Flying to or from Libya	April 15, 1992
135	12802	Waiver Under the Trade Act of 1974 With Respect to the Republic of Byelarus, the Republic of Kyrgyzstan, and the Russian Federation	April 16, 1992
136	12803	Infrastructure Privatization	April 30, 1992
137	12804	Providing for the Restoration of Law and Order in the City and County of Los Angeles, and Other Districts of California	May 1, 1992
138	12805	Integrity and Efficiency in Federal Programs	May 11, 1992
139	12806	Establishment of a Fetal Tissue Bank	May 19, 1992
140	12807	Interdiction of Illegal Aliens	May 24, 1992
141	12808	Blocking "Yugoslav Government" Property and Property of the Governments of Serbia and Montenegro	May 30, 1992
142	12809	Waiver Under the Trade Act of 1974 With Respect to Albania, Azerbaijan, Georgia, Kazakhstan, Moldova, Ukraine, and Uzbekistan	June 3, 1992
143	12810	Blocking Property of and Prohibiting Transactions With the Federal Republic of Yugoslavia (Serbia and Montenegro). Noteworthy for its role in the extradition attempts of Bobby Fischer. Later terminated in 2003.	June 5, 1992
144	12811	Waiver Under the Trade Act of 1974 With Respect to Tajikistan and Turkmenistan	June 24, 1992
145	12812	Declassification and Release of Materials Pertaining to Prisoners of War and Missing in Action	July 22, 1992
146	12813	President's Commission on Management of the Agency for International Development (AID) Programs	August 4, 1992
147	12814	Additions to Level IV of the Executive Schedule for Members of the Chemical Safety and Hazard Investigation Board	September 10, 1992
148	12815	Extending the President's Commission on Management of the Agency for International Development (AID) Programs	September 30, 1992
149	12816	Management Improvement in the Federal Government	October 14, 1992
150	12817	Transfer of Certain Iraqi Government Assets Held by Domestic Banks	October 21, 1992
151	12818	Open Bidding on Federal and Federally Funded Construction Projects	October 23, 1992
152	12819	Establishing a Presidential Youth Award for Community Service	October 28, 1992
153	12820	Facilitating Federal Employees' Participation in Community Service Activities	November 5, 1992
154	12821	Improving Mathematics and Science Education in Support of the National Education Goals	November 16, 1992
155	12822	Providing for Payment of Separate Maintenance Allowances to Employees Assigned to Johnston Island	November 16, 1992
156	12823	Amendments to Executive Order No. 12757 - Implementation of the Enterprise for the Americas Initiative	December 3, 1992
157	12824	Establishing the Transportation Distinguished Service Medal	December 7, 1992
158	12825	Half-Day Closing of Government Departments and Agencies on Thursday, December 24, 1992	December 18, 1992
159	12826	Adjustments of Certain Rates of Pay and Allowances	December 30, 1992
160	12827	Amendment to Executive Order No. 12792	December 30, 1992

=== 1993 ===
Relative No.	Absolute No.	Title/Description	Date signed
161	12828	Delegation of Certain Personnel Management Authorities	January 5, 1993
162	12829	National Industrial Security Program	January 6, 1993
163	12830	Establishing the Military Outstanding Volunteer Service Medal	January 9, 1993
164	12831	Additional Measures With Respect to the Federal Republic of Yugoslavia (Serbia and Montenegro)	January 15, 1993
165	12832	Amendments Relating to the National Research Council	January 19, 1993
166	12833	Addition to Level V of the Executive Schedule: Transition Manager for the United States Enrichment Corporation	January 19, 1993

== See also ==
- List of executive actions by Ronald Reagan, EO #12287–12667 (1981–1989)
- List of executive actions by Bill Clinton, EO #12834–13197 (1993–2001)
