= Executive Order 13010 =

1996 United States executive order

On July 15, 1996, President Bill Clinton issued Executive Order 13010. This executive order addressed the concerns regarding infrastructure by listing critical infrastructures, identifying threats to critical infrastructures, and establishing the President's Commission on Critical Infrastructure Protection. The findings of the Commission, Critical Foundations: Protecting America's Infrastructures. Unclassified are available from The National Security Archive at The George Washington University.

== Critical infrastructure ==
Critical Infrastructure stated in EO 13010:

- Telecommunications
- Electrical Power Systems
- Gas and Oil Storage and Transportation
- Banking and Finance
- Transportation
- Water Supply Systems
- Emergency Services
  - Medical
  - Police
  - Fire
  - Rescue
- Continuity of Government

== Threats ==
Threats to critical infrastructures stated in EO 13010:

- Physical Threats to tangible property
- Cyber Threats of electronic, radio-frequency, or computer-based attacks on the information or communications components that control critical infrastructures

== Literary mention ==
Arthur C. Clarke said in the "Sources" section of his novel, 3001: The Final Odyssey;

"As the result of a series of Senate Hearings on Computer Security in June 1996, on 15 July 1996 President Clinton signed Executive Order 13010 to deal with 'computer-based attacks on the information or communications components that control critical infrastructures ("cyber threats").' This will set up a task force to counter cyberterrorism, and will have representatives from the CIA, NSA, defense agencies, etc."
