= Executive Order 13397 =

2006 United States executive order

Executive Order 13397, signed by President George W. Bush on March 7, 2006, concerns the "Responsibilities of the Department of Homeland Security with Respect to Faith-Based and Community Initiatives". The executive order directs the Department of Homeland Security to "coordinate a national effort to expand opportunities for faith-based and other community organizations and to strengthen their capacity to better meet America's social and community needs."
