= Executive Order 13303 =

2003 United States executive order

Executive Order 13303 was issued on May 22, 2003, by United States President George W. Bush to protect the Development Fund for Iraq for the rebuilding of Iraq from any legal attachments or liens. Further, it protects Iraqi oil products and interests and ownership by US persons (defined to include US corporations) from attachment as well. Executive Order 13303 also terminates sanctions specified in EO 12722, EO 12724, EO 13290, as it applies to the development fund. In effect, EO 13303 provides an extraordinarily broad legal shield for any and all contractors and mercenaries working in Iraq on behalf of US corporations in any oil related enterprise. The Executive Order also declares a national emergency to deal with the threat to a peaceful reconstruction of Iraq, which US Presidents have renewed every year since, most recently in May 2026.

The order's full title is Executive Order Protecting the Development Fund for Iraq and Certain Other Property in Which Iraq Has An Interest.

== Effects of EO 13303 ==
The primary effect of EO 13303 is the legal protection of US oil companies. EO 13303 is part of a broader endeavor by the Bush administration to exert control over Iraqi oil revenues. The plan centers on the Development Fund for Iraq, created by the United Nations and nominally controlled by the United States, with advice from the World Bank and the International Monetary Fund (IMF).

The second part of the plan is EO 13303, providing absolute legal protection for US interests in Iraqi oil.

== Controversy ==
The Arizona Law Review published an essay discussing the unconstitutionality of the order, citing Dames & Moore v. Regan as limiting the power of executive orders such as this.

Critics of EO 13303 contend new debt for Iraq will accrue from the new Development Fund for Iraq. They say that it will allow opportunities for grave abuses because it offers little illuminating context and its tone suggests the language should be read quite broadly. These concerns stem from the apparent likelihood the fund will be used to leverage US government and corporate interests.

The United Nations Security Council approved Resolution 1483 on May 22, 2003, ending economic sanctions against Iraq while clearing a path for the transfer of over US$1 billion from the Oil-for-Food program as seed money for establishment of the development fund. Critics are also alarmed because all proceeds from the sale of Iraqi oil and natural gas are to be placed into the fund, noting developing countries have amassed huge debts in exchange for selling out their natural resources to powerful corporations. This paradigm, they contend, cloaks corporate welfare and neocolonialism in terms of 'poverty alleviation', and now in Iraq as 'humanitarian assistance'.

There are differences between the original text (UN Security Council Resolution 1483) and EO 13303, which may lead a court to hold implementation is overbroad.

== See also ==
- List of executive actions by George W. Bush
- Executive Order 13290 – issued by President Bush on March 20, 2003 to confiscate Iraqi assets under U.S. jurisdiction, president's first use of such power under the USA PATRIOT Act.
- KPMG audit of the Development Fund for Iraq
- Downing Street memo
- List of national emergencies in the United States
