= Freedom of information laws in the United States =

In the United States, freedom of information legislation exists at all levels of government: federal level, state level, and local level.

== Federal level ==
Since the founding of the United States, the public's right to know the affairs of their government has been foundational to democracy. James Madison wrote during the United States Constitutional Convention, "The right of freely examining public characters and measures and free communication, is the only effective guardian of every other right."

Several federal laws have strengthened the public's ability to access public records. The most important was the Freedom of Information Act, signed into law on July 4, 1966, by President Lyndon Johnson. Other federal laws dealing with freedom of information include:

- Administrative Procedure Act PL 79-404; 1946
- Freedom of Information Act PL 85-619; 1966
- Federal Advisory Committee Act PL 92-463; 1972
- Congressional Budget and Impoundment Control Act PL 93-344; 1974
- Government in the Sunshine Act PL 94-409; 1976
- Inspector General Act PL 95-452; 1978
- Ethics in Government Act PL 95-521; 1978
- Presidential Records Act PL 95-591; 1978
- Electronic Freedom of Information Act Amendments PL 104-231; 1996

== State legislation ==
All fifty U.S. states and the District of Columbia also have freedom of information laws that govern the public's access to government records at state and local levels. These laws go by many different names including Sunshine Laws, Public Records Laws, Open Records Laws, etc. Additionally, Open Meeting Laws govern the public's access to meetings of public officials or appointed boards.

All Freedom of Information style laws supports the ideal that in a democracy, people have the right to know the business of their government. However, the laws vary in scope and strength among jurisdictions. For example, Florida's Sunshine Law creates both a statutory and constitutional right to access whereas many states only provide the statutory right. Additionally, while a state may have strong legislation the state's compliance with its own laws may negatively impact the public's ability to access records.

=== Freedom of Information laws by state and territory ===
State	Freedom of Information Law	Code Section	First Enacted	Who May Request Records
Alabama	Alabama Public Records Law	Al. Code §§ 36-12-40; 36-12-41	1923	Any citizen
Alaska	Alaska Public Records Act	A.S. §§ 40.25.110 to 40.25.125; 40.25.151	1900	Any person
American Samoa	American Samoa Public Records Act	A.S.C.A. §§ 2.0101 et seq.	1984	Any person
Arizona	Arizona Public Records Law	A.R.S. §§ 39–121.01 to 39–121.03	1901	Any person
Arkansas	Arkansas Freedom of Information Act	Ark. Code Ann. §§ 25-19-101 to 25-19-111	1967	Citizens of the state/commonwealth
California	California Public Records Act	Gov't Code §§ 7920.000 to 7931.000 (Note: Originally Gov't Code §§ 6250 to 6276.48 until January 1, 2023.)	1968	Any person
Colorado	Colorado Open Records Act	C.R.S. §§ 24-72-200.1 to 24-72-205.5	1969	Any person
Connecticut	Connecticut Freedom of Information Act	Connecticut General Statutes Chapter 14 §§ 1–200 to 1-242	1975	Any person
Delaware	Delaware Freedom of Information Act	Tit. 29, §§ 10001 to 10007; 10112	1977	Citizens of the state/commonwealth
District of Columbia	Freedom of Information Act	DC Official Code §§ 2–531 to 2-540	1974	Any person
Florida	Florida Sunshine Law	Fla. Stat. §§ 119.01 to 119.19	1967	Any person
Georgia	Georgia Open Records Act	O.C.G.A. §§ 50-18-70 to 50-18-103	1959	Citizens of the state/commonwealth
Guam	Guam Sunshine Reform Act of 1999	5 GCA §§ 10101 to 10125	1999	Any person
Hawaii	Uniform Information Practices Act (Modified)	Haw. Rev. Stat. §§ 92F-1 to 92F-43	1975	Any person
Idaho	Idaho Public Records Act	Idaho Code §§ 74–101 to 74-126	1990	Any person
Illinois	Illinois Freedom of Information Act	ILCS 5 §§ 140/1 to 140/11.6	1984	Any person
Indiana	Access to Public Records Act	IN Code §§ 5-14-3-1 to 5-14-3-10	1983	Any person
Iowa	Iowa Open Records Law	Iowa Code §§ 22.1 to 22.16	1967	Any person
Kansas	Kansas Open Records Act	KSA §§ 45–215 to 45-524	1984	Any person
Kentucky	Kentucky Open Records Act	Kentucky Revised Statute Chapter §§ 61.870 to 61.884	1976	From Kentucky: "an individual residing in Kentucky, a domestic business with a location in Kentucky (or an out-of-state business registered with the Secretary of State), a person who works in Kentucky, a person or business that owns real property within Kentucky, a person or business authorized to act on behalf of a Kentucky resident, or a news-gathering organization"; inmates have some restrictions; non-Kentucky people may request records, but their requests can be denied
Louisiana	Louisiana Public Records Law	La.R.S. §§ 44:31 to 44:41	1940	Any person 18 or older
Maine	Maine Freedom of Access Act	Tit. 1, §§ 400 to 434	1959	Any person
Maryland	Maryland Public Information Act	Gen. Provis. §§ 4–101 to 4-601	1970	Any person
Massachusetts	Massachusetts Public Records Law	Mass. Gen. Laws ch. 66, §§ 1 to 21	1897	Any person
Michigan	Michigan Freedom of Information Act	Mich. Comp. Laws Ann. §§ 15.231 to 15.246	1977	Any person
Minnesota	Minnesota Data Practices Act	Minn. Statutes §§ 13.01 to 13.99 Ch. 13 Appendix	1974	Any person
Mississippi	Mississippi Public Records Act	Miss. Code Ann. §§ 25-61-1 to 25-61-19	1983	Any person
Missouri	Missouri Public Records Act	Mo. Code §§ 109.180; 610.010 to 610.225	1961	Citizens of the state/commonwealth
Montana	Montana Public Records Act	Montana Code §§ 2-6-101 to 2-6-1020	1895	Any person
Nebraska	Nebraska Public Records Law	Nebraska Statutes §§ 84–712 to 84-712.09	1866	Any person
Nevada	Nevada Open Records Act	N.R.S. §§ 239.010-239.340	1911	Any person
New Hampshire	Right to Know Law	R.S.A. Ch. 91-A:1 to 91-A:10	1967	Any citizen
New Jersey	New Jersey Open Public Records Act	N.J.S.A. §§ 47:1A-1 to 47:1A-13	2002	Citizens of the state/commonwealth
New Mexico	Inspection of Public Records Act	NMSA §§ 14-2-1 to 14-2-12	1993	Any person
New York	New York Freedom of Information Law	Pub. Off. §§ 84 to 90	1974	Any person
North Carolina	North Carolina Public Records Law	NCGS Chapter 132–1 to 132-11	1995	Any person
North Dakota	Open Records Statute	NDCC §§ 44-04-18 to 44-04-32	1957	Any person
Northern Mariana Islands	Open Government Act of 1992	1 CMC §§ 9901 to 9910	1992	Any person
Ohio	Ohio Open Records Law	Ohio Rev. Code §§ 149.43 to 149.45; 2743.75	1963	Any person
Oklahoma	Oklahoma Open Records Act	Title 51 Oklahoma Statutes §§ 24A.1 to 24A.32	1999	Any person
Oregon	Oregon Public Records Law	O.R.S. §§ 192.311 to 192.513	1973	Any person
Pennsylvania	Right-to-Know Law	65 Pennsylvania Statute §§ 67.101 to 67.1310	1957	Any legal resident of the United States
Puerto Rico	Puerto Rico Transparency and Access to Public Information Act	Law No. 141-2019	2019	Any person
Rhode Island	Rhode Island Access to Public Records Act	P.L. §§ 38-2-1 to 38-2-16	1979	Any person
South Carolina	South Carolina Freedom of Information Act	S.C. Code Ann. §§ 30-4-10 to 30-4-165	1974	Any person
South Dakota	South Dakota Sunshine Law	SDCL Chapter 1-27-1 to 1-27-48	2009	Any person
Tennessee	Tennessee Open Records Act	Tenn. Code Ann. §§ 10-7-503 to 10-7-508	1957	Citizens of the state/commonwealth
Texas	Texas Public Information Act	Gov't §§ 552.001 to 552.376	1973	Any person
Utah	Government Records Access and Management Act	Utah Code Title 63G-2-101 to 63G-2-804	1991	Any person
Vermont	Vermont Open Records Law	Vermont Statute Tit. 1, §§ 315 to 320	1976	Any person
Virginia	Virginia Freedom of Information Act	Code of Virginia §§ 2.2-3700 to 2.2-3715	1968	Citizens of the state/commonwealth
Virgin Islands	Virgin Islands Sunshine Act	V.I. Code tit. 3, §§ 881–884	1976	Any person
Washington	Washington Public Records Act	RCW §§ 42.56.001 to 42.56.904	1972	Any person
West Virginia	West Virginia Freedom of Information Act	W.Va. Code §§ 29B-1-1 to 29B-1-7	1977	Any person
Wisconsin	Wisconsin Open Records Law	Wisconsin Statute §§ 19.21 to 19.39	1981	Any person
Wyoming	Wyoming Sunshine Law	Wyo. Stat. §§ 16-4-201 to 16-4-205	1983	Any person

=== High-volume requests ===
Since 2020, election officials across the U.S. have reported an overwhelming increase in records requests from apparent election deniers attempting to disrupt the functioning of local and county election offices. Often unreasonably broad, repetitive, or based on misinformation, the high volume of requests has led to what a Colorado official said amounts to "a denial-of-service attack on local government." Local election officials in Florida and Michigan have reported spending 25–70% of staff time in recent years on processing public records requests. In 2022, officials in Maricopa County, Arizona reported one request that required nearly half the election office's staff to spend four days sorting and scanning 20,000 documents.

A review of recent state laws by the Center for Election Innovation & Research found at least 13 states that have sought to protect election staff from the abuse of FOIA requests in several ways, such as creating publicly accessible databases that do not require staff assistance and giving election staff the authority to deny unreasonable or clearly frivolous requests.

On May 12, 2025, the U.S. Department of Justice demanded "all records" related to the 2024 federal elections in Colorado, a request that National Public Radio called "unprecedented" in its scope. David Becker, executive director of the Center for Election Innovation & Research, said fulfilling such a request "would fill Mile High Stadium," adding that "it's very unlikely the DOJ would even know what to do with all of that," characterizing the request as "more like a fishing expedition than...some kind of targeted investigation."

== See also ==
- Freedom of information laws by country
- Sunshine Week
- Open government
- Declassification

=== Individuals ===
- Jason Leopold
- Ryan Shapiro

=== U.S. ===
- Moynihan Commission on Government Secrecy
- McBurney v. Young
- MuckRock
- National Archives and Records Administration
- NSA warrantless surveillance controversy
- Patriot Act
- The Black Vault
- U.S. reclassification program
- United States v. Reynolds
- State ex. rel. Quolke v. Strongsville City School District
