= Leandro Aragoncillo =

Filipino-born American military person

- Born: September 22, 1958 (age 67); Manila, Philippines
- Occupation: FBI intelligence analyst United States Marine Corps

Leandro Aparente Aragoncillo (born September 22, 1958) is a Filipino-born American former FBI intelligence analyst and a retired United States Marine Corps Gunnery Sergeant who was convicted of spying against the United States Government in 2007. A naturalized Filipino-American, he was charged with espionage and with leaking classified information to the regime of a former Filipino president.

The FBI labeled Aragoncillo the first known case of espionage within the history of the White House. For over thirty-one months, from 1999 to 2001, Aragoncillo was assigned under Vice President Al Gore and then later under Vice President Dick Cheney.

Aragoncillo retired from the Marine Corps in 2004 after 21 years of service. Hired to work for the FBI at the Army's Ft. Monmouth base in New Jersey in July 2004, Aragoncillo began sending classified documents in January 2005, according to a federal complaint.

On October 5, 2005, Aragoncillo was indicted and arrested in New Jersey for espionage. Federal agents accused him of stealing classified information, including details about President Gloria Macapagal Arroyo and then passing that information onto opposition leaders in the Philippines.

According to reports compiled by Filipino intelligence professionals, there were indications of a link between Aragoncillo and the French intelligence service, Direction générale de la sécurité extérieure. Frequent visits by Aragoncillo to Manila allegedly were interspersed with clandestine meetings between identified, French operatives and several "illegals" (i.e. unregistered agents) around 2002 to 2004.

Statutes used against Aragoncillo:

- Count 1: 18 U.S.C. § 794(a) & c - Espionage Act of 1917
- Count 2: 18 U.S.C. § 793(e) - Espionage Act of 1917 / McCarran Internal Security Act 1950
- Count 3: 18 U.S.C. § 1030(a)(1) & 2 - Comprehensive Crime Control Act 1984 / Computer Fraud and Abuse Act 1986 / The National Information Infrastructure Protection Act 1996 / USA Patriot Act 2001 / etc.

Michael Ray Aquino, a former deputy director of the Philippines National Police who lived in New York City, was arrested also and was charged. He was accused of receiving documents. He pleaded guilty to unlawful possession of secret, U.S. government documents. He faced a jail sentence of between 70 and 87 months plus a fine of $250,000. On July 17, 2007, he was sentenced to six years and four months.

Leandro Aragoncillo, on the other hand, was sentenced on July 18, 2007, in New Jersey by U.S. District Judge William H. Walls to ten years in prison. Under a proposed plea agreement, Aragoncillo had faced up to twenty years in prison.

== See also ==
- Executive Order 13292
- Executive Order 12958
- Espionage Act of 1917
