= Depository Library Act of 1962 =

American federal statute

- Long title: An Act to revise the laws relating to depository libraries.
- Acronyms (colloquial): DLA
- Enacted by: the 87th United States Congress
- Effective: August 9, 1962

Citations
- Public law: 87-579
- Statutes at Large: 76 Stat. 352

Codification
- Titles amended: 44 U.S.C.: Public Printing and Documents
- U.S.C. sections created: 44 U.S.C. ch. 19 § 1901 et seq.

Legislative history
- Introduced in the House as H.R. 8141 by Wayne Hays (D–OH) on July 17, 1962; Committee consideration by House Administration, Senate Rules and Administration; Passed the House on August 22, 1961 (passed); Passed the Senate on June 15, 1962 (passed) with amendment; House agreed to Senate amendment on July 18, 1962 (agreed) with further amendment; Senate agreed to House amendment on July 25, 1962 (agreed); Signed into law by President John F. Kennedy on August 9, 1962

Depository Library Act of 1962 is a federal statute revising the depository library laws passed in the United States from 1895 to 1939. The Act of Congress mandated the availability of U.S. government publications through the Superintendent of Documents for public information. The statute established requirements for two depository libraries as allocated by U.S. Congressional representatives per their respective congressional districts. The U.S. federal law provided provisions appointing land-grant colleges and the United States service academies as depository libraries for U.S. government publications. The 87th U.S. Congressional legislation authorized regional depository libraries allocating two depository libraries per U.S. state as defined by a United States Senator. The Act repealed Public Law 76-281 designating the United States Coast Guard Academy library as a depository of U.S. government publications while redelegating the New London, Connecticut office of the Superintendent of Documents.

== Revised Depository Library Laws ==
Chronological timeline of depository library laws revised by the Depository Library Act of 1962.

Date of Enactment	Public Law Number	U.S. Statute Citation	U.S. Presidential Administration
January 12, 1895	P.L. 53-23	28 Stat. 601	Grover Cleveland
March 1, 1907	P.L. 59-153	34 Stat. 1012	Theodore Roosevelt
June 20, 1936	P.L. 74-724	49 Stat. 1545	Franklin D. Roosevelt
June 25, 1938	P.L. 75-750	52 Stat. 1206	Franklin D. Roosevelt
August 5, 1939	P.L. 76-281	53 Stat. 1209	Franklin D. Roosevelt

== See also ==
- Federal Depository Library Program
- Freedom of Information Act
- Freedom of information in the United States
