= Executive Order 13233 =

2001 United States executive order

- Further Implementation of the Presidential Records Act

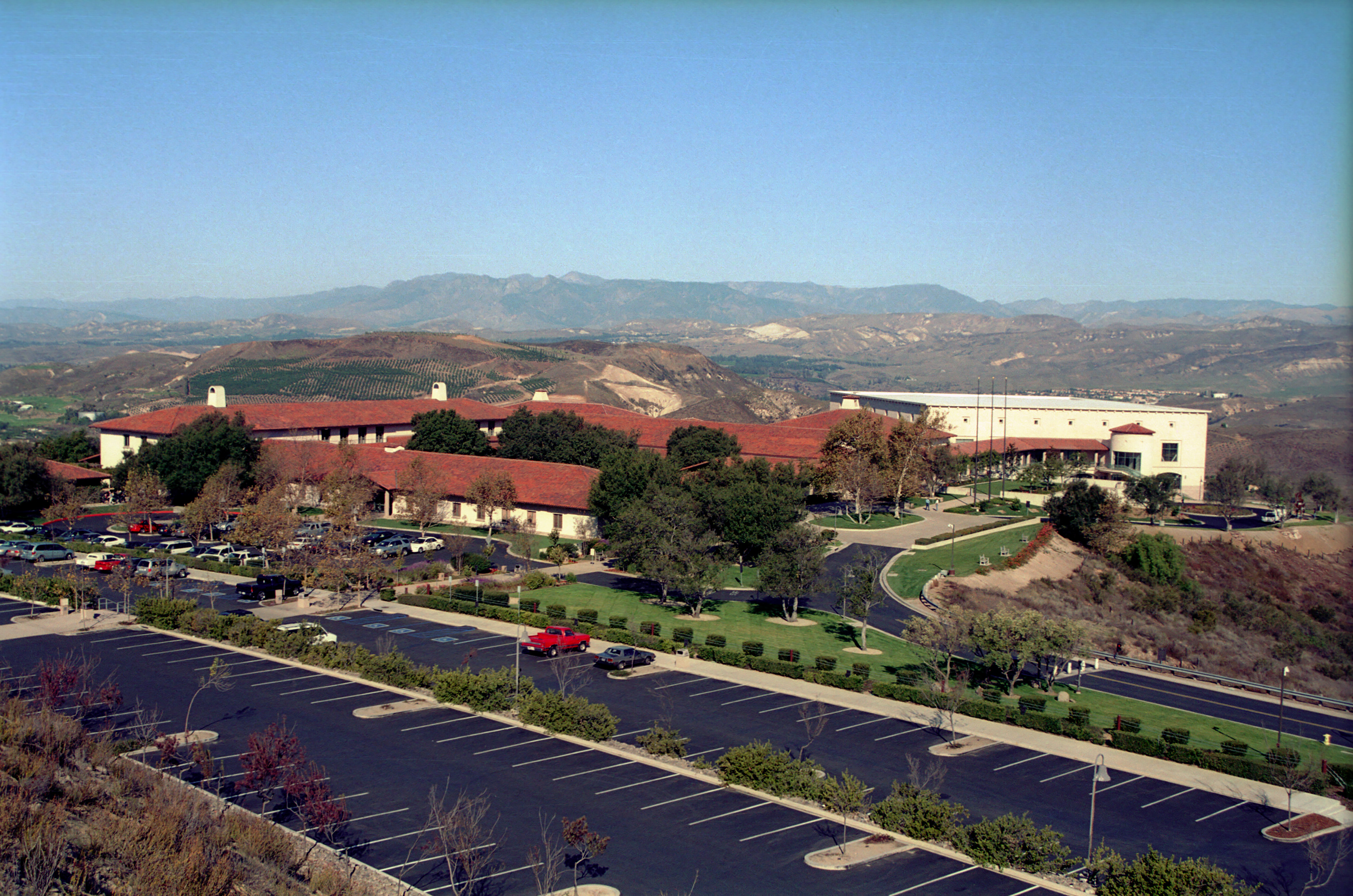
- The Executive Order limited access to records of former U.S. Presidents (Ronald Reagan Presidential Library pictured)
- Type: Executive order
- Number: 13233
- President: George W. Bush
- Signed: November 1, 2001

Federal Register details
- Federal Register document number: 01-27917
- Publication date: November 5, 2001
- Document citation: 66 FR 56025

Summary
- Limited access to the records of former Presidents of the United States.

Repealed by
- Executive Order 13489, "Presidential Records", January 21, 2009

Executive Order 13233 limited access to the records of former United States Presidents to a higher degree than the previous Order 12667, which it superseded. It was drafted by then White House Counsel Alberto Gonzales and issued by George W. Bush on November 1, 2001. Section 13 of Order 13233 revoked Executive Order 12667, which was issued by Ronald Reagan on January 18, 1989.

Executive Order 13233 was partially struck down in October 2007. The order was revoked on January 21, 2009, by Barack Obama's Executive Order 13489, which essentially restored most of the wording of Order 12667 with some modifications.

== Background ==
In 1974, Congress passed the Presidential Recordings and Materials Preservation Act of 1974, placing the presidential records of Richard Nixon in federal custody to prevent their destruction. The legislative action was intended to reduce secrecy, while allowing historians to perform their responsibilities. In 1972, decades worth of official and unofficial Federal Bureau of Investigation records had been destroyed, upon the death of J. Edgar Hoover, by his longtime secretary, Helen Gandy. The Presidential Records Act of 1978 expanded such protection of historical records, by mandating that the records of former presidents would automatically become the property of the federal government upon their departures from the Oval Office, and then transferred to the Archivist of the United States, thereafter to be made available to the public after no more than 12 years.

Thus, the presidential papers of Ronald Reagan were due to be made public when George W. Bush took office in January 2001. However, in a White House memo dated March 23, 2001, the Counsel to the President conveyed the following to U.S Archivist John W. Carlin:

Section 2(b) of Executive Order 12667, issued by former President Ronald Reagan on January 16, 1989, requires the Archivist of the United States to delay release of Presidential records at the instruction of the current President. On behalf of the President, I instruct you to extend for 90 days (until June 21, 2001) the time in which President Bush may claim a constitutionally based privilege over the Presidential records that former President Reagan, acting under Section 2204(a) of Title 4, has protected from disclosure for the 12 years since the end of his presidency. This directive applies as well to the Vice Presidential records of former Vice President George H. W. Bush.

This instruction was repeated on June 6, 2001, before the 90 days had elapsed, giving a new deadline of August 31, 2001. On the day of this deadline, Alberto Gonzales instructed the Archivist to wait a few additional weeks. On November 1, 2001, Bush issued Executive Order 13233, limiting the access to the records of former U.S. Presidents:

...reflecting military, diplomatic, or national security secrets, Presidential communications, legal advice, legal work, or the deliberative processes of the President and the President's advisers, and to do so in a manner consistent with the Supreme Court's decisions in Nixon v. Administrator of General Services, 433 U.S. 425 (1977), and other cases...

== Criticism ==
The Society of American Archivists and the American Library Association were critical of the president's exercise of executive power by issuing EO 13233. They claimed that the action "violates both the spirit and letter of existing U.S. law on access to presidential papers as clearly laid down in 44 U.S.C. §§ 2201–2207," noting that the order "potentially threatens to undermine one of the very foundations of our nation."

John Wertman, a member of former President Bill Clinton's White House staff, wrote an op-ed piece critical of the executive order that appeared in The Washington Post on February 26, 2006. Wertman asserted that Order 13233 "represents a wholesale change in the way the federal government preserves and promotes our national public memory." He also included a quote from former President Gerald Ford on the topic: "I firmly believe that after X period of time, presidential papers, except for the most highly sensitive documents involving our national security, should be made available to the public, and the sooner the better."

== Response ==
Before January 21, 2009, there were three separate attempts to repeal Order 13233. In 2002, shortly after Order 13233 went into effect, a bipartisan group of U.S. House of Representatives members, led by Stephen Horn (R-CA), Dan Burton (R-IN), Jan Schakowsky (D-IL), and Henry Waxman (D-CA) wrote and debated a bill aimed at repealing Order 13233, thereby restoring Order 12667 to full force and effect. The bill passed the House Committee on Oversight and Government Reform, which was chaired by Burton at the time, but never saw floor action.

On March 1, 2007, a subcommittee of the Committee on Government Reform held a hearing on bill H.R. 1255, the Presidential Records Act Amendments of 2007. This bill was also introduced by Waxman, and its goal was again to void Order 13233. At the hearing, several historians argued that Order 13233 has severely curtailed public access to presidential records and added to delays in obtaining materials from presidential libraries. The bill was reported favorably by the full committee, and on March 14, 2007, the House passed the bill in an overwhelmingly bipartisan vote of 333–93. The bill also passed on June 13, 2007, in a Senate committee, but was never brought to the floor for a vote, reportedly due to a hold placed on the measure by Senator Jim Bunning (R-KY). As a result, the bill died when the 110th Congress ended.

On January 7, 2009, the House of the 111th Congress passed H.R. 35, introduced by Edolphus Towns (D-NY), section 3 of which would, if enacted, negate Order 13233. The bill was co-sponsored by Dan Burton (R-IN), Darrell Issa (R-CA), Henry Waxman (D-CA), William Clay (D-MO), and Brad Sherman (D-CA). The bill died in the Senate Committee on Homeland Security and Governmental Affairs.

== Lawsuit ==
In November 2001, the National Security Archive, the American Historical Association and other plaintiffs filed a lawsuit in the D.C. District Court against the National Archives and Records Administration and the Archivist, claiming constitutional problems with the order, and pointing out that "access to materials may be delayed for an unlimited period of time after the expiration of the 12-year restriction period while a former president and the incumbent president ‘review’ materials proposed for release", because of § 3(b) of the order, which states

After receiving the records he requests, the former President shall review those records as expeditiously as possible, and for no longer than 90 days for requests that are not unduly burdensome. The Archivist shall not permit access to the records by a requester during this period of review or when requested by the former President to extend the time for review.

While most of the lawsuit was found to be nonjusticiable at this time due to lack of ripeness, in October 2007 the Court held that "the Archivist’s reliance on § 3(b) of Executive Order 13,233 is arbitrary, capricious, an abuse of discretion, and not in accordance with law in violation of the Administrative Procedure Act" and enjoined "the Archivist from further relying on § 3(b) of Executive Order 13,233". The rest of the lawsuit was dismissed without prejudice.

== Revocation ==
On January 21, 2009, Executive Order 13233 was revoked by executive order of President Barack Obama. Obama essentially restored the wording of Executive Order 12667, by repeating most of the text of that order with minor changes. One notable change is that vice presidential records are explicitly covered by his new order.

== See also ==
- Freedom of Information Act (United States)
- U.S. reclassification program
- Presidential Records Act
- Communications Over Various Feeds Electronically for Engagement Act
