= Withdrawal of previously declassified U.S. federal records =

The withdrawal of previously declassified U.S. federal records is a process in which agencies can remove records from public access that they believe were incorrectly declassified and made available to the public at the National Archives and Records Administration. The process is often referred to as "reclassification, " but because the records were never properly declassified and remained classified even when made publicly available, they are not re-classified.

== History ==
In 1995, Bill Clinton signed Executive Order 12958 directing agencies to declassify all records that were 25 years or older by the end of 1999, with certain exemptions for information that remained sensitive. Security concerns over restricted data were heightened in 1999 by the Wen Ho Lee case, in which a Taiwanese American nuclear weapons engineer was accused of selling secrets to the People's Republic of China. Additionally, the State Department was accused by the Energy Department of improperly releasing information it was not authorized to declassify. In 1999, declassification efforts slowed considerably with the passage of the Kyl-Lott Amendment to the 1999 Defense Authorization Act which requires that all declassified records be reviewed for restricted data and formerly restricted data. The Kyl-Lott Amendment led to the removal of previously declassified records from public access for re-review of restricted data.

During the George W. Bush administration, the signing of Executive Order 13292 in 2003 eased the process of withdrawals and further delayed automatic declassification review. The process was further codified in 2009 by the signing of Executive Order 13526 and 32 C.F.R. § 2001.13.

The process of removing previously declassified records was itself covert until it was revealed by the National Security Archive in February 2006. Following outcry by journalists, historians, and the public, an internal audit by the National Archive's Information Security Oversight Office indicated that more than one-third of the records withdrawn since 1999 did not contain sensitive information. In response, the National Archives has made annual reports of records withdrawn from public access.

== Withdrawals of previously-declassified records since 2006 ==
Fiscal Year	Agency	NARA facility	Date withdrawn	Number of records withdrawn	Number of textual pages withdrawn
2006	NSC/NSA/State	LBJ Library and Museum	May 2006	1	2
2006	CIA	LBJ Library and Museum	May 2006	1	2
2006	CIA	Jimmy Carter Library and Museum	Sep 2006	2	2
2007	Air Force	College Park	Dec 2006	1	1
2007	Air Force	College Park	Jan 2007	1	1
2007	DOE	College Park	Feb 2007	1	7
2008	None withdrawn				
2009	Navy	Nixon Presidential Library at College Park	Feb 17 2009	1	136
2009	Navy	College Park	Jan 15 2009	1	22
2009	Navy	College Park	Jan 15 2009	1	14
2010	None withdrawn				
2011	None withdrawn				
2012	None withdrawn				
2013	None withdrawn				
2014	CIA	College Park	Feb 25 2014	20 (one in full; 19 redacted)	81 (65 unique; 16 duplicate)
2015	DOE (Note: Withdrawn per Kyl and Lott Amendments to the 1999 and 2000 Defense Authorization Acts and the Atomic Energy Act, as amended.)	College Park	Jun 30 2015	2	27
2015	DOE	College Park	Jun 30 2015	1	21
2015	DOE	College Park	Jun 30 2015	3	136
2015	DOE	College Park	Jun 30 2015	1	226
2016	DOE	College Park	Oct 1 2015	18	968
2017	None withdrawn				
2018	None withdrawn				
2019	None withdrawn				
2020	None withdrawn				
2021	None withdrawn				
2022	None withdrawn				
2023	None withdrawn				
2024	None withdrawn				
2025	None withdrawn				

== See also ==
- National Security Archive
- Executive Order 13233
- Freedom of Information Act (United States)
- National Declassification Center
