= Tennessee Open Records Act =

State law providing access to public records in Tennessee, USA

The Tennessee Open Records Act (TORA) is a freedom of information law enacted in Tennessee in 1957. The law that states that any citizen of Tennessee may request public records there.

== Provisions and applicability ==
The law states that documents shall "be open for personal inspection by any citizen of Tennessee." Despite the law's provisions, federal court rulings have overturned similar state specific statutes and open up records in these states to all U.S. citizens.

In a U.S. Supreme Court ruling McBurney v. Young (2013), concerning Virginia specifically but also relevant to Tennessee, upheld that states can restrict open records to their citizens. However, open records counsel Ann V. Butterworth also stated that the law "does not forbid providing access to others".

== See also ==
- Freedom of Information Act, a federal freedom of information law
