= Benjamin Perley Poore =

American journalist, editor, and author

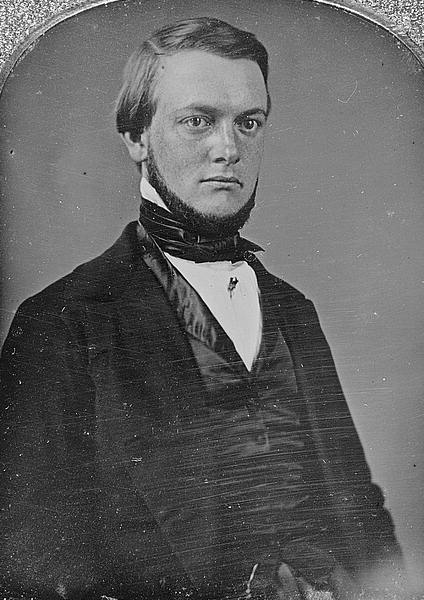
- Born: November 2, 1820; Newburyport, Massachusetts, US
- Died: May 30, 1887 (aged 66); Washington, D.C., US
- Political party: Republican; Whig

Benjamin Perley Poore (November 2, 1820 – May 30, 1887) was an American journalist, editor, and author in the mid-19th century. One of the most popular and prolific journalists of his era, he was an active partisan for the Whig and Republican parties.

== Biography ==
Poore was born at the home of his maternal grandparents in Newburyport, Massachusetts, to parents Benjamin and Mary Perley (Dodge) Poore whose family estate, Indian Hill Farm, was in nearby West Newbury, Massachusetts. His father's family were long-time residents of the area; his mother had been born in 1799 in Georgetown, a small incorporated community in the newly defined District of Columbia.

When Poore was seven, his parents took him to Washington, D.C., for the first time, during the administration of President John Quincy Adams. About this time, he enrolled in Governor Dummer Academy in Byfield, Massachusetts, to prepare for a West Point appointment. When he was eleven years old he was taken by his father to England, where saw Walter Scott, Lafayette, and other notables. Poore was expelled from Dummer Academy for misbehavior and apprenticed himself to a printer in Worcester, Massachusetts.

Poore's father purchased a newspaper in Athens, Georgia, the Southern Whig, which Poore edited for two years. In 1841, he visited Europe again as attaché of the American legation at Brussels, remaining abroad until 1848. During this period he was the foreign correspondent of the Boston Atlas. After editing the Boston Bee and Sunday Sentinel, Poore returned to the national capital in 1854 as a Washington correspondent. His colorful letters to The Boston Journal and other newspapers over the signature of "Perley" made his national reputation.

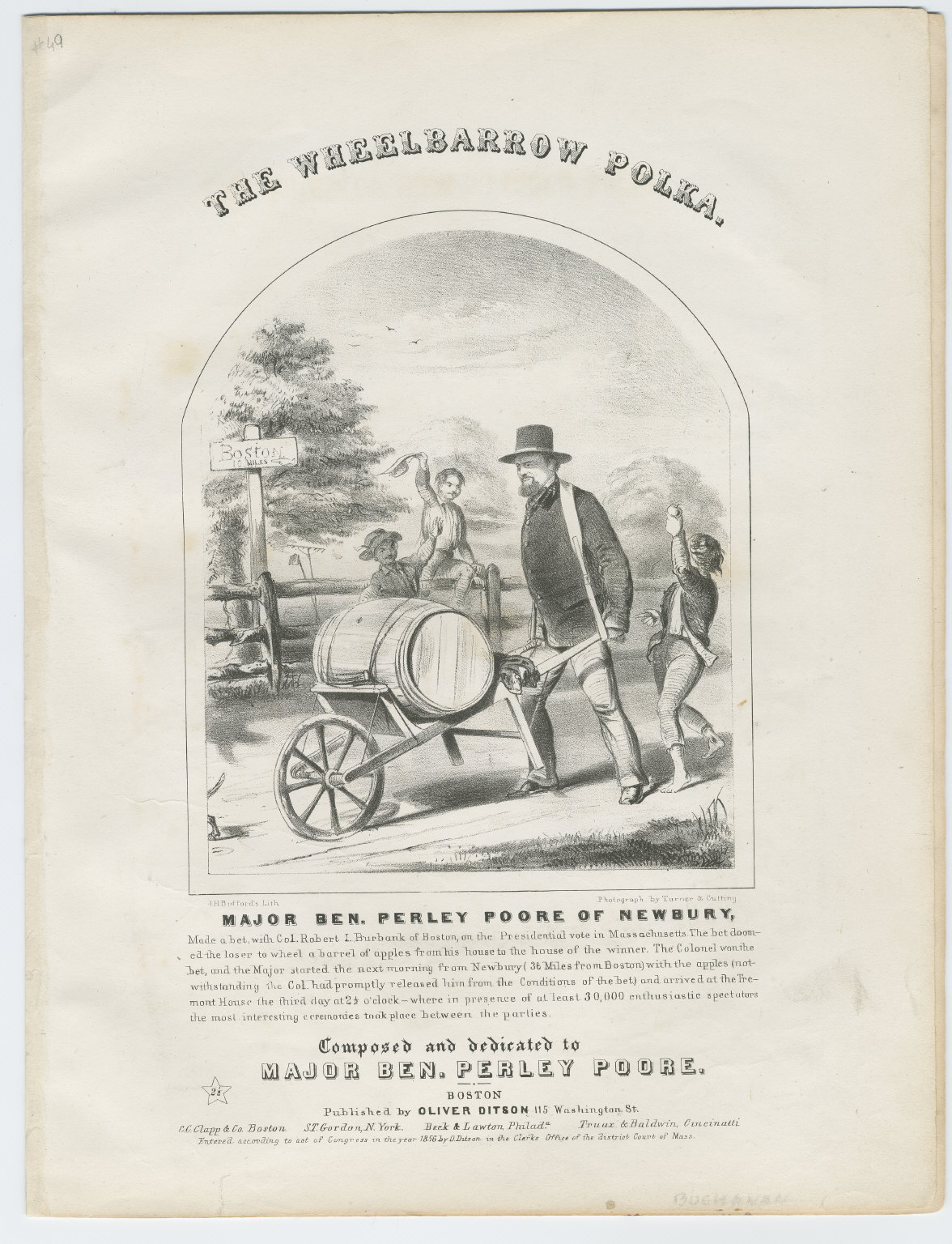
"Wheelbarrow Polka", composed in honor of Poore's post-election, 36-mile walk with barrel of apples, to Tremont House in Boston, 1856 (Cornell University)

He ran for a seat in the U.S. Congress from Massachusetts Sixth District in 1856 and lost. He supported Millard Fillmore in the presidential election that year and lost a wager that Fillmore would win more votes in Massachusetts than his opponent John C. Frémont. To fulfil the terms of that bet, he transported a barrel of apples by wheelbarrow from his hometown of West Newbury to Boston. He completed the 36-mile course over two days and was met by a cheering crowd of 10,000 that included a military escort on horseback and the members of local Fillmore clubs.

During the Civil War, he organized a battalion of riflemen at Newbury that formed the nucleus of a company in the 8th Massachusetts volunteers, in which Poore served as major for a short time, retaining the title of Major Poore for the rest of his life. In March 1862, Poore and the novelist Nathaniel Hawthorne were among a small delegation that visited President Abraham Lincoln at the White House.

In addition to his newspaper writing, Poore served as clerk of the committee of the United States Senate on printing records, where he edited the Congressional Directory beginning in 1867 and the Biographical Directory of the United States Congress.

Poore was elected a member of the American Antiquarian Society in 1874.

In 1885, Poore organized the Gridiron Club and served as its first president. Designed as social events to bring reporters and politicians together to repair the ill-will sometimes generated by news stories, Gridiron dinners featured satirical songs and skits performed by Washington's leading journalists. The club's annual white-tie dinners continue to attract presidents and other dignitaries.

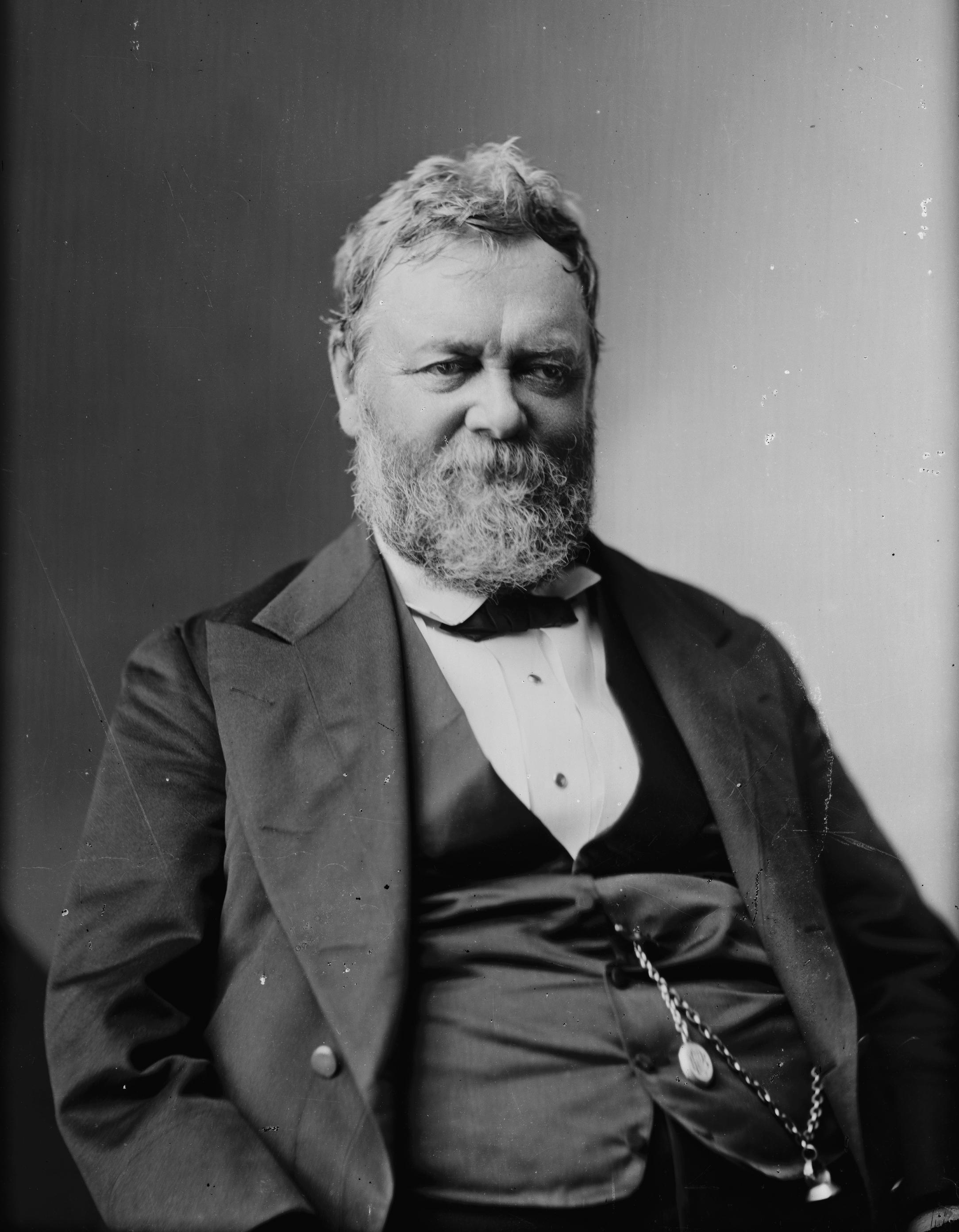
Benjamin Perley Poore, between 1870 and 1887.

When he died in Washington, D.C., on May 30, 1887, The New York Times wrote:

He had a wide acquaintance, having known everybody of consequence in the capital for 30 years or more, was a living storehouse of anecdotes, a popular diner-out, and enjoyed the confidence of many leading public men.

== Writings ==
- Campaign Life of General Zachary Taylor (1848)
- The Rise and Fall of Louis Philippe, Ex-king of the French (Boston, 1848)
- Early Life of Napoleon Bonaparte (1851)
- Agricultural History of Essex County, Massachusetts
- The Conspiracy Trial for the Murder of Abraham Lincoln (1865)
- Federal and State Charters 2 vols., (1877)
- The Life and Public Services of Ambrose E. Burnside (1882)
- A Descriptive Catalogue of the Government Publications of the United States, 1774-1881 (1885)
- Perley's Reminiscences of Sixty Years in the National Metropolis Vol. I (Philadelphia, 1886).
- Perley's Reminiscences of Sixty Years in the National Metropolis Vol. II (Philadelphia, 1886).
