= Presidential and Federal Records Act Amendments of 2014 =

Federal law

- Long title: To amend chapter 22 of title 44, United States Code, popularly known as the Presidential Records Act, to establish procedures for the consideration of claims of constitutionally based privilege against disclosure of presidential records, and for other purposes.
- Enacted by: the 113th United States Congress
- Announced in: the 113th United States Congress
- Sponsored by: Rep. Elijah E. Cummings (D, MD-7)
- Number of co-sponsors: 0

Citations
- Public law: 113-187

Codification
- Acts affected: Federal Records Act, Presidential Records Act
- U.S.C. sections affected: 44 U.S.C. § 2208, 44 U.S.C. § 2203, 44 U.S.C. § 2204, 44 U.S.C. § 2904, 44 U.S.C. § 2906, and others.
- Agencies affected: General Services Administration, United States Congress, Architect of the Capitol, National Archives and Records Administration, President of the United States, Supreme Court of the United States, Executive Office of the President, United States Department of Justice

Legislative history
- Introduced in the House as H.R. 1233 by Elijah Cummings (D–MD) on March 18, 2013; Committee consideration by United States House Committee on Oversight and Government Reform, United States Senate Committee on Homeland Security and Governmental Affairs; Passed the House on January 14, 2014 (420-0); Passed the Senate on September 10, 2014 (unanimous consent) with amendment; House agreed to Senate amendment on November 12, 2014 (voice vote); Signed into law by President Barack Obama on November 26, 2014

The Presidential and Federal Records Act Amendments of 2014 (Pub. L. 113–187 (text) (PDF)) is a United States federal statute which amended the Presidential Records Act and Federal Records Act. Introduced as H.R. 1233, it was signed into law by President Barack Obama on November 26, 2014.

The act amends federal law regarding the preservation, storage, and management of federal records, specifically requiring, prior to the release of records, the archivist of the United States to give appropriate notice to both the incumbent president of the United States and the president who was in office at the time the record was created. The last provision forbids officers and employees of the executive branch from using personal email accounts for government business, unless the employee copies all emails to either the originating officer's or employee's government email, or to an official government record system to be recorded and archived.

The bill was introduced into the United States House of Representatives during the 113th United States Congress by the late Representative Elijah Cummings.

== Provisions of the act ==
This summary is based largely on the summary provided by the Congressional Research Service, a public domain source.

The Presidential and Federal Records Act Amendments of 2014, in section 2, amended the Presidential Records Act to require the archivist of the United States, upon determining to make publicly available any presidential record not previously made available, to: (1) promptly provide written notice of such determination to the incumbent president and the former president during whose term of office the record was created; and (2) make such record available to the public within 60 days, except any record with respect to which the archivist receives notification from a former or incumbent president of a claim of constitutionally-based privilege against disclosure. The archivist is prohibited from making a record that is subject to such a claim publicly available unless: (1) the incumbent president withdraws a decision upholding the claim, or (2) the archivist is otherwise directed to do so by a final court order that is not subject to appeal.

The bill prohibits the archivist from making available any original presidential records to anyone claiming access to them as a designated representative of a president or former president if that individual has been convicted of a crime relating to the review, retention, removal, or destruction of the records of the Archives.

The bill prohibits the president, the vice president, or a covered employee (i.e., the immediate staff of the president and vice president or office advising and assisting the president or vice president) from creating or sending a presidential or vice presidential record using a non-official electronic messaging account unless the president, vice president, or covered employee: (1) copies an official electronic messaging account of the president, vice president, or covered employee in the original creation or transmission of the presidential or vice presidential record; or (2) forwards a complete copy of the presidential record to an official electronic messaging account of the president, vice president, or covered employee not later than 20 days after the original creation or transmission of the presidential or vice presidential record.

Section three of the bill provides that the transfer to the archivist of records by a federal agency that have historical significance shall take place as soon as practicable but not later than 30 years after the creation or receipt of such records by an agency. Expands the authority of the archivist with respect to the creation and preservation of audio and visual records.

Section five of the bill revised the definition of "records" for purposes of this Act to include all recorded information, regardless of form or characteristics. Makes the archivist's determination of whether recorded information is a record binding on all federal agencies.

Section six of the bill directs the archivist to prescribe internal procedures to prevent the unauthorized removal of classified records from the National Archives and Records Administration (NARA) or the destruction or damage of such records, including when such records are accessed electronically. Requires such procedures to: (1) prohibit any person, other than personnel with appropriate security clearances (covered personnel), from viewing classified records in any room that is not secure, except in the presence of NARA personnel or under video surveillance, from being left alone with classified records unless under video surveillance, or from conducting any review of classified records while in the possession of any personal communication device; (2) require all persons seeking access to classified records to consent to a search of their belongings upon conclusion of their records review; and (3) require all writings prepared by persons, other than covered personnel, during the course of a review of classified records to be retained by NARA in a secure facility until such writings are determined to be unclassified, are declassified, or are securely transferred to another secure facility.

Section seven of the bill repeals provisions authorizing the National Study Commission on Records and Documents of Federal Officials.

Section nine of the bill transferred responsibility for records management from the administrator of the General Services Administration (GSA) to the archivist. Requires the transfer of records from federal agencies to the National Archives in digital or electronic form to the greatest extent possible.

Section ten of the bill prohibits an officer or employee of an executive agency from creating or sending a record using a non-official electronic messaging account unless such officer or employee: (1) copies an official electronic messaging account of the officer or employee in the original creation or transmission of the record, or (2) forwards a complete copy of the record to an official electronic messaging account of the officer or employee not later than 20 days after the original creation or transmission of the record. Provides for disciplinary action against an agency officer or employee for an intentional violation of such prohibition.

== Legislative history ==
The Presidential and Federal Records Act Amendments of 2014 was introduced into the United States House of Representatives on March 18, 2013 by Rep. Elijah E. Cummings (D, MD-7). It was referred to the United States House Committee on Oversight and Government Reform. It was reported (amended) on June 25, 2013 alongside House Report 113-127. On January 14, 2014, the House voted in Roll Call Vote 18 to pass the bill 420-0. The United States Senate received the bill on January 15, 2014 and referred it to the United States Senate Committee on Homeland Security and Governmental Affairs. On September 10, 2014, the Senate voted with unanimous consent to pass an amended version of the bill, sending it back to the House for reconsideration.

Rep. Cummings, who introduced the bill, said "I applaud the Senate for passing this good government bill that will give the American people timely access to the records presidents create while they are in office."

== See also ==
- List of bills in the 113th United States Congress
- Classified information in the United States
