= United States Records Act =

Act of the 1st United States Congress, 1st session

Records Act of 1789
- Long title: An Act to provide for the safe-keeping of the Acts, Records and Seal of the United States, and for other purposes.
- Enacted by: the 1st United States Congress
- Effective: September 15, 1789

Citations
- Public law: Pub. L. 1–14
- Statutes at Large: 1 Stat. 68 (1789)

Legislative history
- Introduced in the House as H.R. 14 by Theodore Sedgwick (F-MA) on July 31, 1789; Passed the House on August 27, 1789 (Passed); Passed the Senate on September 7, 1789 (Passed) with amendment; House agreed to Senate amendment on September 8, 1789 (Agreed); Signed into law by President George Washington on September 15, 1789

The Records Act, also known as an Act to provide for the safe-keeping of the Acts, Records and Seal of the United States, and for other purposes, was the fourteenth law passed by the United States Congress.

The first section of the bill renamed the Department of Foreign Affairs to the Department of State The next section charged the Secretary of State with receiving legislation from the president for safekeeping. Five subsequent provisions governed the creation, custody and use of the Seal of the United States.

The act also directed the Secretary of State to ensure that every bill enacted or vetoed was published in at least three newspapers, making it the nation's first freedom of information law, though its provisions would later be used to justify the withholding of information from the public.

In 1875 by accordance of the Revised Statutes of the United States, the law was codified into 5 U.S.C. section 301, the Housekeeping Statute.

Housekeeping Statute

The head of an Executive department or military department may prescribe regulations for the government of his department, the conduct of its employees, the distribution and performance of its business, and the custody, use, and preservation of its records, papers, and property. This section does not authorize withholding information from the public or limiting the availability of records to the public.

— 5 U.S.C. ch. 3 § 301

== See also ==
- Federal Records Act of 1950
- Presidential Records Act of 1978
