= Covfefe (disambiguation) =

Covfefe is a word used on Twitter by Donald Trump.

Covfefe may also refer to:

- COVFEFE Act, a bill introduced by the United States House of Representatives
- Covfefe (horse), a retired American racehorse
