= Executive Order 12667 =

United States executive order

Executive Order 12667 established a procedure for former United States Presidents to limit access to certain records which would otherwise have been released by the National Archives and Records Administration under the Presidential Records Act of 1978. It was issued by President Ronald Reagan on 18 January 1989.

The Executive Order was revoked by President George W. Bush's Executive Order 13233 on 1 November 2001, which further limited access to the records of former United States Presidents. This order was in turn revoked by President Barack Obama's Executive Order 13489 on January 21, 2009 (his first day in office), which essentially restored the provisions of Executive Order 12667 with some modifications.

== Procedure ==
Before releasing any records of a former President, the Archivist of the United States must notify both the incumbent President and the former President of any records which the Archivist believes may be subject to a claim of Executive privilege. Each President then has 30 days to submit the claim in writing to the Archivist.

Incumbent President
The incumbent President consults with the Attorney General and the Counsel to the President. If the President chooses to submit a claim of Executive privilege, the Archivist will not release the privileged records unless directed to do so by an incumbent President or by a final court order.
Former President
If the former President submits a claim of Executive privilege, the Archivist consults with the Attorney General, the Counsel to the President and any other relevant Federal agencies. Ultimately, the Archivist decides whether or not to honor the former President's request to privilege the records. Since only those records approved for release by the incumbent President are examined by the Archivist under this section of the Executive Order, the Archivist does not take this into account when determining whether or not to grant the claim of Executive privilege by a former President. If the Archivist decides to release the records notwithstanding a claim by a former President, he must notify both the incumbent and former Presidents no fewer than 30 days before the records are released.

If after 30 days the Archivist has received no claims, he releases the records pursuant to the PRA.
