= Nixon v. Administrator of General Services =

- Supreme Court of the United States

Argued April 20, 1977 Decided June 28, 1977
- Full case name: Nixon v. Administrator of General Services
- Citations: 433 U.S. 425 (more) 97 S. Ct. 2777; 53 L. Ed. 2d 867; 1977 U.S. LEXIS 24

Case history
- Prior: 408 F. Supp. 321 (D.D.C. 1976); probable jurisdiction noted, 429 U.S. 976 (1976).

Holding
- Congress has the power to pass an act directing the seizure and disposition, within the control of the Executive Branch, of the papers and tapes of a former president.

Court membership
- Chief Justice Warren E. Burger Associate Justices William J. Brennan Jr. · Potter Stewart; Byron White · Thurgood Marshall; Harry Blackmun · Lewis F. Powell Jr. William Rehnquist · John P. Stevens

Case opinions
- Majority: Brennan, joined by Stewart, Marshall, Stevens (in full); White (except for Part VII); Blackmun (Part VII only); Powell (except for Parts IV and V)
- Concurrence: Stevens
- Concurrence: White (in part)
- Concurrence: Blackmun (in part)
- Concurrence: Powell (in part)
- Dissent: Burger
- Dissent: Rehnquist

Nixon v. Administrator of General Services, 433 U.S. 425 (1977), is a landmark court case concerning the principle of presidential privilege and whether the public is allowed to view a President's “confidential documents”. The Presidential Recordings and Materials Preservation Act, signed into law by President Gerald Ford in 1974, ordered that the Administrator of the General Services Administration obtain President Richard Nixon’s presidential papers and tape recordings. In addition, the Act further ordered that government archivists seize these materials. These archivists would preserve the material deemed historic and return to former President Nixon the materials deemed private. Furthermore, this Act stated that material that was preserved could be used in judicial hearings and proceedings. Immediately after this Act was enacted, Richard Nixon filed a lawsuit in a federal district court claiming that the Act violated the principle of separation of powers, the principle of presidential privilege, Nixon's personal privacy, his First Amendment right of association, and further asserted that it amounted to a constitutionally prohibited Bill of Attainder.

== Background ==
Historically, all presidential papers were considered the personal property of the president. Some took them at the end of their terms while others destroyed them. Franklin D. Roosevelt was the first to make them available to the public when he donated them to the National Archives in 1939, as the Franklin D. Roosevelt Presidential Library and Museum, but did so voluntarily.

This case was argued a few years after the Watergate scandal had broken out and the President was compelled to resign in the face of the impeachment process against Richard Nixon. The former President objected to the seizure of documents from the Nixon Administration, as he did not want to further tarnish the public's already negative perception of him as a corrupt and scheming politician. Given that he was not liable to criminal prosecution, as he had been pardoned, Nixon's concern for his reputation appears to be the primary reason that he did not want his private documents to be inspected by historical archivists and made available to the public. The forty two million pages of documents and eight hundred and eighty tape recordings produced during his presidency would reveal critical information about Nixon's involvement in the Watergate scandal, his real opinions on a wide range of issues, and further perpetuate his image as a paranoid and secretive President. These are some of the underlying personal motives as to why Richard Nixon chose to file a lawsuit against the Administrator of General Services the day after President Ford signed the Presidential Recordings and Materials Preservation Act into law.

President Nixon also felt that this Act broke the confidentiality promise that the Administrator of General Services gave to Nixon after he resigned from the presidency. This confidentiality agreement stated that both Richard Nixon and the General Service Administration could not access the former President's tapes and documents located near his California home without each party's respective consent. The agreement specifically provided that Richard Nixon could not withdraw any copies over a three-year period unless he made or withdrew new copies of tapes and documents, that he could only withdraw any of the original tapes after five years, and that all of the tapes would be destroyed ten years after Nixon's death. Congress was upset as to how President Nixon's official business records were to be kept concealed from public review, and wanted to make President publicly accountable for his actions. Therefore, shortly after this confidentiality agreement was announced, Congress decided to introduce a bill that would provide for greater public access to Richard Nixon's records.

== The conflict ==
The main conflict in this case was whether a federal statute authorizing that the President would have his records inspected by government archivists violated the principles of separation of powers and executive privilege. In addition, there was a conflict in this case whether a President's personal materials were deemed private even though the public had a high level of interest in them. Furthermore, it was debatable whether the government's seizure of President Nixon's materials was actually "limited intrusion". The main conflict in this case was whether it was constitutional for government archivists to seize President Nixon's materials.

== Decision ==
The Supreme Court decided that the Presidential Recordings and Material Preservation Act was constitutional, ruling in favor of the Administrator of General Services in a 7-2 vote and rejecting all claims that Nixon made in his lawsuit against the Administrator of General Services. The Court rejected Nixon's claim that the Act violates the presidential privilege of confidentiality, finding that the government archivists that would review Nixon's documents and tape recordings had done so with other presidents' papers without violating the confidentiality of communications between presidents and their advisers. The past work by government archivists had not harmed the institution of the presidency. Furthermore, the Court stated that the review of documents by government archivists would be no more of an intrusion than an in camera inspection of documents permitted under the Court's majority decision in United States v. Nixon. The Court rejected the argument that the Act invaded Richard Nixon's right of privacy, as there would be limited intrusion through the screening of his documents, the public has a legitimate reason to want to know more about the President's historical documents (as he is a public figure), and the impossibility of separating the small amount of private materials without first thoroughly screening all of his documents. The Court determined that Richard Nixon's privacy rights were still protected under the Act, and that his complaints about his lack of privacy were overstated.

Beyond the questions of confidentiality, privilege and privacy, the Court found that the Act does not interfere with President Nixon's First Amendment rights of association. Further, the Court determined that the federal government had compelling reasons to preserve Nixon's Presidential materials, and archival screening was the least restrictive way to review presidential materials and to return private papers to the president. Finally, the Act did not violate the Bill of Attainder clause of the Constitution because this Act does not convict former President Nixon of a crime and does not expose him to prosecution. The Court commented that Congress was justified in approving the Act because Congress believed Nixon was a President who could serve as an example for future presidents. The Court determined that the purpose of this Act was not to punish President Nixon, but simply to legislate a policy that had a purpose of preserving important historical artifacts and presidential records.

Chief Justice Warren Burger and Justice William Rehnquist wrote dissenting opinions. Rehnquist vigorously argued that under the provisions of the Act, all presidential papers could be seized by Congress at any time, and the Act was thus excessive. Burger asserted that the Administrator was not justified in engaging in such an invasion of privacy with respect to a President's documents. In addition, Burger contended that the Administrator was also encroaching on President Nixon's Executive Privilege and that this Act amounted to an unconstitutional Bill of Attainder.
