= COVFEFE Act =

Proposed U.S. government bill

The Communications Over Various Feeds Electronically for Engagement Act

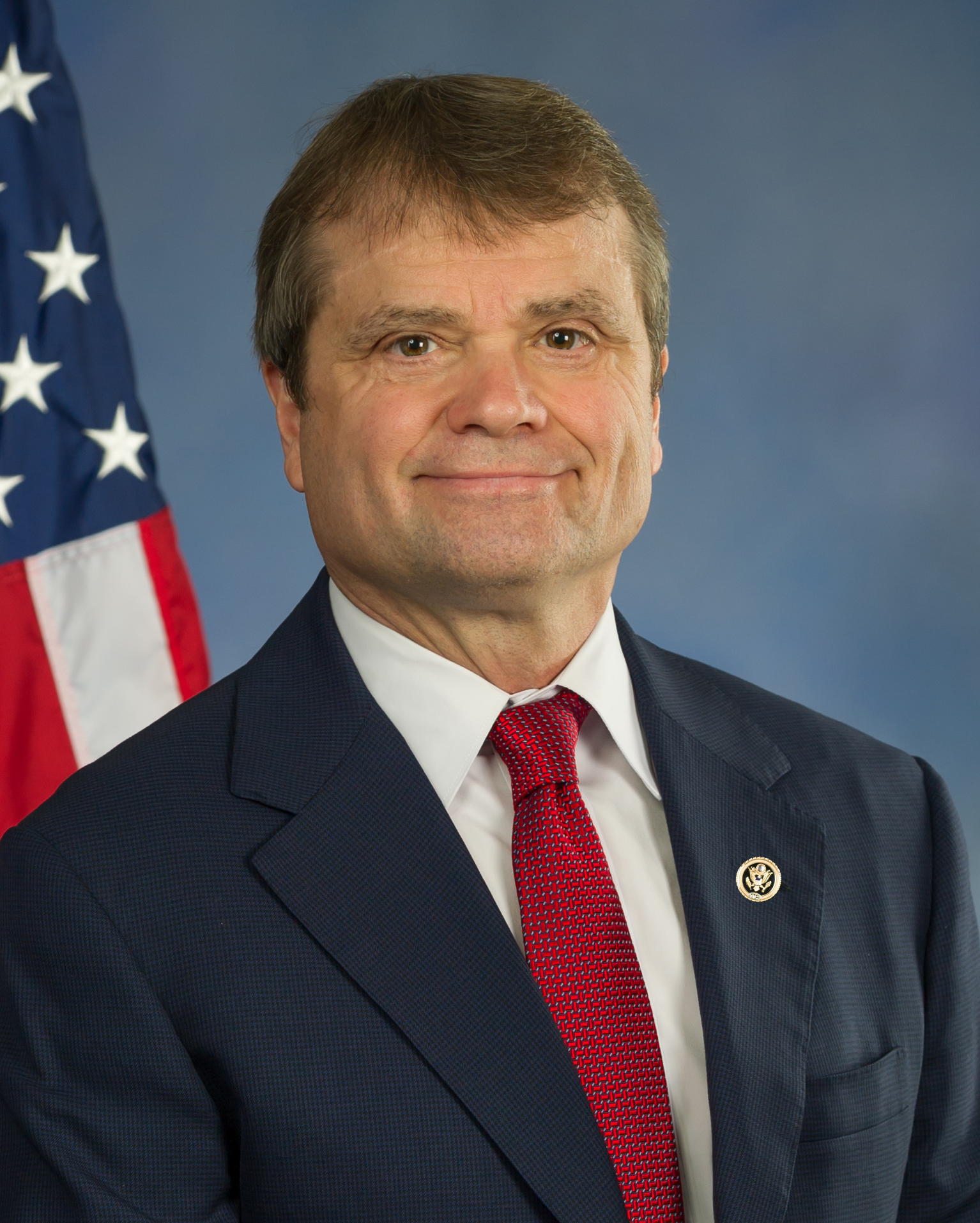
Democratic representative Mike Quigley introduced the legislation.

The Communications Over Various Feeds Electronically for Engagement Act (COVFEFE Act), House Bill H.R. 2884, was introduced in the United States House of Representatives on June 12, 2017, during the 115th United States Congress. The bill was intended to amend the Presidential Records Act to preserve Twitter posts and other social media interactions of the President of the United States and require the National Archives to store such items. H.R. 2884 was assigned to the House Oversight and Reform Committee for consideration. While in committee, there were no roll call votes related to the bill. The bill died in committee.

U.S. Representative Mike Quigley, Democrat of Illinois, introduced the legislation due to Donald Trump's routine use of Twitter, stating "In order to maintain public trust in government, elected officials must answer for what they do and say; this includes 140-character tweets. If the president is going to take to social media to make sudden public policy proclamations, we must ensure that these statements are documented and preserved for future reference". If enacted, the bill "would bar the prolifically tweeting president from deleting his posts, as he has sometimes done".

The COVFEFE Act would have also treated a president's personal social media accounts (e.g., Trump's "@realDonaldTrump" Twitter account) the same as official social media accounts (e.g., the "@POTUS" Twitter account).

== Background ==
The bill title refers to "covfefe", a word in a May 31, 2017 tweet that Trump sent at 12:06 AM EDT, reading "Despite the constant negative press covfefe". This incomplete tweet was liked and retweeted hundreds of thousands of times, making it one of the most popular tweets of 2017, as people speculated on its meaning. The tweet was deleted at 5:48 AM EDT. At 6:09 AM EDT, Trump's account tweeted "Who can figure out the true meaning of 'covfefe' ??? Enjoy!"

During the May 31 White House press briefing, Hunter Walker of Yahoo! News asked White House press secretary Sean Spicer about the tweet and if there was any concern about the president sending out incoherent tweets that stay up for hours. Spicer responded, "I think the president and a small group of people know exactly what he meant" and offered no other explanation. This unexpected response spawned additional media attention and criticism for its cryptic meaning, with commentators unsure whether or not Spicer was joking.

Callum Borchers of The Washington Post's The Fix noted that the Trump administration deliberately responded in a way that encouraged the media and the public to focus on covfefe instead of other controversies like the Russia investigation, resignation of White House communications director Michael Dubke, or U.S.-Germany relations.

== Legal significance of Trump's tweeting ==
Trump's tweets have been legally significant in the past. White House Press Secretary Sean Spicer stated that Trump's tweets are "considered official statements by the President of the United States".

Some of his tweets have contradicted his agenda by undercutting or contradicting statements of public officials as well as the arguments of U.S. Department of Justice attorneys seeking to defend Trump's decisions in court. A federal appellate court cited one of Trump's tweets in upholding a lower court's order blocking Trump's Executive Order 13780 from going into effect in 2017. Courts have been clear that Twitter statements can be used as evidence of intent.

Before Trump's "@realDonaldTrump" Twitter account was suspended, he blocked a number of users, preventing them from viewing his tweets or posting public replies. A group associated with Columbia University filed a lawsuit on behalf of blocked users, called Knight First Amendment Institute v. Trump. Plaintiffs successfully argued that @realDonaldTrump reply threads constituted a "designated public forum" akin to a public meeting, and therefore blocking users based on their political viewpoints violated their constitutional right to freedom of speech. The Second Circuit upheld this ruling on July 9, 2019.

Regardless of the failure of the bill, Trump's tweets have been archived in accordance with the Presidential and Federal Records Act Amendments of 2014.

== See also ==
- Presidential Records Act Amendments of 2007
