= Presidential Recordings and Materials Preservation Act =

1974 Act of United States Congress

- Other short titles: Presidential Recordings Preservation Act
- Long title: An Act to protect and preserve tape recordings of conversations involving former President Richard M. Nixon and made during his tenure as President, and for other purposes.
- Acronyms (colloquial): PRMPA
- Nicknames: Presidential Recordings and Materials Preservation Act of 1974
- Enacted by: the 93rd United States Congress
- Effective: December 19, 1974

Citations
- Public law: 93-526
- Statutes at Large: 88 Stat. 1695

Codification
- Titles amended: 44 U.S.C.: Public Printing and Documents
- U.S.C. sections amended: 44 U.S.C. ch. 21 § 2111; 44 U.S.C. ch. 33 §§ 3315-3324

Legislative history
- Introduced in the Senate as S. 4016 by Gaylord Nelson (D-WI) on September 18, 1974; Committee consideration by Senate Government Operations, House Administration; Passed the Senate on October 4, 1974 (56-7); Passed the House on December 3, 1974 (Passed) with amendment; Senate agreed to House amendment on December 9, 1974 (Agreed) with further amendment; House agreed to Senate amendment on December 9, 1974 (Agreed); Signed into law by President Gerald Ford on December 19, 1974

United States Supreme Court cases
- Nixon v. General Services Administration (1977)

The Presidential Recordings and Materials Preservation Act (PRMPA) of 1974 (Pub. L. 93–526, 88 Stat. 1695, enacted December 19, 1974, codified at 44 U.S.C. § 2111, note) is an act of Congress enacted in the wake of the August 1974 resignation of President Richard M. Nixon. It placed Nixon's presidential records into federal custody to prevent their destruction. The legislative action was intended to reduce secrecy, while allowing historians to fulfill their responsibilities.

== Application ==
The Act applies only to President Nixon's presidential materials. Under the statute, materials related to the Abuse of Governmental Power and the constitutional and statutory duties of the President and his White House staff are retained by the National Archives. The Act mandates that the National Archives preserve and process these materials, and prepare them for public access. The National Archives was required to segregate and return to Nixon's estate those materials identified as purely "personal-private" or "personal-political" and unrelated to the President's constitutional and statutory duties. The U.S. Supreme Court upheld the Act's constitutionality in Nixon v. Administrator of General Services.

== Legislative history ==
The Act was introduced as S. 4016 by Senator Gaylord Nelson on September 18, 1974; passed by both houses with amendments on December 9, 1974; and was signed into law by President Gerald Ford on December 19, 1974.

== See also ==
- Presidential Records Act
- Richard Nixon Presidential Library and Museum
- Executive Order 13233
