= Presidential Records Act =

American law

- Other short titles: Presidential Records Act, 1978
- Long title: An Act to amend title 44 to insure the preservation of and public access to the official records of the President, and for other purposes.
- Acronyms (colloquial): PRA
- Nicknames: Presidential Records Act of 1978
- Enacted by: the 95th United States Congress
- Effective: January 20, 1981

Citations
- Public law: Pub. L. 95–591
- Statutes at Large: 92 Stat. 2523

Codification
- Titles amended: Title 44—Public Printing and Documents
- U.S.C. sections created: 44 U.S.C. ch. 22 § 2201 et seq.

Legislative history
- Introduced in the House as H.R. 13500 by L. Richardson Preyer (D–NC) on July 17, 1978; Committee consideration by House Administration, House Government Operations; Passed the House on October 10, 1978 (Passed/Agreed); Passed the Senate on October 13, 1978 (Passed/Agreed) with amendment; House agreed to Senate amendment on October 14, 1978 (Passed/Agreed); Signed into law by President Jimmy Carter on November 4, 1978

The Presidential Records Act (PRA) of 1978, 44 U.S.C. §§ 2201–2209, is an Act of the United States Congress governing the official records of presidents and vice presidents created or received after January 20, 1981, and mandating the preservation of all presidential records. Enacted November 4, 1978, the PRA changed the legal ownership of the president's official records from private to public, and established a new statutory structure under which presidents must manage their records. The PRA was amended in 2014, to include the prohibition of sending electronic records through non-official accounts unless an official account is copied on the transmission, or a copy is forwarded to an official account shortly after creation.

== History ==
The Presidential Records Act was enacted in 1978 after President Richard Nixon sought to destroy records relating to his presidential tenure upon his resignation in 1974. The law superseded the policy in effect during Nixon’s tenure that a president's records were considered private property, making clear that presidential records are owned by the public. The PRA requires the president to ensure preservation of records documenting the performance of his official duties (44 U.S.C. § 2203(a)), provides for the National Archives and Records Administration (NARA) to take custody and control of the records (44 U.S.C. § 2203(g)), and sets forth a schedule of staged public access to such records (44 U.S.C. § 2204). Records covered by the PRA encompass documentary materials relating to the political activities of the president or members of the president’s staff if they concern or have an effect upon the carrying out of "constitutional, statutory, or other official or ceremonial duties of the President" (44 U.S.C. § 2201(2)).

=== Trump interpretations ===
During his federal indictment for retaining sensitive government records after the conclusion of his first term and storing them at his personal residence in Florida, Donald Trump asserted that the PRA authorized him to keep documents from his own presidency and shielded him against legal reprisals for doing so.

In April 2026, the Department of Justice's Office of Legal Counsel released an opinion declaring that Presidential Records Act was unconstitutional and that the president "need not further comply" with the law. Trump administration attorney T. Elliott Gaiser authored an opinion declaring that the Presidential Records Act unconstitutionally infringed on the president's executive authority and that Trump did not need to provide presidential records to the National Archives and Records Administration, claiming that the act was "untethered from any valid and identifiable legislative purpose". The American Historical Association and the watchdog organization American Oversight sued the administration in an effort to block Trump from using the opinion to justify destroying or keeping official records for himself. In May, a federal judge concluded the law is likely constitutional and granted a preliminary injunction ordering the government to continue complying with it.

The Trump Presidential Library is responsible for preserving records from the Trump White House. In 2026, the library said it could not find a single direct message sent by Trump on Twitter. The Washington Post wrote that there was evidence that Trump had sent direct messages on Twitter and that the failure to preserve them may be a violation of the Presidential Records Act.

== Provisions ==
Specifically, the Presidential Records Act:

- Defines and states public ownership of the records.
- Places the responsibility for the custody and management of incumbent presidential records with the president.
- Allows the incumbent president to dispose of records that no longer have administrative, historical, informational, or evidentiary value, once they obtained the views of the Archivist of the United States on the proposed disposal in writing.
- Establishes a process for restriction and public access to these records. Specifically, the PRA allows for public access to presidential records through the Freedom of Information Act (FOIA) beginning five years after the end of the Administration, but allows the president to invoke as many as six specific restrictions to public access for up to twelve years. The PRA also establishes procedures for Congress, courts, and subsequent administrations to obtain special access to records that remain closed to the public, following a 30‑day notice period to the former and current presidents.
- Requires that vice-presidential records are to be treated in the same way as presidential records.
- Establishes that presidential records automatically transfer into the legal custody of the Archivist as soon as the president leaves office.
- Establishes procedures for Congress, courts, and subsequent Administrations to obtain “special access” to records from NARA that remain closed to the public, following a privilege review period by the former and incumbent presidents; the procedures governing such special access requests continue to be governed by the relevant provisions of E.O. 13489
- Establishes in law that any incumbent presidential records (whether textual or electronic) held on courtesy storage by the Archivist remain in the exclusive legal custody of the president and that any request or order for access to such records must be made to the president, not NARA.
- Establishes preservation requirements for official business conducted using non-official electronic messaging accounts: any individual creating presidential records must not use non-official electronic messaging accounts unless that individual copies an official account as the message is created or forwards a complete copy of the record to an official messaging account. (A similar provision in the Federal Records Act applies to federal agencies.)
- Requires that the president and his staff take all practical steps to file personal records separately from presidential records.
- Prevents an individual who has been convicted of a crime related to the review, retention, removal, or destruction of records from being given access to any original records.
- Excludes documents which are official records of an agency, personal records, stocks of publications and stationery, or extra copies of documents produced only for convenience of reference.

== Related Executive Orders ==
- Executive Order 12667 – issued by President Reagan in January 1989, this executive order established the procedures for NARA and former and incumbent presidents to implement the PRA (44 U.S.C. §§ 2201–2207).
- Executive Order 13233 – this executive order, issued by President George W. Bush on November 1, 2001, superseded Reagan's previous executive order. The Bush executive order also included the documents of former Vice presidents.
- Executive Order 13489 – issued by President Barack Obama on January 21, 2009, restored the implementation of the PRA of 1978 as practiced under President Reagan's Executive Order 12667 and revoked President Bush's Executive Order 13233.
- Executive Order 13526 – issued by President Barack Obama on December 29, 2009, the executive order authorized a uniformity policy as related to classifying, declassifying, and safeguarding articles for the purposes of United States national security information.

== Proposed amendments ==
- Presidential Records Act Amendments of 2007, passed by the House on March 14, 2007.
- Presidential and Federal Records Act Amendments of 2014, enacted into law on November 26, 2014
- Communications Over Various Feeds Electronically for Engagement Act of 2017, named after President Trump's "covfefe" tweet

== See also ==
- Bush White House e-mail controversy
- Joe Biden classified documents incident
- Espionage Act of 1917
- Mike Pence classified documents incident
- FBI investigation into Donald Trump's handling of presidential documents
- Presidential Recordings and Materials Preservation Act
- Federal Records Act of 1950
- Records Act of 1789
- Freedom of Information Act of 1966
- Records management
