= Archival Recovery Program =

Program of the US National Archives and Records Administration

External videos
- National Archives dispatches recovery team to hunt for missing treasures, The Washington Post

The Archival Recovery Team of the National Archives and Records Administration (NARA) investigates documents and other items that have been lost or stolen from NARA, utilizing news, auction houses and websites, collector shows, and tips. Operating as part of NARA's Office of the Inspector General, they have had some notable successes in recovering items like presidential pardons from Ulysses S. Grant and Andrew Jackson and a Frederic Remington bronco statue given to George H. W. Bush. The Archival Recovery Team was created in 2006 by the Office of the Inspector General after thefts by NARA employees and researchers occurred. In August 2015, responsibility for non-law enforcement recovery activities was transferred from the Office of the Inspector General to the NARA Office of the Chief Operating Officer.

There is considerable challenge in monitoring the National Archives, which contain more than ten billion letters, maps, reports, videos, and audio recordings, hundreds of thousands of artifacts, and 6.7 billion electronic files. A comprehensive item-by-item inventory has never been performed because of this size, so even recognizing that items are missing is difficult.

As of 2011, the team has recovered over 7,000 items.

== Notable recoveries ==
- In October 2011, the residence of Leslie Waffen, the department chief of audio and film, was raided and two trucks of material were recovered.
- In March 2016, the patent application for the Wright brothers "Flying Machine" was recovered after being missing since approximately 1980.
- In April 2018, historian Antonin DeHays was sentenced to 364 days in prison for the theft of government records and ordered to pay more than $43,000 in restitution to the unwitting buyers who purchased the stolen goods from him.
