= Federal Depository Library Program =

U.S. federal government program

Logo for a Federal Depository Library

The Federal Depository Library Program (FDLP) is a government program created to make U.S. federal government publications available to the public at no cost. As of April 2021, there are 1,114 depository libraries in the United States and its territories. A "government publication" is defined in the U.S. Code as "informational matter which is published as an individual document at Government expense, or as required by law" (44 U.S.C. 1901).

== History ==
The groundwork for the FDLP was established by an 1813 Congressional Joint Resolution ordering that certain publications be distributed to libraries outside of the federal government. Initially, the librarian of Congress was responsible for running this program, but the responsibility shifted to the secretary of the interior in the 1850s.

The Printing Act of 1895 revised public printing laws and established the roles of the FDLP and the Government Printing Office (GPO) in distributing government information. This act also assigned leadership of the program to the Superintendent of Public Documents, who would be under the control of the GPO and added executive documents to the distribution list.

The Depository Library Act of 1962 (DLA) created the present-day FDLP as codified in Title 44, Chapter 19 of the U.S. Code. The DLA allowed two depository libraries in each Congressional district, eliminated postage charges to depository libraries receiving material, provided for the distribution of non-GPO documents, permitted independent federal agencies to be eligible for depository designation, and created regional depository libraries.

The Government Printing Office Electronic Information Access Enhancement Act of 1993 (P.L. 103-40), codified in Title 44, Chapter 41 of the U.S. Code, requires the Superintendent of Documents to maintain an electronic directory of federal electronic information, provide online access to the Congressional Record, Federal Register and other select publications, and operate an electronic storage facility. The electronic service now includes over 2,200 databases and is available via http://www.govinfo.gov.

On January 4, 2020, the FDLP website was hacked and defaced with pro-Iranian/anti-US messaging in response to the American airstrike that killed Qasem Soleimani, the commander of Iran's Quds Force. The FDLP site was taken offline, then restored the next day following a security analysis.

== Structure ==
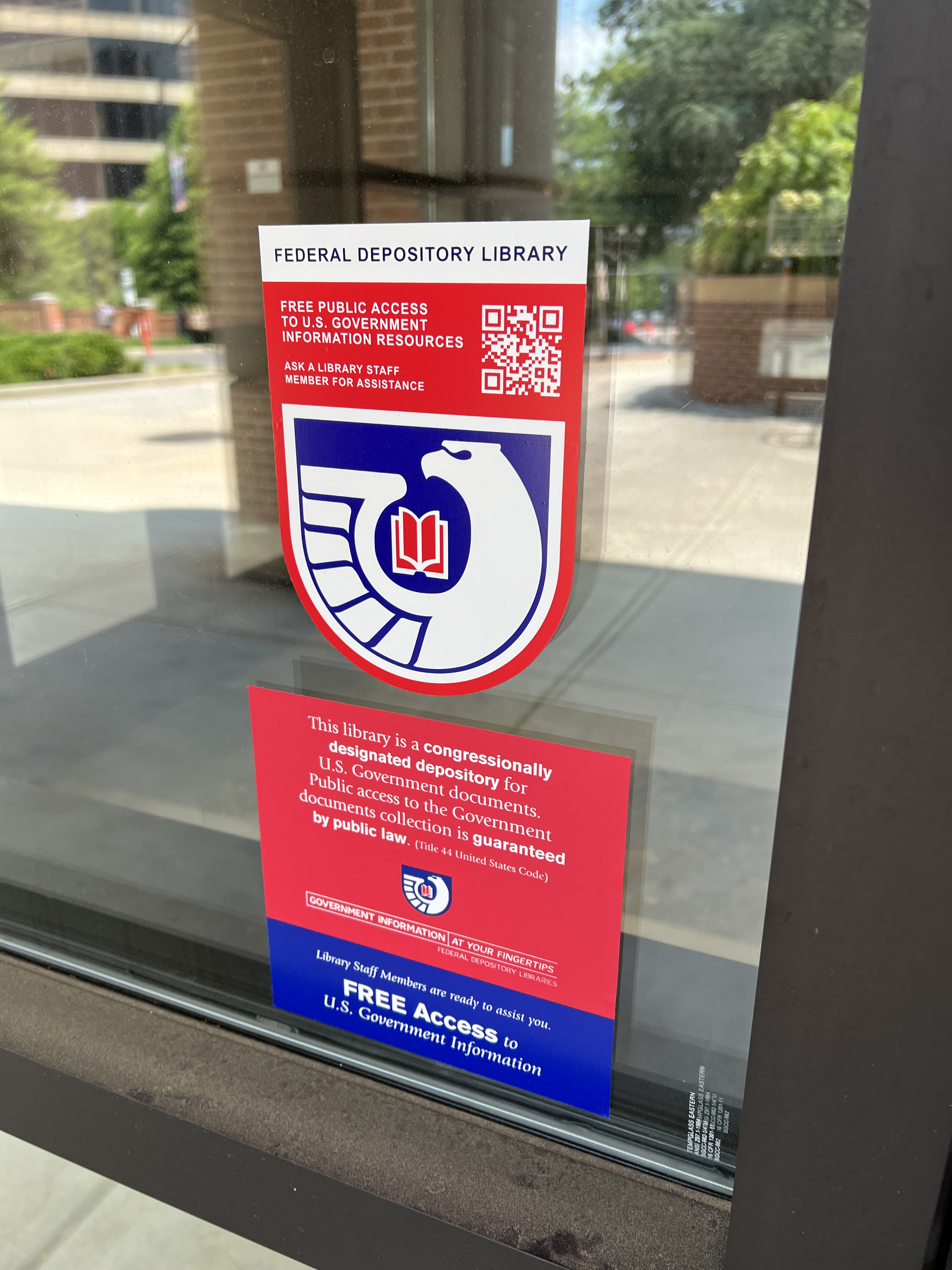
A sign notifying the public that this library is a designated depository of the FDLP

The Government Publishing Office (GPO) is responsible for printing and distributing government documents and overseeing the FDLP. There are several important individuals in charge of maintaining the link between GPO and the FDLP:

- The director of the U.S. Government Publishing Office, formerly the Public Printer, is responsible for overseeing the FDLP and for designating certain depository libraries. Their nomination must be approved by the Joint Committee on Printing.
- The Superintendent of Documents is responsible for monitoring policy creation and the operations of the FDLP. The Superintendent may designate depository libraries, and supervise the GPO sales program. The Superintendent may also ask depository libraries to destroy a certain publication or return it to the GPO.
- The director of Library Services and Content Management (LSCM) is responsible for staffing the FDLP and for providing interested parties with up-to-date communications.
- The Depository Library Council to the Public Printer (DLC) was created in 1972 and serves as an advisory committee to the Public Printer and the Superintendent of Documents. The DLC addresses such issues as improving public access, optimizing resources, indexing and classification, format, storage and administration. The council consists of fifteen members who are appointed by the Public Printer, and they serve three year terms, with five members retiring and five new members stepping in each year. The council meets at least twice per year.

=== Types of depository libraries ===
There are two types of depository libraries:

1. Regional depository library. Each state, and Puerto Rico, may have a maximum of two regional libraries, though most have one. It is the responsibility of regional libraries to retain a copy of all government publications received, and to provide services such as interlibrary loan and reference to selective depository libraries it serves. Regional libraries must also assist selective libraries in disposing of unwanted items. The majority of regional depository libraries are academic institutions. As of March 2018, there are 46 regional depository libraries, with six states being served by regional libraries in other states. Territories in the Pacific are served by the University of Hawaiʻi at Mānoa and Puerto Rico is served by the University of Florida. Wyoming is not served by a regional library.
2. Selective depository library. There may only be two selective depositories per Congressional district; there may be more only in the event that a Congressional district has been reconfigured after a decennial census. Selective depositories choose to receive certain classes of documents from the government, which are chosen from the List of Classes. Selective libraries choose materials which will best serve their clientele.

=== Attaining FDLP status ===
There are four ways in which a library may qualify for FDLP status:

1. Each U.S. representative may delegate two qualified libraries if their district is not already being adequately served by a depository library. Each senator may designate an additional two libraries in their state. The governor of American Samoa and the governor of Guam may each designate one library if vacancies exist. The resident commissioner of Puerto Rico may designate two libraries if vacancies exist. The governor of the U.S. Virgin Islands may designate two libraries if vacancies exist (one each for Saint Thomas and Saint Croix). The mayor of the District of Columbia may also designate two libraries if vacancies exist.
2. Each senator may designate two existing depository libraries as regional depositories if their state is not already being adequately served by regional depository libraries. The resident commissioner of Puerto Rico may also designate two libraries if vacancies exist.
3. An institution may be specially designated as a depository by an act of congress and be provided materials in the "same form as supplied to other designated depositories." Only two independent institutions have been given this designation, the Public Library of the District of Columbia and Northern Marianas College. Congress designated each executive department and service academy as a depository.
4. A library may be given FDLP status via "by-law designations" (Title 44 of the U.S. Code). Any library that meets the following criteria qualifies for FDLP status:
  1. Land-grant colleges and universities (44 U.S.C. § 1906)
  2. Libraries of federal agencies. Multiple libraries can be designated for executive departments and independent agencies while not exceeding the number of major bureaus or divisions. (44 U.S.C. § 1907)
  3. Highest appellate court of a state (44 U.S.C. § 1915)
  4. Accredited law schools (44 U.S.C. § 1916)

=== Responsibilities and maintaining depository status ===
Libraries with depository status are required to provide the documents received at no cost to their patrons. Though they receive the publications free of charge, depository libraries are responsible for the costs of processing the items and making them available. All depository libraries must make their collections of these documents available to the general public, and the services provided for government documents must be on par with the services offered to the primary users of a library. Circulation policies for government documents, however, are established by each library itself. Libraries may house the materials however they like; for example, they may separate the government documents from the rest of their collection or they may integrate them. A library cannot filter Internet search results at public access stations as access to health or biological science articles may not be infringed upon.

Depository libraries must maintain collections of at least 10,000 books, not including the collection of government documents. A depository library may voluntarily resign from its position as a depository library, or it may be stripped of its depository status by the Superintendent of Documents if it does not carry out its responsibilities as enumerated in the U.S. Code. In either case, the library must properly dispose of the government documents it acquired while part of the program as these publications are the property of the U.S. Government. The documents would generally be returned to the state regional library and then redistributed to selected libraries within the state.

== FDLP collections ==
Libraries are required to maintain a series of titles known as the FDLP Basic Collection. Beyond this, libraries order the materials that best suit the needs of their patrons; there is no selection percentage criterion that must be met. The FDLP offers the opportunity to order several kinds of material for libraries' collections, including maps, Braille, large print documents, foreign language items, and audio.

=== Core Collection ===
The Core Collection was established in 1977. Every depository library is required to have certain publications available for use. These include, among others:

- Budget of the United States Government
- Catalog of U.S. Government Publications
- Code of Federal Regulations
- Congressional Directory
- Congressional Record (daily)
- Federal Register (daily)
- Statistical Abstract of the United States
- United States Code

=== Selecting items ===
Libraries select the documents they wish to receive from the List of Classes of United States Government Publications Available for Selection by Depository Libraries and the Union List of Item Selections. This is a document listing all of the classes of items available for selection through the program and their associated item numbers. Each item with an item number is available through the FDLP program. Because of the large number of documents published by the government each year, the documents are arranged into categories of related classes from which to choose. By selecting a class, the library receives all of the documents within that class. Selections made during the year take effect on October 1. The Union List of Item Selections updates the titles in the List of Classes on a semiannual basis.

=== Deselecting items ===
Unlike adding items, selections may be removed at any time; the library stops receiving the documents within 72 hours.

=== Retention of documents ===
Selective depository libraries must keep government documents in their collections for five years minimum, after which time the items may be removed from the collection with the approval of a regional library. Items marked for disposal must be offered first to the regional, then to other depositories (44 U.S.C. § 1912). All depository libraries, including regional libraries, may dispose of items that have been superseded or issued later in bound form (44 U.S.C. § 1911). If an item has been deselected, the library must still retain the publications it possesses from that item number for five years before they may be discarded. Libraries may not financially benefit from the disposal of depository publications.

== Electronic documents ==
After 1996, government publications increasingly shifted to online formats; in addition, most Federal publications now originate online. Regional libraries still continue to collect information in a wide variety of formats, but many government documents are now published exclusively online. Electronic documents positively impact issues such as storage, length of retention, and access, which can be enhanced with library networking.

Libraries may substitute electronic documents for tangible documents as the only copy of the item in the collection, as long as the electronic document is complete, official, and permanently accessible. Access to electronic documents is provided through Persistent Uniform Resources Locators (PURL) and is facilitated by GovInfo and the Catalog of U.S. Government Publications (CGP).

== See also ==
- Legal deposit
- National Technical Reports Library
- Ralph J. Bunche Library
- Category:United States federal depository libraries
