= Federal Records Act =

U.S. law governing records management

- Other short titles: Federal Property and Administrative Services Act of 1949 Amendments
- Long title: An Act to amend the Federal Property and Administrative Services Act of 1949, and for other purposes.
- Nicknames: Federal Records Act of 1950
- Enacted by: the 81st United States Congress
- Effective: September 5, 1950

Citations
- Public law: Pub. L. 81–754
- Statutes at Large: 64 Stat. 578 aka 64 Stat. 583

Codification
- Titles amended: 44 U.S.C.: Public Printing and Documents
- U.S.C. sections created: 44 U.S.C. ch. 31 § 3101 et seq.

Legislative history
- Introduced in the Senate as S. 3959 by John Little McClellan (D-AR) on July 24, 1950; Committee consideration by Senate Expenditures; Passed the Senate on July 26, 1950 (Passed); Passed the House on August 7, 1950 (Passed, in lieu of H.R. 9129); Reported by the joint conference committee on August 25, 1950; agreed to by the House on August 31, 1950 (Agreed) and by the Senate on August 31, 1950 (Agreed); Signed into law by President Harry S. Truman on September 5, 1950

The Federal Records Act of 1950 is a United States federal law that was enacted in 1950. It provides the legal framework for federal records management, including record creation, maintenance, and disposition.

== History ==
The Federal Records Act was created following the recommendations of the Hoover Commission (1947-49). It implemented one of the reforms proposed by Emmett Leahy in his October 1948 report on Records Management in the United States Government, with the goal of ensuring that all federal departments and agencies had a program for records management.

The act, and its related regulations, require each federal agency to establish an ongoing program for record management and to cooperate with the National Archives and Records Administration (NARA). A 1985 NARA pamphlet describes the Federal Records Act as the "basis for the Federal Government's policies and procedures for creating, maintaining, and disposing of Federal records. The act and its related regulations define federal records, mandate the creation and preservation of those records necessary to document federal activities, establish government ownership of records, and provide the exclusive legal procedures for the disposition of records." The Second Hoover Commission (1953-55) addressed paperwork management and recommended the adoption of a program relating to "directives management, reports management, paperwork quality control, and clerical work measurement." As a result, the first Guide to Record Retention Requirements was published in 1955. This guide is updated annually and is used by archivists and other record managers both in and out of government.

The Federal Records Act was amended over time. Amendments in 1976 emphasized paperwork reduction and information lifecycle management. The Paperwork Reduction Act of 1980, which followed the issuance of the report of the Commission on Federal Paperwork in 1977, introduced information resources management and gave responsibility to the Office of Management and Budget for creating federal information policy standards.

In November 2014, the Presidential and Federal Records Act Amendments of 2014 was signed into law by President Barack Obama. This bipartisan act, which followed the 2011 President's Memorandum on Managing Government Records, modernizes the Federal Records Act. The act expressly expands the definition of federal records to include electronic records (the first change to the definition of "Federal record" since the enactment of the act in 1950). The act also grants the archivist of the United States the final determination as to what constitutes a federal record; "authorizes the early transfer of permanent electronic federal and presidential records to the National Archives, while legal custody remains with the agency or the president"; "clarifies the responsibilities of federal government officials when using non-government email systems"; and "empowers the National Archives to safeguard original and classified records from unauthorized removal."

== See also ==
- Diplomatics
- Federal Property and Administrative Services Act of 1949
- Freedom of Information Act (United States)
- Government transparency
- National Personnel Records Center and National Personnel Records Center fire
- Presidential Records Act of 1978
- Privacy Act of 1974
- Right to know
- Washington National Records Center
