= Washington National Records Center =

Records repository in Maryland, U.S.

Coordinates: 38.8508°N 76.9421°W

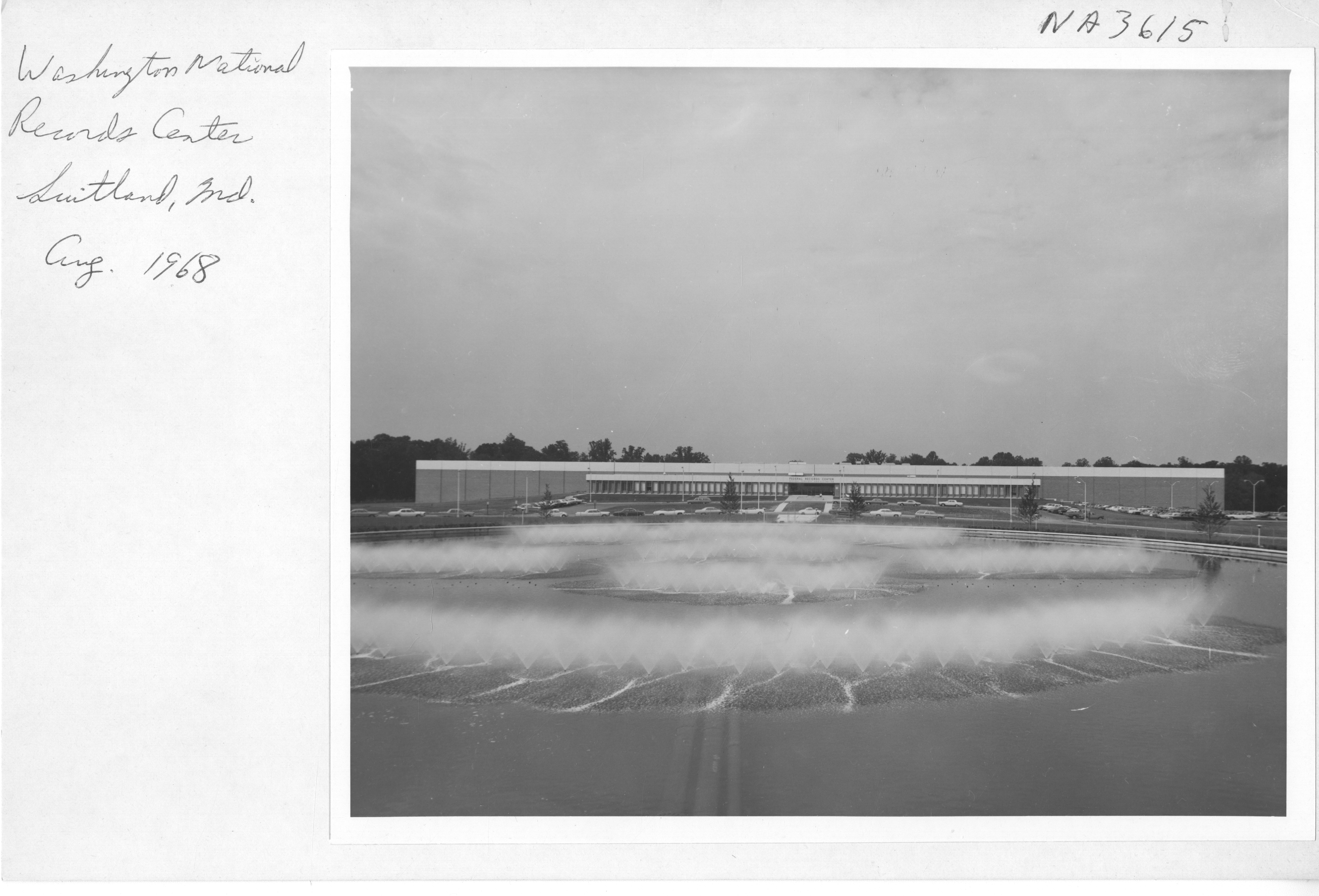
Washington National Records Center

The Washington National Records Center (WNRC) in Suitland, Maryland, stores and references records of U.S. federal agencies located in the District of Columbia, Maryland, Virginia and West Virginia.

Physical records are transferred to WNRC when they are no longer needed by the respective agencies but have not met their scheduled retention period, including the records of the Federal Courts in DC and the Armed Forces. Those records remain at the WNRC until acceptance as permanent records by the National Archives, or else they are destroyed and recycled. The records are tracked individually in a database from the time they arrive at the WNRC. While court records are freely available to the public, the majority of records are controlled by their respective originating agency, and all records are subject to the access restrictions specific to that agency and national security classification.

The WNRC encompasses approximately 789,000 square feet (73,300 m^{2}) of space and has a capacity to hold over 3.9 million cubic feet (110,000 m^{3}) of federal records. Security systems, and fire suppression systems protect the records in the center. Upon arrival, visitors to the center must go through security, sign in, and present photo identification at the guard's station in the entrance lobby.

In 2007, the WNRC opened a new Electronic Records Vault. The 976 square-foot vault allows Federal Records Centers to store and service temporary electronic records for federal agencies. This was after a major criminal fire on February 29, 2000, which destroyed 700,000 pages, as reported by archives officials.

== War crimes lists ==
In May 1986, The New York Times headlined that master lists of more than 36,000 files of war criminals, suspects and witnesses had been discovered on an "open shelf" in the military archive, that were kept secret in the United Nations archives for nearly 40 years. The United Nations War Crimes Commission operated in London from 1943 to 1948, and collected evidence on war crimes committed by the governments of its 17 members at the time. While investigating the charges, a case file on each individuals or unit was opened. The lists, consisting of around 3,000 pages in total, were found accidentally on a shelf in the basement of the WNRC by Richard L. Boylan, an archivist, while searching for other documents. "It didn't strike me as anything special, because they have been available," he said. There are 80 mimeographed lists in total, that were assembled chronologically by the United Nations War Crimes Commission from 1943 to 1948. The lists contain major WWII figures such as Adolf Hitler and Benito Mussolini and some of the most wanted Nazi war criminals sought by governments worldwide, amongst them Alois Brunner, a former deputy of Adolf Eichmann, Walter Kutschmann, a former Gestapo leader, Dr. Hans Wilhelm König, a former deputy of Josef Mengele at Auschwitz as well as former secretary general Kurt Waldheim.

The list also includes German industrialists and factory owners accused of exploitation of forced labor, Jewish prisoners used by the Germans as prison guards, and Japanese soldiers wanted for war crimes by Australia, Italian, Albanian, Bulgarian, Hungarian and Romanian war criminals.
