= Official Congressional Directory =

Official directory of the United States Congress

- Author: United States Congress Joint Committee on Printing
- Language: English
- Subject: Political reference
- Genre: Non-fiction
- Publisher: United States Government Printing Office
- Publication date: 1789
- Publication place: United States
- Media type: Print (paperback)

The Official Congressional Directory (also known as Congressional Directory) is the official directory of the United States Congress, prepared by the Joint Committee on Printing (JCP) and published by the United States Government Printing Office (GPO) since 1887. Directories since the 41st Congress (1869–1871) are available online from the Government Publishing Office. Per federal statute (44 USC 721) the Directory is published and distributed during the first session of each new Congress. It is a designated essential title distributed to Federal depository libraries and the current edition is available for purchase from GPO.

== Description ==
The foreword notes: The Congressional Directory is one of the oldest working handbooks within the United States Government. While there were unofficial directories for Congress in one form or another beginning with the 1st Congress in 1789, the Congressional Directory published in 1847 for the 30th Congress is considered by scholars and historians to be the first official edition because it was the first to be ordered and paid for by Congress. With the addition of biographical sketches of legislators in 1867, the Congressional Directory attained its modern format.

Each bi-annual edition includes:

- Short biographies of each member of the Senate and House, listed by state or district.
- Committee memberships, terms of service, administrative assistants and/or secretaries, and room and telephone numbers for Members of Congress.
- Lists officials of the courts, military establishments, and other Federal departments and agencies, including D.C. government officials, governors of states and territories, foreign diplomats, and members of the press, radio, and television galleries.
