= McBurney v. Young =

- Supreme Court of the United States

Argued Feb. 20, 2013 Decided April 29, 2013
- Full case name: Mark J. McBurney, et al. v. Nathaniel L. Young, Deputy Commissioner and Director, Virginia Division of Child Support Enforcement
- Docket no.: 12-17
- Citations: 569 U.S. 221 (more) 133 S. Ct. 1709; 185 L. Ed. 2d 758

Case history
- Prior: Motion to dismiss granted, McBurney v. Mims, No. 3:09-cv-44, 2009 WL 1209037 (E.D. Va. Apr. 29, 2009); reversed in part and remanded sub. nom., McBurney v. Cuccinelli, 616 F.3d 393 (4th Cir. 2010); summary judgment granted, 780 F. Supp. 2d 439 (E.D. Va. 2011); affirmed, 667 F.3d 454 (4th Cir. 2012); cert. granted, 568 U.S. 936 (2012).

Holding
- A state can limit requests for state government documents exclusively to citizens of that state.

Court membership
- Chief Justice John Roberts Associate Justices Antonin Scalia · Anthony Kennedy; Clarence Thomas · Ruth Bader Ginsburg; Stephen Breyer · Samuel Alito; Sonia Sotomayor · Elena Kagan

Case opinions
- Majority: Alito, joined by unanimous
- Concurrence: Thomas

McBurney v. Young, 569 U.S. 221 (2013), was a United States Supreme Court case in which the Court upheld Virginia's and all states' right to restrict citizen requests for state government documents to citizens of that state.

The court rejected claims that this restriction is in violation of the Privileges and Immunities Clause because state government document requests are not a "fundamental" privilege nor immunity of citizenship. The court also upheld that the Virginia Freedom of Information Act does not violate the Dormant Commerce Clause of the United States Constitution.

== Background ==
Petitioners Mark J. McBurney and Roger W. Hurlbert are citizens of Rhode Island and California respectively. McBurney and Hurlbert each requested documents under the Virginia Freedom of Information Act, but their requests were denied because of their citizenship.

McBurney is a former resident of Virginia whose ex-wife is a Virginia citizen. After his ex-wife defaulted on her child support obligations, McBurney asked the Commonwealth's Division of Child Support Enforcement to file a petition for child support on his behalf. The agency complied, but only after a 9-month delay. McBurney attributes that delay to agency error and says that it cost him nine months of child support. To ascertain the reason for the agency's delay, McBurney filed a request under the Virginia Freedom of Information Act seeking "all emails, notes, files, memos, reports, letters, policies, opinions" pertaining to his family, along with all documents "regarding [his] application for child support: and all documents pertaining to the handling of child support claims like his. The agency denied McBurney's request on the ground that he was not a Virginia citizen. McBurney later requested the same documents under Virginia's Government Data Collection and Dissemination Practices Act, and through that request he received most of the information he had sought that pertained specifically to his own case. He did not, however, receive any general policy information about how the agency handled claims like his.

Hurlbert is the sole proprietor of Sage Information Services, a business that requests real estate tax records on clients' behalf from state and local governments across the United States. In 2008, Hurlbert was hired by a land/title company to obtain real estate tax records for properties in Henrico County, Virginia. He filed a Virginia Freedom of Information Act request for the documents with the Henrico County Real Estate Assessor's Office, but his request was denied because he was not a Virginia citizen.

== Opinion of the Court ==
Justice Alito delivered the majority opinion of the unanimous Court. Justice Thomas additionally submitted a concurring opinion. Alito examined whether Virginia Freedom of Information Act violated either the Privileges and Immunities Clause of the Constitution or the Dormant Commerce Clause. The Virginia act provides that "all public records shall be open to inspection and copying by any citizens of the Commonwealth", but it grants no such right to non-Virginians.

"Petitioners, who are citizens of other States, unsuccessfully sought information under the Act and then brought this constitutional challenge. We hold, however, that petitioners' constitutional rights were not violated. By means other than the state FOIA [freedom of information act], Virginia made available to petitioners most of the information that they sought, and the Commonwealth's refusal to furnish the additional information did not abridge any constitutionally protected privilege or immunity. Nor did Virginia violate the Dormant Commerce Clause. The state Freedom of Information Act does not regulate commerce in any meaningful sense, but instead provides a service that is related to state citizenship. For these reasons, we affirm the decision of the Court of Appeals rejecting petitioners' constitutional claims."

Justice Thomas while concurring with the opinion of the court, specifically criticizes the relevance of the Dormant Commerce Clause in the US Constitution stating "The negative Commerce Clause has no basis in the text of the Constitution, makes little sense, and has proved virtually unworkable in application, and, consequently, cannot serve as a basis for striking down a state statute."

== Responses ==
While seven US states have laws restricting requests for state government documents to their citizens (Alabama, Arkansas, Missouri, New Hampshire, New Jersey and Tennessee), only about half of them enforce these restrictions. The McBurney ruling could potentially lead to more states enforcing restrictive access, especially with states having financial constraints. In light of bolstered state residency requirements, MuckRock, a website that facilitates filing government document requests digitally, asks citizens of different states to help with filing them. While the ruling means states can discriminate against non residents, they are not required to. The New Jersey attorney general said out-of-state requests should generally be fulfilled and the Tennessee open records counsel Ann V. Butterworth notes that the law "does not forbid providing access to others".
