= Executive Order 12958 =

1995 United States executive order

Executive Order 12958 created new standards for the process of identifying and protecting classified information, and led to an unprecedented effort to declassify millions of pages from the U.S. diplomatic and national security history. In 1995, United States President Bill Clinton signed this Executive Order.

EO 12958 was amended and effectively replaced by President George W. Bush on March 25, 2003, in Executive Order 13292 (text). EO 13292 has itself since been revoked and replaced. The current EO in effect for classified information is Executive Order 13526 (text).
