= Executive Order 13292 =

On US Classified National Security Information

- Further amendment to Executive Order 12958, as amended, classified national security information

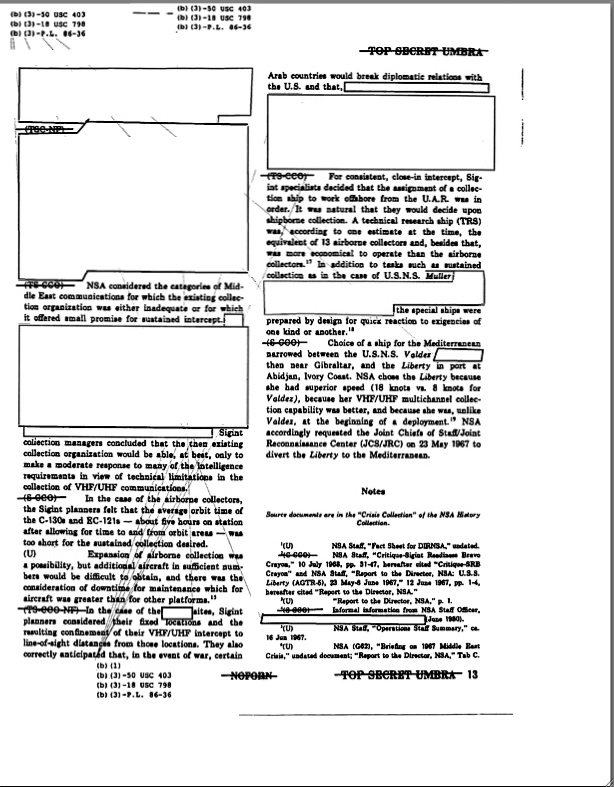
- An example of a U.S. classified document; page 13 of a United States National Security Agency report
- Type: Executive order
- Number: 13292
- President: George W. Bush
- Signed: March 25, 2003

Federal Register details
- Federal Register document number: 03-7736
- Publication date: March 28, 2003
- Document citation: 68 FR 15315

Summary
- Changed the classification and handling of sensitive and classified information by the United States Government.

Executive Order 13292 was an executive order issued by United States President George W. Bush on March 25, 2003, entitled "Further Amendment to Executive Order 12958, as Amended, Classified National Security Information." The Executive Order modified the manner in which sensitive information was handled at the time as set out by President Bill Clinton's 1995 executive order.

== Background ==
Clinton's order set declassification deadlines for classified material and made it harder for politicians to classify information. Bush's order appears to allow much more information to be classified and for longer periods; the wording is hard to decipher in some areas. It also appears to give more power over classification to the Offices of the President and Vice President, but the wording used was not properly defined in the listing of relevant definitions now consolidated into their own section in Part 6 of the Executive Order.

== Changes from the 1995 regulations ==
Among the various changes made to the 1995-based regulations, Executive Order 13292 notably:

- eliminated the 1995-based order's standard that information should not be classified if there is “significant doubt” about the need to do so;
- treated information obtained in confidence from foreign governments as classified;
- authorized the Vice President, “in the performance of executive duties,” to classify information originally;
- added “infrastructures” and “protection services” to the categories of classifiable information;
- eased the reclassification of declassified records;
- postponed the starting date for automatic declassification of protected records 25 or more years old from April 17, 2003, to December 31, 2006;
- eliminated the requirement that agencies prepare plans for declassifying records;
- canceled the order requiring the Archivist to create a “government wide database of information that has been declassified,” and instead requires the “Director of the Information Security Oversight Office ... [to] coordinate the linkage and effective utilization of existing agency databases of records that have been declassified and publicly released”; and
- permitted the Director of Central Intelligence to block declassification actions of the ISCAP, unless overruled by the President.

A more extensive analysis of the changes from the previous executive order was compiled by the group Public Citizen.

== Reactions ==
Then-Vice President Dick Cheney said in a February 15, 2006, interview, "There is an executive order that specifies who has classification authority, and obviously focuses first and foremost on the President, but also includes the Vice President." This was based in the then newly added but undefined and untested wording stipulating the Vice President's ability to exercise classification authority rested “in the performance of [his] executive duties,”. The phrase no longer appears in Executive Order 13526 though the Vice President is directly listed rather than amended in separately via a standard Order.

Byron York of the National Review noted, "Throughout Executive Order 13292, there are changes to the original Clinton order which, in effect, give the vice president the power of the president in dealing with classified material....Executive Order 13292 is further evidence of real power in the vice president's office."

This analysis is contradicted by the supplemental Order of October 13, 1995 issued pursuant to Sec. 1.4 (a)(2) of President Clinton's Executive Order 12958 of April 17, 1995 declaring the Vice President as a designated official with the same ability to originate classified information at the highest level, "Top Secret", and by design - the lower-levels and further delegations by default, as if named directly in the original Executive Order pursuant to the clause directly preceding it [Sec. 1.4(a)(1)]. The subsequent revisions to the regulations governing Classified National Security Information practices by both Presidents Bush and Obama differed from EO 12958 in that they declared the Vice President directly in their original issuances rather than in a supplemental Order as President Clinton had.

== Repealment ==
Executive Order 12958 and the amendments incorporated into it, including Executive Order 13292, were revoked by President Barack Obama in the issuance of Executive Order 13526.
