= Executive Order 13526 =

2009 United States executive order

- Classified National Security Information
- Type: Executive order
- Number: 13526
- President: Barack Obama
- Signed: December 29, 2009

Federal Register details
- Federal Register document number: E9-31418
- Publication date: January 5, 2010
- Document citation: 75 FR 705

Executive Order 13526 was issued on December 29, 2009, by United States President Barack Obama. It is one of a series of executive orders from US Presidents outlining how classified information should be handled. It revokes and replaces the previous Executive Orders in effect for this, which were EO 12958 (text) and EO 13292 (text).

== Issuance ==
EO 13526 was introduced as part of the Obama Administration's initiative to improve transparency and open-access to the Federal Government and the information it produces. It was formally introduced upon President Obama taking office in late January 2009.

One factor prompting its issuance was the large backlog of documents scheduled to be automatically declassified on December 31, 2009, and how to deal with that reality. Another factor was delivering on a campaign promise.

These latest regulations, at the time, went into full effect on June 25, 2010, except for sections 1.7, 3.3, and 3.7, which were effective immediately on December 29, 2009.

== Significant changes ==
EO 13526 restated the authorized list of designees who can originate classification, in effect rescinding any previous designations made by officials or agency heads to subordinates.

A significant provision of EO 13526 is the creation of the National Declassification Center. The major focus is the idea that information should become declassified systematically as soon as practicable. Specific time limits are mentioned for different kinds of information, but there is also the provision that information that still needs to be classified can stay classified. Mechanisms are outlined for periodic reevaluation of the need to classify information, even if the result of the evaluation is to keep the information classified

== See also ==
- Classified information
- Classified information in the United States
- Previous Executive Orders covering national classified information:
  - Executive Order 10290 (September 24, 1951; Harry S. Truman)
  - Executive Order 10501 (November 5, 1953; Dwight D. Eisenhower)
  - Executive Order 11652 (March 8, 1972; Richard Nixon)
  - Executive Order 12065 (June 28, 1978; Jimmy Carter)
  - Executive Order 12356 (April 2, 1982; Ronald Reagan)
  - Executive Order 12958 (April 17, 1995; Bill Clinton)
  - Executive Order 13292 (March 21, 2003; George W. Bush)
