= Title 44 of the United States Code =

U.S. federal statutes on printing and documents

Title 44 of the United States Code outlines the role of public printing and documents in the United States Code.

== Chapters ==
The title contains 41 chapters:

- Chapter 1: Joint Committee on Printing
- Chapter 3: Government Printing Office
- Chapter 5: Production and Procurement of Printing and Binding
- Chapter 7: Congressional Printing and Binding
- Chapter 9: Congressional Record
- Chapter 11: Executive and Judiciary Printing and Binding
- Chapter 13: Particular Reports and Documents
- Chapter 15: Federal Register and Code of Federal Regulations
- Chapter 17: Distribution and Sale of Public Documents
- Chapter 19: Depository Library Program
- Chapter 21: National Archives and Records Administration
- Chapter 22: Presidential Records
- Chapter 23: National Archives Trust Fund Board
- Chapter 25: National Historical Publications and Records Commission
- Chapter 27: Advisory Committee on the Records of Congress
- Chapter 29: Records Management by the Archivist of the United States and by the Administrator of General Services
- Chapter 31: Records Management by Federal Agencies
- Chapter 33: Disposal of Records
- Chapter 35: Coordination of Federal Information Policy
- Chapter 37: Advertisements by Government Agencies
- Chapter 39: Government Printing Office: Office of Inspector General
- Chapter 41: Access to Federal Electronic Information
