= Bradford Wilson =

American author and academic

- Official portrait, 2026

12th Archivist of the United States
- Incumbent
- Assumed office August 21, 2026
- President: Donald Trump
- Preceded by: Edward Forst (acting)

Personal details
- Born: Bradford Pentony Wilson
- Spouse: Elle Wilson
- Children: 3
- Education: North Carolina State University (BA); Northern Illinois University (MA); Catholic University (PhD)

Bradford Pentony Wilson is an American professor and writer who has served as the archivist of the United States since 2026. He previously served as Executive Director of the James Madison Program at Princeton University.

In March 2026, President Donald Trump nominated Wilson to serve as Archivist of the United States.

== Early life and education ==
Wilson attended North Carolina State University, where he obtained a Bachelor of Arts. Following this, he earned a Master of Arts from Northern Illinois University, and a Ph.D. in Politics from Catholic University of America.

== Career ==
Wilson has most notably served as the Executive Director of the James Madison Program at Princeton University. He is also a Senior Research Fellow in the Witherspoon Institute, a socially conservative think tank.

Wilson has previously served as a Fellow of Forbes College at Princeton University, Erskine-Canterbury Fellow at the University of Canterbury, Fulbright Senior Scholar at Moscow State University, and Visiting Scholar at Utah Valley University. He has edited or co-authored several books, was previously Editor of the journal Academic Questions, and is a fellow of the Civitas Institute, a conservative think tank.

From 1984 to 1987, Wilson served as Research Associate to chief justices Warren E. Burger and William H. Rehnquist. From 1996 to 2004, Wilson served as Acting President, and later Executive Director, of the National Association of Scholars, a conservative group. Since 2006, he has served as President of the Association for the Study of Free Institutions. In February 2010, Wilson spoke at the Sumner School in Washington, D.C. in an event sponsored by the Federalist Society about responsible contributions to higher education.

=== Political appointments ===
In July 2023, President Joe Biden appointed Wilson as a trustee of the James Madison Memorial Fellowship Foundation.

In March 2026, President Donald Trump nominated Wilson to serve as Archivist of the United States. Due to Trump's past handling of presidential documents, Wilson was expected to be questioned on his interpretation of the Presidential Records Act during his Senate confirmation hearing. In April 2026, Bradford's nomination was endorsed by the conservative National Association of Scholars and Witherspoon Institute, asserting that he had made "enduring contributions to the study and preservation of our nation's foundational principles." In contrast, the Society of American Archivists, the largest professional association of archivists in North America, expressed hope that Wilson would, if confirmed, "actively engage the American archivist profession" to demonstrate how he would, as Archivist, uphold the values of the archivist profession in regards to "open government, equitable access to information, and...advocacy on behalf of...records held...for the American people." The professional association also sent a letter to the United States Senate Committee on Homeland Security and Governmental Affairs, in June 2026, asking about five topics: Presidential Records Act, records management by the National Archives, electronic records, "advocacy for NARA's funding and independence," and expanding access to the agency's records.

In April 2026, Edward Forst, head of the Government Services Administration, began serving as acting Archivist of the United States, while Wilson awaited Senate confirmation. During a hearing for his nomination, in June 2026, before the United States Senate Committee on Homeland Security and Governmental Affairs, he stated that "preservation, transparency, and accessibility" would continue to remain at the heart of the agency, if he was confirmed, along with a program focusing on the agency's holdings for "civic education" of those living within the U.S., including about U.S. history.

On August 7, 2026, the United States Senate confirmed Wilson as Archivist of the United States in a 51-47 party-line vote, along with 69 other individuals nominated by President Donald Trump, before the Senate went on its scheduled August recess.

== Personal life ==
Wilson and his wife, Elle, have three children, as well as several grandchildren.

== Bibliography ==
=== Books ===
- Wilson, Bradford P.; Holloway, Carson, eds. (2023). The Political Writings of George Washington. Cambridge University Press. ISBN 978-1009344043.
- Wilson, Bradford P.; Holloway, Carson, eds. (2017). The Political Writings of Alexander Hamilton. Cambridge University Press. ISBN 978-1108422239.
- Wilson, Bradford P., ed. (2015). The Constitutional Legacy of William H. Rehnquist. West Academic. ISBN 978-1634594929.
- Wilson, Bradford P.; Masugi, Ken, eds. (1998). The Supreme Court and American Constitutionalism. Maryland: Rowman & Littlefield. ISBN 978-0847686599.
- Wilson, Bradford P.; Schramm, Peter W. (1994). Separation of Powers and Good Government. Maryland: Rowman & Littlefield. ISBN 978-0847678990.
- Wilson, Bradford P.; Schramm, Peter W., eds. (1993). American Political Parties and Constitutional Politics. Maryland: Rowman & Littlefield. ISBN 978-0847678204.
- Wilson, Bradford P. (1986). Hyman, Harold; Bruchey, Stuart (eds.). Enforcing the Fourth Amendment: A Jurisprudential History. American Legal and Constitutional History: A Garland Series of Outstanding Dissertations. New York: Garland Publishing, Inc. ISBN 978-0824083038.

=== Academic articles ===
- “La teoria politica fondante la Costituzione Americana, con particolare riferimento alla separazione dei poteri e al giudizio di costituzionalità,” in Questioni Civiche: Forme, Simboli e Confini della Cittadinanza (Italy: Edizioni Diabasis, 2010): 358-88
- "Constitution Day," Academic Questions, vol. 20, no. 1 (Winter 2006-07): 22-31.
- "Separation of Powers and Judicial Review," in Separation of Powers and Good Government, ed. Bradford P. Wilson and Peter W. Schramm (Lanham, Maryland: Rowman & Littlefield, 1994): 63-85
- "Clinton, the Courts, and Social Policy," Social Science and Modern Society, vol. 31, no. 3 (March/April 1994): 64-68. Reprinted in Bruce Stinebrickner, ed., American Government 95/96, 25th ed. (Guilford, CT: The Dushkin Publishing Group, 1995): 106-10
- "The Fourth Amendment As More Than a Form of Words: The View from the Founding," in Eugene W. Hickok, Jr., ed., The Bill of Rights: Original Meaning and Current Understanding (Charlottesville: University Press of Virginia, 1991): 151-71
- The Exclusionary Rule, Commentary and Study Guide for "The Exclusionary Rule," the first segment of 22-part PBS series Crime File, moderated by James Q. Wilson (Washington, D.C.: National Institute of Justice, 1986)
- "Enforcing the Fourth Amendment: The Original Understanding," The Catholic Lawyer, 28:173-98 (1983)
- "The Origin and Development of the Federal Rule of Exclusion," Wake Forest Law Review, 18:1073-1109 (1982)

=== Guest articles ===
- "The American Constitution: Covenant or Curse?", Civitas Outlook (July 4, 2025)
- "Why Constitution Day?", Deseret News (Sep. 16, 2024)
- "The Anti-Federalists — our other founding fathers", Deseret News (Feb. 3, 2026)
- Wilson, Bradford P.; Holloway, Carson, "Hamiltonian Nationalism: A Response to Samuel Gregg", The Public Discourse (July 15, 2020)
