= Ernst Posner =

Prussian state archivist

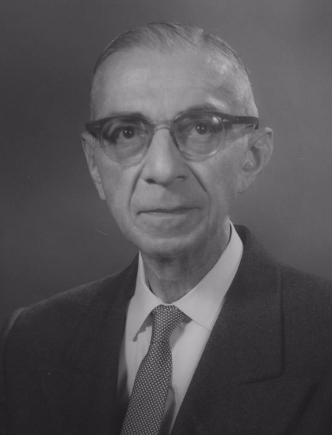
- Posner in 1964
- Born: Ernst Maximilian Posner; August 9, 1892; Berlin, Germany
- Died: April 18, 1980 (aged 87); Germany
- Occupations: Archivist; Historian
- Known for: "Dean of American Archivists"
- Notable work: Archives in the Ancient World

Ernst Maximilian Posner (9 August 1892 – 18 April 1980) was a Prussian state archivist who fled to the United States during World War II where he served as the history department chairman, dean of the graduate school, and director of the School of Social Science and Public Affairs at American University. Additionally, he was a frequent archival consultant to the United States government.

== Early life and education ==
Posner was born on August 9, 1892, in Berlin to a wealthy Prussian Lutheran family of both Jewish and Christian heritage. His father, Dr. Carl Posner, was a famous urologist. His uncle, Max Posner, who died ten years before Ernst was born, was an archivist with the Prussian Privy State Archives. Posner attended the University of Berlin where he studied philosophy, history, and languages. He attributed a class that he took with German historian Otto Hintze on U.S. Constitutional history as providing him with the basic knowledge he would need for American history later in his life.

Having previously served in the military during peace-time, he rejoined Imperial German Army during World War I on both the Eastern and Western fronts. He fought in the battles of Tannenberg and the Masurian Lakes. He was wounded in Poland in November 1914. After receiving treatment, he returned, now as a lieutenant, to the front and fought in both Russia and France. In 1918 he was mustered out of the army. He was awarded both the first and second class of the Iron Cross. After the war Posner returned to the University of Berlin where he received his doctorate in February 1920. Later that year he passed the exams necessary to teach in a gymnasium.

== Career in Germany ==
Posner began his professional career working for the Prussian State Privy Archive in 1921. He first began with a proto-archivist position and then became a journeymen archivist. At the Archive he helped alter the arrangement and description for all government records that were newly retired. He also rearranged older archival material dating back to the Prussian monarchy. Eventually he became an administrator charged with the responsibility of the Hausreferent. Concurrently, he was heavily involved in the Prussian Academy of Sciences. He published numerous articles and often lectured at the Institute for Archival Science and Advanced Historical Studies of the Privy Archives.

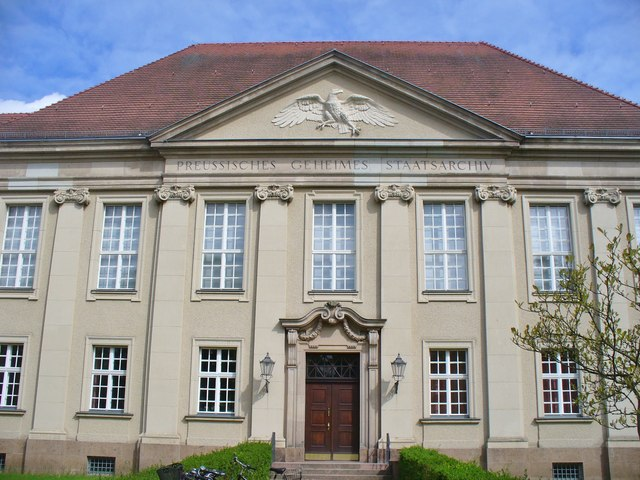
Prussian Privy State Archives

== Leaving Germany ==
In 1937 Albert Brackmann, the Director-General of the Privy State Archives, wrote a letter of recommendation vouching for Posner's archival abilities and popularity. Brackmann did this as a way to vouch for Posner under the early years of Hitler's Nuremberg Laws. Posner had to take leave of his various positions and in 1937 he and his wife, Kathe, decided to emigrate to the United States. Posner traveled to the United States for two months in the spring of 1938. With the help of friends, Eugene Anderson of American University in Washington, Waldo Gifford Leland of the American Council of Learned Societies, Solon J. Buck of the National Archives, Posner began to position himself within the world of archives in America. At the National Archives he delivered the Good Friday 1938 lecture on the topic of German archival administration. However, the National Archives was reticent to offer employment to an alien. Posner then traveled to Harvard, Yale, the Rockefeller Foundation, and the Oberlander Trust looking for any type of employment. Since he was not successful, he eventually returned to Germany. In November 1938, after Kristallnacht, he was arrested and sent to the Sachsenhausen Concentration Camp.

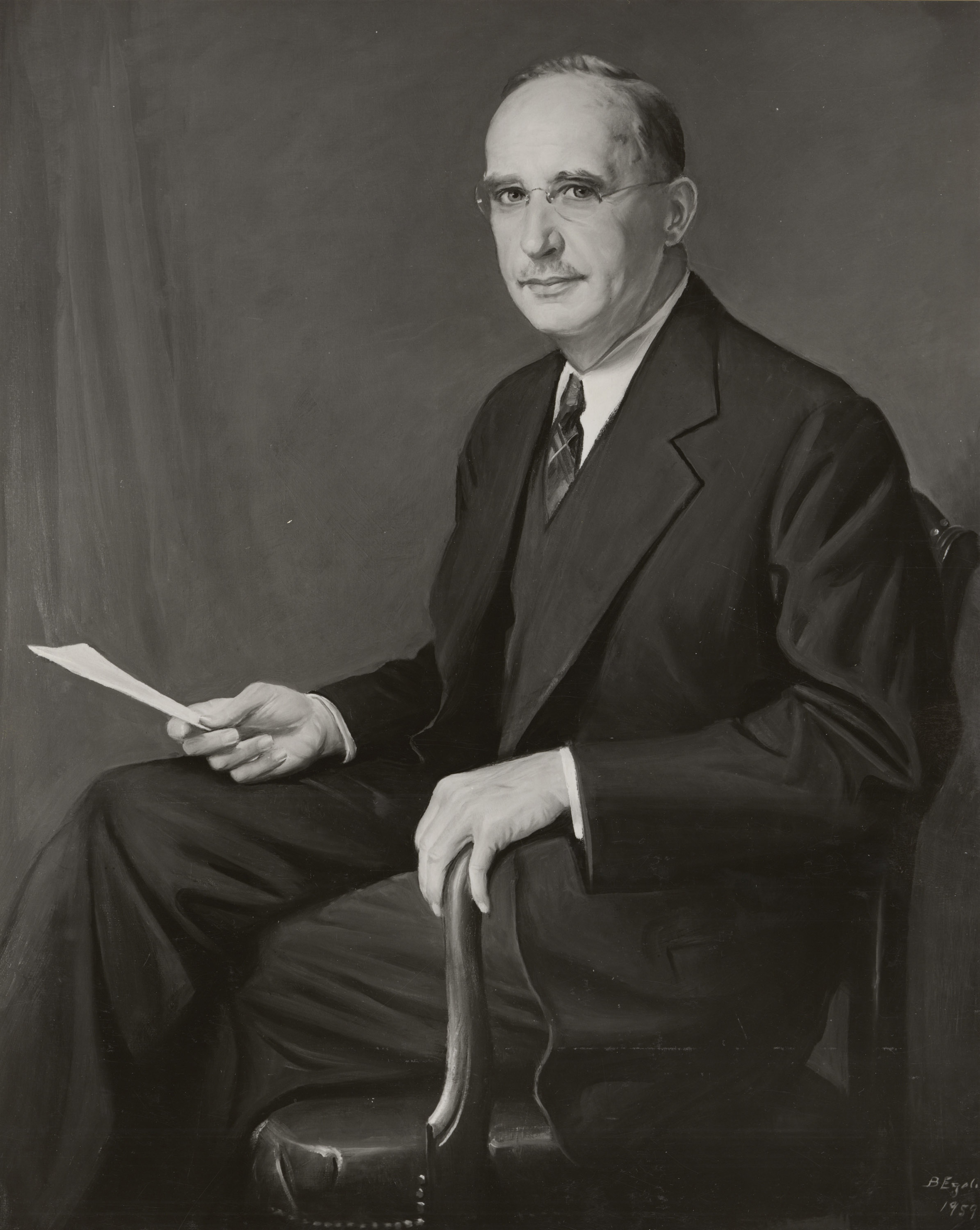
Dr. Solon Buck

After six weeks, through the help of his wife and a German officer, he was released. In 1939 American University offered him a lectureship in archival administration. Still needing a visa, the Posners ended up in Sweden for four months where he was able to present a lecture entitled "Archival Administration in the United States." Soon after, the American Consul General in Stockholm provided the Posners with visas. As his wife was still in Berlin they both made their way separately to London and then to New York without any of their belongings.

American University

== Career in the United States ==
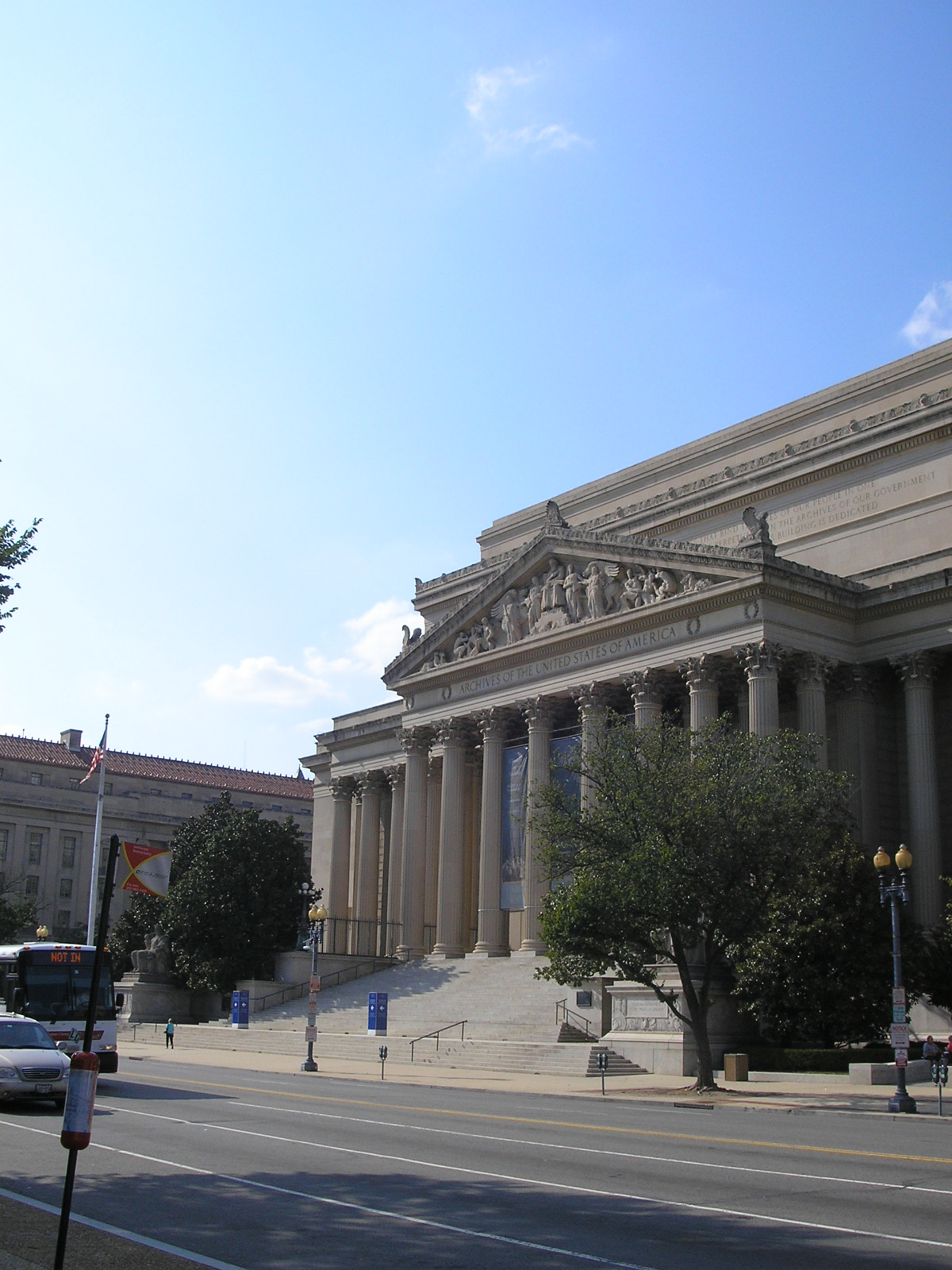
The United States National Archives

Posner spent the next twenty-two years working at American University. Posner, carrying on the dream of Solon J. Buck, began to establish a program for archivists in the United States. For a period of two years, beginning in 1939, Posner and Buck taught a class entitled "The History and Administration of Archives." Most of the students in the class were staff members of the National Archives. This included five archivists who would one day become presidents of the Society of American Archivists: Philip C. Brooks, Oliver W. Holmes, Philip Hamer, Elizabeth Edwards (later Elizabeth Hamer Kegan), and Herbert Angel. When Buck was appointed as the Archivist of the United States in 1941, Posner took control of the influential course.

In 1943 Posner gave a famous lecture (later published as "Public Records under Military Occupation") which was among the first calls for plans to administer captured German records. In November 1944, Posner prepared a report on the German archival profession, including biographical sketches and estimates of political views, for 72 leading German archivists. He wrote numerous War Department manuals relating to German and Italian record-keeping practices and served as an advisor for the United States Army's Department Records Branch on German documents. These documents were eventually used as evidence at many crucial war crimes trials.

Posner’s German heritage was questioned by many when he applied for citizenship in 1943. For example, Posner was accused by Senator Kenneth McKellar for attempting to make the bombing of the National Archive easier by switching the records boxes from steel into cardboard. However, on February 16, 1944, Buck appeared before the Senate Subcommittee on Independent Agencies and defended Posner.

Posner also held various positions at American University. They included acting as the chairman of the History Department (1947 - 1961), director of the School of Social Sciences and Public Affairs (1947 - 1961), and dean of the Graduate School (1955 - 1957). One of his responsibilities as Graduate School dean was counseling prospective students. This included Jacqueline Kennedy Onassis when she was considering working towards an M.A. in history.

Posner took great pride in one of the courses that he offered during summers entitled "The Institute on the Preservation and Administration of Archives". According to his own words, "[i]t became the prototype of many such courses now being offered in various parts of the country and has helped to create some esprit de corps and to impart professional know how to those working in the archives field."

From 1940 - 1967 he published and reviewed articles in the American Archivist, American Historical Review, Der Archivar, Archivum, Indian Archives, and other periodicals. He also essayed articles on archives for Collier's Encyclopedia and the Encyclopedia Americana.

Posner's 1964 work, American State Archives, “told an uncomplimentary story of archival lethargy or neglect in about three quarters of the states of the Union." At that time, Posner's research showed that twelve states did not have any official archivists and that nine of those had no formalized system for the management of permanent government records. In the years following the publication of the book many states began to follow the archival standards proposed by Posner.

One of Posner's most famous books, published in 1972, is entitled Archives in the Ancient World. Posner sought to record the history of archival administration beginning, as few did before him, the ancient world. In the introduction to the work, he argues that "[...] archivists must feel a need to explore the origins of their profession, to understand the circumstances and forces that have determined its evolution, and, with such understanding, to anticipate and-prepare for the future".

For his role in the development of American archival theory and practice, he was sometimes called "the Dean of American archivists." From 1955 - 1956 Posner served as the 11th president of the Society of American Archivists.

In 1972, Posner and his wife returned to Europe where they settled in Wiesbaden, Germany.

== Selected publications ==
- Drei Vorträge zum Archivwesen der Gegenwart. Stockholm: Alb. Bonnier, 1940
- American state archives. Chicago; London: University of Chicago Press, 1964
- Archives & the public interest: selected essays (Washington: Public Affairs Press, 1967)
- Archives in the ancient world. Cambridge, Mass.: Harvard University Press, 1972. ISBN 9780674044630

== Honors ==
- From 1957 - 1958 Posner was a Guggenheim Fellow and Fulbright Grantee in Rome, Italy.
- In 1967, Posner was awarded the Great Cross of Merit of the Federal Republic of Germany.
- In 1968, the American Association for State and Local History gave him an award of distinction. The organization said that he was "[...] responsible, more than any other person, for the development of the archival profession in this country".
- Since 1983, the Society of American Archivists has been awarding the Ernst Posner Prize for an "outstanding essay dealing with some facet of archival administration, history, theory, and/or methodology that was published during the preceding year in The American Archivist."
- The Ernst Posner building at the German National Archives in Berlin is named after Posner.
