= Edward Forst =

American businessman (born 1960)

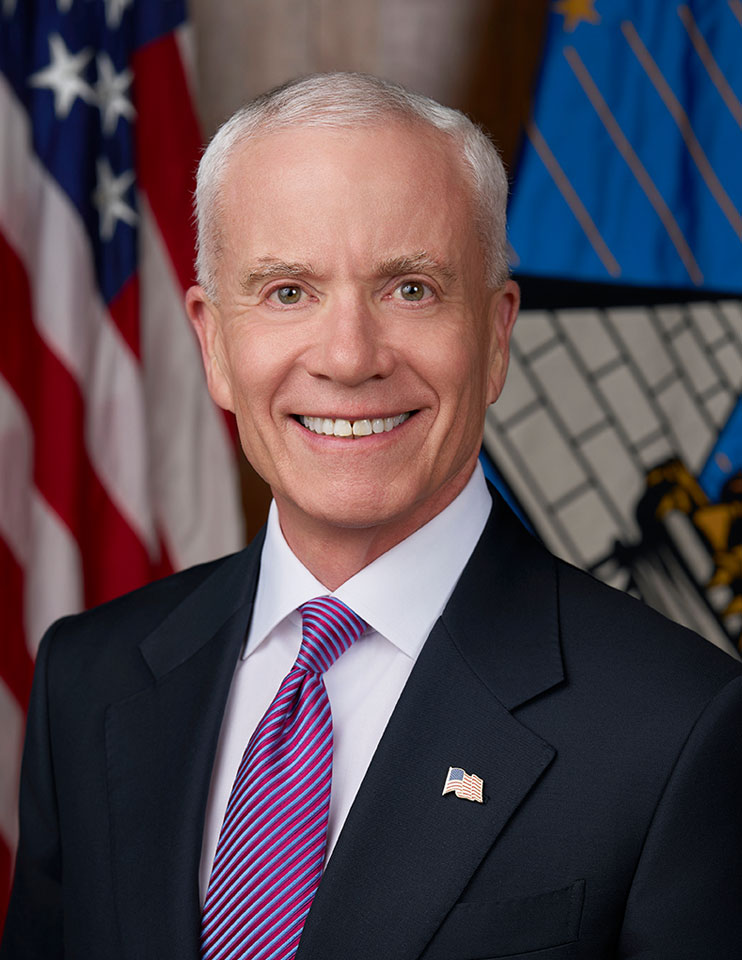
- Official portrait, 2026

Administrator of General Services
- Incumbent
- Assumed office December 24, 2025
- President: Donald Trump
- Preceded by: Robin Carnahan

Acting Archivist of the United States
- In office April 3, 2026 – August 21, 2026
- President: Donald Trump
- Preceded by: Marco Rubio (acting)
- Succeeded by: Bradford Wilson

Executive Vice President of Harvard University
- In office September 1, 2008 – August 1, 2009
- President: Drew Gilpin Faust
- Preceded by: Position established
- Succeeded by: Katherine Lapp

Personal details
- Born: Edward Codd Forst; December 1960 (age 65) Chicago, Illinois, U.S.
- Spouse: Susan Ryan (m. 1993)
- Education: Harvard University (BA); University of Pennsylvania (MBA)

Edward Codd Forst (born December 1960) is an American businessman who has served as the administrator of general services since December 2025. Forst has additionally served as the acting archivist of the United States since April 2026.

Forst graduated from Harvard University with a bachelor's degree in economics in 1982, later attending the Wharton School at the University of Pennsylvania. He began working for Bankers Trust in 1982 as a managing director. In 1994, Forst joined Goldman Sachs, becoming a managing director in 1996 and a partner in 1998. In 2004, he was appointed as the company's chief administrative officer, and in 2007, he became the co-head of Goldman Sachs Asset Management. Forst temporarily left Goldman Sachs in 2008 to serve as Harvard's executive vice president.

Forst returned to Goldman Sachs in September 2009 as the firm's senior strategy officer. In February 2010, he was appointed head of Goldman Sachs Asset Management. Amid complications involving his leadership style and weeks after he did not appear at a critical meeting in Europe, Forst was removed from Goldman Sachs in December 2010. Forst began serving as Cushman & Wakefield's president and chief executive in January 2014. He led a strategy to return Cushman & Wakefield to New York City's real estate market. Forst left the company after its acquisition by DTZ in May 2015.

In July 2025, president Donald Trump nominated Forst to serve as the administrator of General Services. He appeared before the Senate Committee on Homeland Security and Governmental Affairs in October. Forst was confirmed by the Senate in December and was sworn in that month. In April 2026, Forst was appointed as the acting archivist of the United States.

== Early life and education (1960–1988) ==
Edward Codd Forst was born in December 1960, in Chicago, Illinois. Forst was the son of Eleanore Ann Thole (née Codd) and Donald S. Forst. His stepfather, Jack Thole, was a chemistry teacher at St. Ignatius College Prep. The younger Forst attended St. Ignatius. He graduated cum laude from Harvard University in 1982 with a bachelor's degree in economics and from the Wharton School at the University of Pennsylvania with a master of business administration in 1988.

== Career ==
=== Bankers Trust (1982–1994) ===
Forst began working for Bankers Trust in 1982 and became a managing director. By 1993, he was the head of United States loan sales and trading. That year, he married Susan Kelly Ryan, a vice president at Bankers Trust.

=== Goldman Sachs and advisorships (1994–2011) ===
Forst began working for Goldman Sachs in 1994. Within four years, he became co-head of capital markets, chief of staff of the equities and fixed income instruments, currencies, and commodities divisions, and co-head of global credit businesses. Forst became a managing director in 1996. Additionally, he served as chair of the Firmwide Capital Committee. In October 1998, Goldman Sachs named Forst as a partner. In 2004, he was appointed as the company's chief administrative officer. Goldman Sachs moved to relocate Forst to London in February 2007 to oversee business operations in the U.S., Europe, and Asia. In September, Forst was appointed co-head of Goldman Sachs Asset Management. He left Goldman Sachs in June 2008 to serve as Harvard University's first executive vice president, assuming the position in September. Amid a financial crisis, secretary of the treasury Henry Paulson named Forst as an advisor for his US$700 billion recovery plan. Forst helped establish the Office of Financial Stability. He returned to Harvard in October. Forst retired in August 2009.

In September 2009, Goldman Sachs rehired Forst as the firm's senior strategy officer. He succeeded Marc Spilker as head of Goldman Sachs Asset Management in February 2010. Forst was a sponsor for the Firmwide Black Network and the Firmwide Hispanic/Latin Network. In addition, he was a member of Goldman Sachs' executive committee. According to The New York Times, Forst was a "controversial figure" within Goldman Sachs as a "difficult manager" who often conflicted with employees. In November 2011, he failed to appear at a critical meeting in Europe. Weeks later, in December, Goldman Sachs announced that Forst was retiring. According to the Times, the move was an ouster that was met by praise by some employees, particularly those within the firm's investment management division. After leaving Goldman Sachs, Forst was an advisor to Fenway Partners.

=== Cushman & Wakefield (2014–2015) ===
In December 2013, Cushman & Wakefield announced that Forst would serve as the company's president and chief executive. He began his position the following month. Forst's strategy involved reasserting Cushman & Wakefield in the New York City real estate market; most prominently, he led the company's acquisition of the building sales firm Massey Knakal in December 2014. Forst sought to leverage Massey Knakal's contacts and Cushman & Wakefield's global network. By February 2015, he had led the strategic review committee examining a potential sale of the company. According to The Wall Street Journal, Forst sought to find a replacement for Exor, Cushman & Wakefield's parent company, that would provide the capital necessary for expansion, rather than sell the company to a competitor. In May, DTZ agreed to acquire Cushman & Wakefield; after the acquisition completed, Forst left the company.

=== Board memberships and political activities ===
Forst served as the vice chairman and later chairman of the Bond Market Association beginning in 2004 and the co-chairman and later chairman of the Securities Industry and Financial Markets Association beginning in 2006. By 2011, he was a trustee of Carnegie Hall and held several positions within Harvard University, including serving as co-chair of the university's Taskforce on Balanced Philanthropy and its 30th Reunion campaign, in addition to being a board member of Harvard's Stem Cell Science Advisory Board. As treasurer of Carnegie Hall, Forst was responsible for ousting Ronald Perelman, its chairman, in a private dispute.

In June 2013, Forst attended a summit in Utah hosted by Mitt Romney, where Romney stated his intentions to remain in politics as a public commentator. He met with Romney again in January 2015 at an event in which Romney stated he was considering running for president in the 2016 election.

== Administrator of the General Services Administration ==
On July 31, 2025, president Donald Trump nominated Forst to serve as the administrator of the General Services Administration. He appeared before the Senate Committee on Homeland Security and Governmental Affairs on October 23, arguing that the General Services Administration is central to Trump's government efficiency agenda. Forst was confirmed by the Senate on December 18, in a bloc of nominees before the Senate adjourned. He was sworn in on Christmas Eve in Indian River Shores, Florida, by its mayor, Brian Foley. Forst was serving jury duty at the time. In April 2026, Forst was named as the acting archivist of the United States.

== Works cited ==
=== Articles ===
- Brewster, Deborah (September 26, 2007). "Forst to co-head Goldman Sachs division". Financial Times.
- Craig, Susanne; Lattman, Peter (December 2, 2011). "High-Level Goldman Executive Is Leaving the Firm". The New York Times.
- de la Merced, Michael; Bray, Chad (May 11, 2015). "DTZ Agrees to Buy Cushman & Wakefield for $2 Billion". The New York Times.
- Douglas, Helen (December 31, 1960). "Chit Chat". Journal Gazette and Times-Courier.
- "Forst/Ryan". Syracuse Herald-Journal. December 19, 1993.
- Gelles, David (February 25, 2015). "Cushman & Wakefield Is Said to Be Up for Sale". The New York Times.
- Goldfarb, Jeffrey; Cox, Rob (June 20, 2008). "In Lawsuit, UBS Runs Risk". The Wall Street Journal.
- "Goldman Rehires Forst as Senior Strategy Executive". The New York Times. August 31, 2009.
- Grant, Peter (December 16, 2013). "Cushman & Wakefield Names Edward Forst Chief Executive". The Wall Street Journal.
- Grant, Peter (December 21, 2014). "Cushman's Deal for Midlevel Sales Dominance". The Wall Street Journal.
- Grant, Peter (May 11, 2015). "TPG-Backed DTZ to Acquire Cushman & Wakefield". The Wall Street Journal.
- Harrington, Adam (May 1, 2025). "John "Jack" Thole, renowned chemistry teacher at Chicago's Saint Ignatius College Prep, dies at 89". CBS News.
- Heckman, Jory (October 23, 2025). "Trump's pick to lead GSA vows to address 'delinquent' condition of federal buildings". Federal News Network.
- Jamison, Miles (August 4, 2025). "Edward Forst Nominated as GSA Administrator". ExecutiveGov.
- "John P. Thole". Chicago Tribune. April 20, 2025.
- Kahn, Joseph (October 21, 1998). "With Stock Issue Ahead, Goldman, Sachs Names 57 as Partners". The New York Times.
- Kassenaar, Lisa; Harper, Christine (October 20, 2008). "Goldman Sachs Paydays Suffer on Lost Leverage With Fed Scrutiny". Bloomberg News.
- Kavoussi, Bonnie; Yi, Esther (July 3, 2009). "FAS Finance Dean To Depart After Less Than A Year". The Harvard Crimson.
- King Jr., Neil (May 20, 2013). "Romney Planning to Rejoin National Dialogue". The Wall Street Journal.
- Konkel, Frank (December 24, 2025). "Ed Forst sworn in as GSA administrator". NextGov.
- Kouwe, Zachery (February 12, 2010). "Goldman Picks New Leader in Asset Management Unit". The New York Times.
- Landler, Mark; Andrews, Edmund (October 3, 2008). "For Treasury Dept., Now Comes Hard Part of Bailout". The New York Times.
- Marks, Clifford (June 18, 2008). "Harvard Appoints Goldman Sachs Official as Executive Vice President". The Harvard Crimson.
- Mollenkamp, Carrick (February 10, 2007). "Goldman Transfer Adds to Evidence Street Is Losing Ground to London". The Wall Street Journal.
- Nazzaro, Miranda (August 1, 2025). "Trump nominates former private equity executive Edward Forst as GSA administrator". FedScoop.
- Nazzaro, Miranda (December 19, 2025). "Senate confirms Edward Forst as next GSA administrator". FedScoop.
- O'Connor, Patrick; Reinhard, Beth (January 9, 2015). "Romney Tells Donors He Is Considering 2016 White House Bid". The Wall Street Journal.
- Politi, James; Guha, Krishna; Kirchgaessner, Stephanie (September 26, 2008). "Paulson taps Forst as adviser on plan". Financial Times.
- Sneed, Tierney (April 3, 2026). "Trump's DOJ tells Trump he can hold onto government docs when he leaves office, contrary to Watergate-era law". CNN.
- "Susan K. Ryan, Edward C. Forst". The New York Times. December 5, 1993.
- Zuckerman, Gregory; Smith, Jennifer (September 16, 2015). "Discord Breaks Out at Carnegie Hall". The Wall Street Journal.

=== Documents ===
- "RMG Acquisition Corp. III". Securities and Exchange Commission.
