= Prologue (magazine) =

- Prologue magazine, Summer 2005 cover
- Frequency: Quarterly
- Publisher: National Archives and Records Administration (NARA)
- Founder: James Berton Rhoads
- First issue: Spring 1969
- Final issue: Winter 2017 (print)
- Country: USA
- Based in: Atlanta, Georgia
- Language: English
- Website: www.archives.gov/publications/prologue Prologue
- ISSN: 0033-1031
- OCLC: 321015582

Prologue is a publication of the U.S. National Archives and Records Administration (NARA). The publication's articles are based on NARA's holdings and programs, as well as material from the regional archives and the presidential libraries across the United States.

The magazine was founded by James B. Rhoads, fifth archivist of the United States. The first issue of Prologue appeared in Spring 1969. The periodical's headquarters are in Atlanta, Georgia. The magazine ceased print publication in 2017.
