= Timeline of the Equal Rights Amendment =

Timeline for the proposed amendment to the U.S. Constitution

The Equal Rights Amendment (ERA) was first proposed in 1923 by suffragist Alice Paul as an amendment to the United States Constitution to prohibit discrimination on the basis of sex. It was passed by the House of Representatives in 1971 and the Senate in 1972. To be certified, 38 states were required to ratify it, and Congress implemented a seven-year deadline for the ratification to take place. The deadline was extended to 1982, but only 35 of the 38 states ratified it. It was then ratified by Nevada in 2017, Illinois in 2018, and Virginia in 2020.

== 20th century ==
- December 10, 1923 – Senator Charles Curtis introduces the first draft of the ERA to the United States Congress. The original text written by suffragist Alice Paul reads: "Men and women shall have equal rights throughout the United States and every place subject to its jurisdiction. Congress shall have power to enforce this article by appropriate legislation."
- October 12, 1971 – The House of Representatives passes the ERA. The vote is 354 in favor and 24 opposed.
- March 22, 1972 – The Senate passes the ERA. This version of the amendment reads: "Equality of rights under the law shall not be denied or abridged by the United States or by any State on account of sex." The vote is 84 in favor and 8 opposed. A deadline is set that it must by ratified by the required 38 states within the next seven years.
- March 22, 1972 – Hawaii ratifies the ERA.
- March 23, 1972 – Delaware and New Hampshire ratify the ERA.
- March 24, 1972 – Idaho and Iowa ratify the ERA.
- March 28, 1972 – Kansas ratifies the ERA.
- March 29, 1972 – Nebraska ratifies the ERA.
- March 30, 1972 – Texas ratifies the ERA.
- April 4, 1972 – Tennessee ratifies the ERA.
- April 5, 1972 – Alaska ratifies the ERA.
- April 14, 1972 – Rhode Island ratifies the ERA.
- April 17, 1972 – New Jersey ratifies the ERA.
- April 21, 1972 – Colorado ratifies the ERA.
- April 22, 1972 – West Virginia ratifies the ERA.
- April 26, 1972 – Wisconsin ratifies the ERA.
- May 18, 1972 – New York ratifies the ERA.
- May 22, 1972 – Michigan ratifies the ERA.
- May 26, 1972 – Maryland ratifies the ERA.
- June 21, 1972 – Massachusetts ratifies the ERA.
- June 27, 1972 – Kentucky ratifies the ERA.
- September 26, 1972 – Pennsylvania ratifies the ERA.
- November 13, 1972 – California ratifies the ERA.
- January 26, 1973 – Wyoming ratifies the ERA.
- February 5, 1973 – South Dakota ratifies the ERA.
- February 8, 1973 – Minnesota and Oregon ratify the ERA.
- February 28, 1973 – New Mexico ratifies the ERA.
- March 1, 1973 – Vermont ratifies the ERA.
- March 15, 1973 – Connecticut ratifies the ERA.
- March 22, 1973 – Washington ratifies the ERA.
- January 18, 1974 – Maine ratifies the ERA.
- January 25, 1974 – Montana ratifies the ERA.
- February 4, 1974 – Ohio ratifies the ERA.
- February 3, 1975 – North Dakota ratifies the ERA.
- January 24, 1977 – Indiana ratifies the ERA.
- October 6, 1978 – The Senate passes an extension of the seven year deadline, setting it back to June 30, 1982.
- June 30, 1982 – The modified deadline for the ERA ends with only 35 of the required 38 states having ratified.

== 21st century ==
- March 21, 2017 – Nevada ratifies the ERA.
- May 30, 2018 – Illinois ratifies the ERA.
- January 8, 2020 – The Office of Legal Counsel determines that the ERA has expired and is not eligible for ratification.
- January 27, 2020 – Virginia ratifies the ERA, fulfilling the requirement that 38 states ratify the amendment.
- February 10, 2020 – Supreme Court Justice Ruth Bader Ginsburg encourages supporters of the ERA to start with a new ratification process instead of continuing to support the previous version.
- February 13, 2020 – The House of Representatives passes a measure to remove the ratification deadline for the ERA. The vote is 232 in favor and 183 opposed.
- February 28, 2023 – A case to compel the certification of the ERA is dismissed by a federal appeals court.
- 2022 – Incoming national archivist Colleen Joy Shogan says during her confirmation that she will not affirm the ERA, instead leaving this to the decision of Congress or the courts.
- 2023 – Senator Kirsten Gillibrand and Representative Cori Bush introduce a joint resolution affirming the ratification of the ERA.
- 2023 – A resolution is introduced to remove the deadline for ratification, but it does not pass.
- December 17, 2024 – The national archivist and deputy national archivist issue a joint statement that the ERA cannot be certified.
- January 17, 2025 – President Joe Biden makes a statement that the ERA has met the requirements for ratification.
