= James E. O'Neill =

James O'Neill
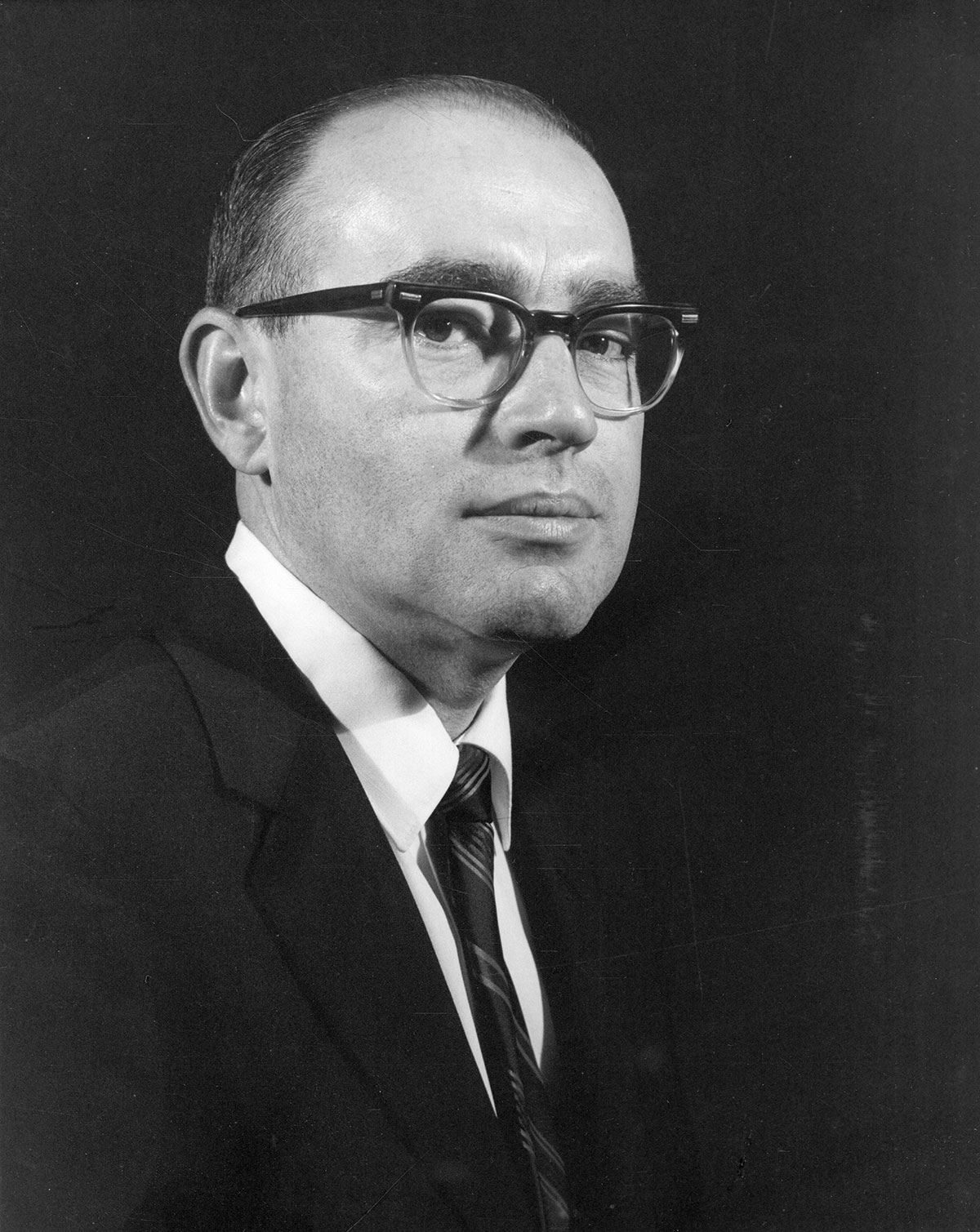

Acting Archivist of the United States
- In office September 1, 1979 – July 23, 1980
- President: Jimmy Carter
- Preceded by: James B. Rhoads
- Succeeded by: Robert M. Warner

Personal details
- Born: February 2, 1929 Renovo, Pennsylvania
- Died: March 6, 1987 (aged 58)
- Spouse: Dorothy Collings O'Neill
- Children: 5
- Education: University of Detroit; University of Chicago

James Edward O'Neill (February 2, 1929 – March 6, 1987) was an American archivist who served as acting Archivist of the United States from September 1, 1979, through July 23, 1980. He was born in Renovo, Pennsylvania. He was also head of the US Presidential Libraries system. He died of a heart attack on March 6, 1987.

Government offices
Preceded by James B. Rhoads	Archivist of the United States; 1979–1980	Succeeded by Robert M. Warner
