= Robert Digges Wimberly Connor =

American historian (1878–1950)

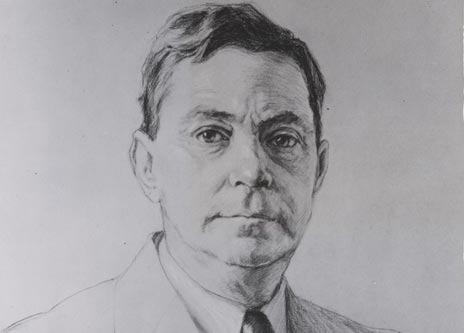

1st Archivist of the United States
- In office October 10, 1934 – September 15, 1941
- President: Franklin D. Roosevelt
- Preceded by: Office established
- Succeeded by: Solon J. Buck

Personal details
- Born: September 26, 1878 Wilson, North Carolina, U.S.
- Died: February 25, 1950 (aged 71)
- Spouse: Sadie Hanes (m. 1902)
- Parent: Henry G. Connor (father)
- Education: University of North Carolina at Chapel Hill
- Occupation: Historian

Robert Digges Wimberly Connor (September 26, 1878 – February 25, 1950) was an American historian who served as the first state archivist of North Carolina from 1907 to 1921, and later as the first archivist of the United States from 1934 to 1941.

== Early life ==
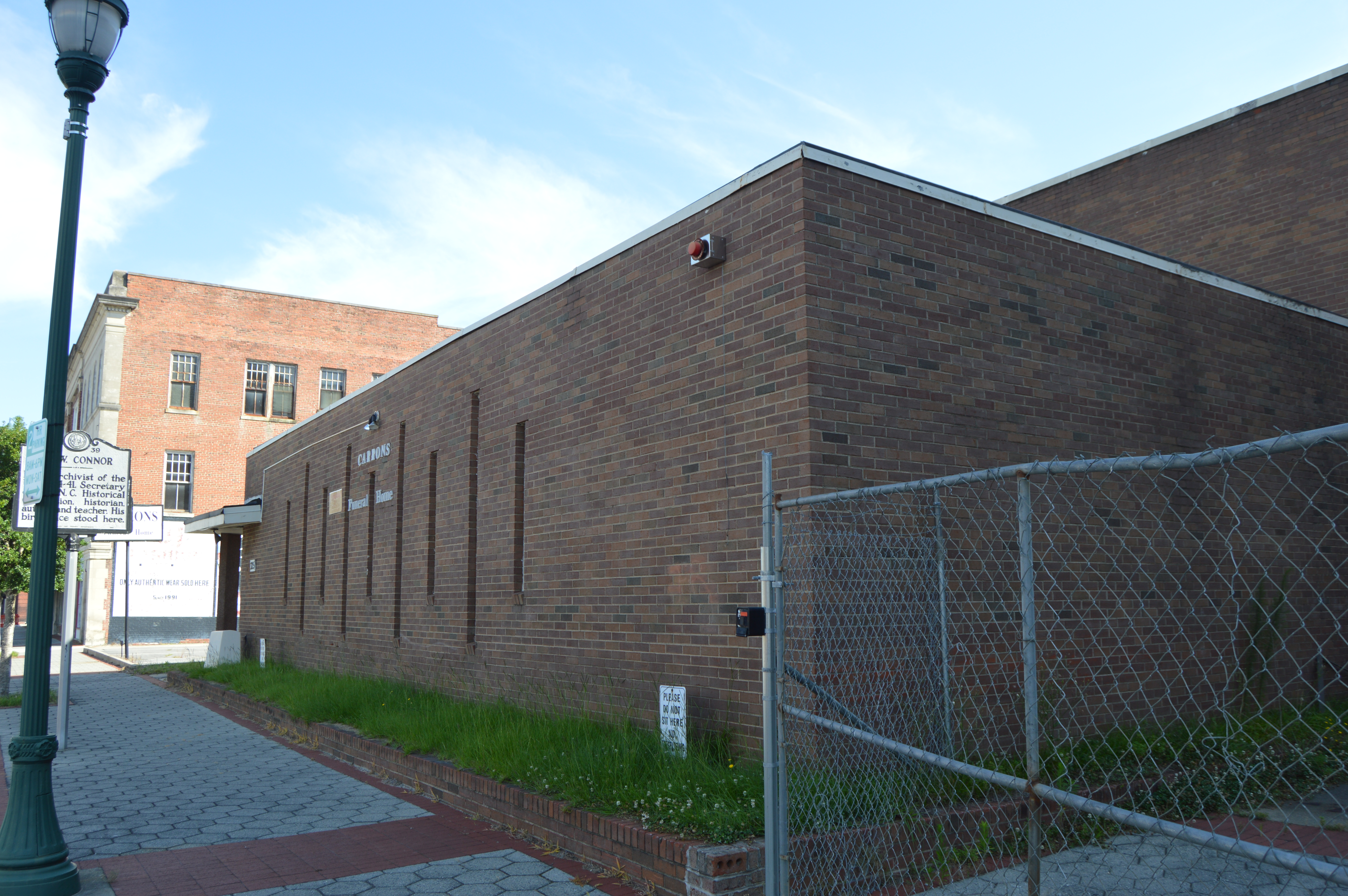
Site of Connor's birthplace, now a funeral home

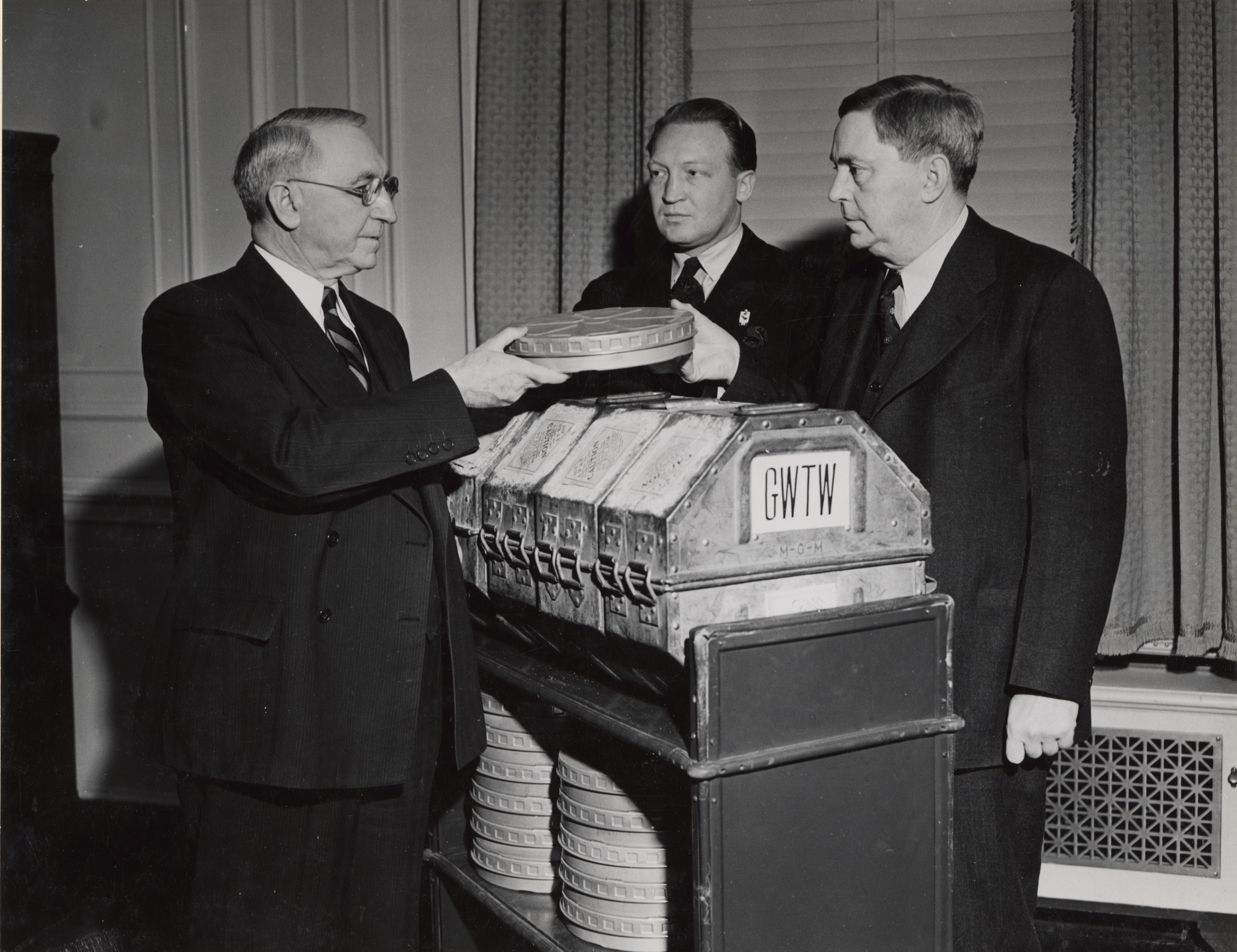
Connor (center), as archivist of the United States, receiving the film Gone with the Wind from Senator Walter F. George of Georgia (left) and Loew's Eastern Division Manager Carter Barron (right), 1941

Connor was born to Henry G. Connor and Kate Whitfield Connor on September 26, 1878, in Wilson, North Carolina.

He graduated from the University of North Carolina at Chapel Hill in 1899.

== Career ==
In his role as the inaugural secretary of the North Carolina Historical Commission, Connor lobbied the North Carolina General Assembly for a building and funding for what became the State Archives of North Carolina. He served as the first state archivist of North Carolina from 1907 to 1921.

Connor left the North Carolina Historical Commission to become the Kenan Professor of History and Government at the University of North Carolina at Chapel Hill. He held that position until 1934.

In 1934 President Franklin D. Roosevelt appointed him to head the National Archives.

Connor served as the third president of the Society of American Archivists between 1941 and 1943.

== Personal life and death ==
He married Sadie Hanes of Mocksville, North Carolina on December 23, 1902.

He died on February 25, 1950.

Government offices
Preceded by --	Archivist of the United States; 1934–1941	Succeeded by Solon J. Buck
