= Trudy Huskamp Peterson =

American archivist (born 1945)

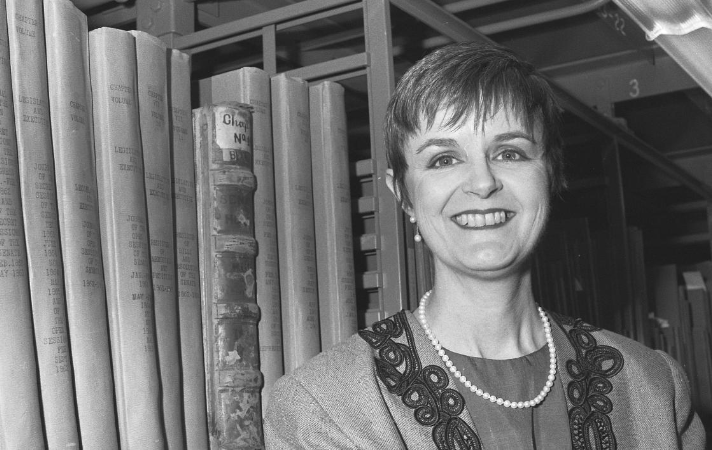
- Trudy Huskamp Peterson, photograph taken 3/9/1988

Acting Archivist of the United States
- In office March 25, 1993 – May 29, 1995
- President: Bill Clinton
- Preceded by: Don W. Wilson
- Succeeded by: John W. Carlin

Personal details
- Born: January 25, 1945 (age 80) Palo Alto County, Iowa
- Education: Iowa State University; University of Iowa

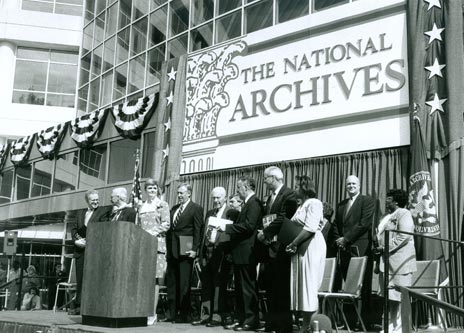
Acting Archivist Trudy Peterson (on stage, third from left) presiding over dedication of NARA's building in College Park, Maryland on May 12, 1994.

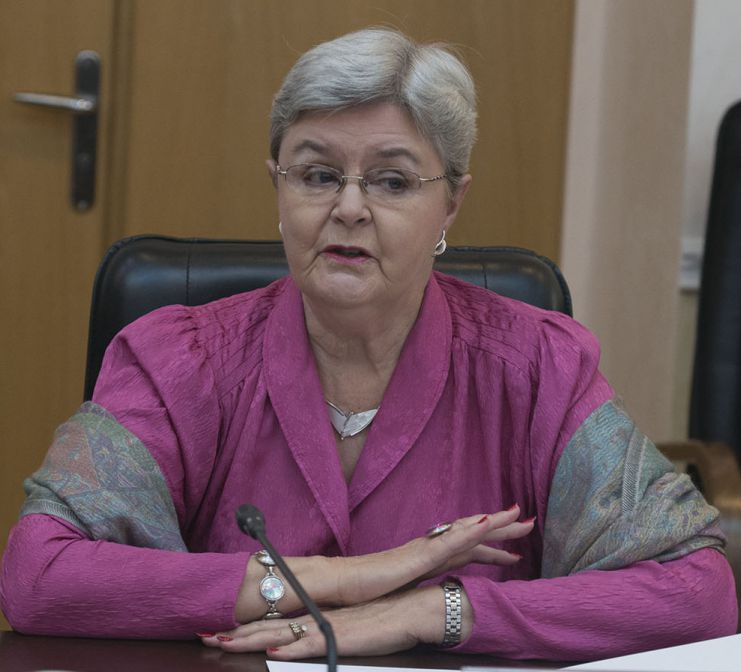
October 15, 2015.

Trudy Huskamp Peterson (born January 25, 1945) is the first woman to hold the position of Archivist of the United States. She was the Acting Archivist of the United States from March 25, 1993 to May 29, 1995.

== Education ==
Peterson earned her B.S. in English and History from Iowa State University in 1967, an M.A. in U.S. History from the University of Iowa in 1972 and a Ph.D. in U.S. History from the University of Iowa in 1975. She gained certification from the Academy of Certified Archivists in 1989.

== Career ==
In 1967, Peterson joined the National Archives, becoming assistant archivist in 1987 and Acting Archivist in 1993. She has started her own archival consulting company where she has been a consulting archivist since 2002. Some of her clients include: the Truth Commissions in South Africa and Honduras, the Special Court for Sierra Leone, the Nuclear Claims Tribunal of the Republic of the Marshall Islands, and training Guatemalans working with the newly discovered Police Archives on Standard Archival Techniques. Peterson also worked with wrestler Scott Hall to archive the materials of the NWA Central States in an effort to document the cumulative effects of concussions sustained in cage matches.

Actively involved in the many archival organizations, Peterson served a term as Society of American Archivists President, 1990–1991; on its council, 1984–1987; and on the editorial board of The American Archivist, 1978–1981. Additionally, she was the founding executive director of the Blinken Open Society Archives in Budapest, Hungary. She served as the director of archives and records management for the United Nations, and the high commissioner for refugees in Geneva, Switzerland. She was also vice-president of the International Council on Archives, 1993–1995, and vice-chair of its Commission on Program Support, 1996–2000.

=== Archivist of the United States ===
Shortly before Trudy Huskamp Peterson's tenure as Archivist of the United States, the agency was accused of mismanagement and neglect as far as the records they maintained. Just three months into her tenure, the agency lost a ruling which stated that they "failed to preserve and protect computer tapes made during the Reagan and Bush administrations. As a result of this, Peterson addressed the concerns in several different ways. She was able to implement a strategic management plan to address the declassification policy of Federal Records, as well as to plan for future needs regarding space. Peterson also helped to streamline the work force, and implemented open forum discussions where employees could address their concerns with her directly.

== Awards ==
In 2019, Trudy Huskamp Peterson was the recipient of the Emmett Leahy Award for her "sustained international leadership over the past several decades."

== Bibliography ==
- "The Universal Declaration of Human Rights: An Archival Commentary." 2018
- Temporary Courts, Permanent Records, Woodrow Wilson International Center for Scholars website, 2008
- Special Report 170: Temporary Courts, Permanent Records, United States Institute of Peace, 2006
- Final Acts: A Guide to Preserving the Records of Truth Commissions. Washington, D.C.: Woodrow Wilson Center Press; Baltimore: Johns Hopkins University Press, 2005.
- Peterson, Trudy Huskamp; Peterson, Gary M. Archives and Manuscripts: Law, Society of American Archivists, 1985
- Basic Archival Workshop Exercises, Society of American Archivists, 1982
- editor. Farmers, Bureaucrats, and Middlemen: Historical Perspectives on American Agriculture, Howard University Press, 1980
- Agricultural Exports, Farm Income, and the Eisenhower Administration, University of Nebraska Press, 1979
- “News from the ICA Human Rights Working Group,” International Council on Archives website, monthly, 2009-
- “Archives, Agency and the State,” in Berber Bevernage and Nico Wouters, eds., State-Sponsored History Handbook, Palgrave Press (forthcoming)
- “Archival Advocacy: Profession, people, power, and small “p” politics,” in Christine Weideman and Mary Caldera, eds., Festschrift for Mark Greene (forthcoming)
- “The ‘I’ in Government ArchIves,” Asian Education and Development Studies (forthcoming)
- “Principle 14,” “Principle 15,” and “Principle 17” in Paola Gaeta, Frank Haldemann and Thomas Unger, The United Nations Principles to Combat Impunity: A Commentary (forthcoming)
- “Archives for Justice, Archives of Justice,” in James B. Gardner and Paula Hamilton, eds., The Handbook of Public History, Oxford University Press (forthcoming)
- “Managing Turbulence,” in Gabriella Ivacs, ed., Managing in an Electronic Records World (forthcoming)
- “Rule-of-Law Tools for Post-Conflict States: Archives,” United Nations High Commissioner for Human Rights series, 2015
- “No Closure without Disclosure,” in Kleion pauloisaa (Festschrift for Jussi Nuorteva), Suomalaisen Kirjallisuuden Seura, 2014
- “Rights and Responsibilities: The Role of the Archivist,” SAP - Yearbook 2014, Stichting Archiefpublicaties, The Netherlands
- “Our Archives and Our Rights,” Revista de Girona (Spain), July–August 2014
- “The Probative Value of Archival Documents,” Swisspeace, 2014
- "Securing Police Archives,” Swisspeace, 2013
- “National Archives and the International Council on Archives: Converging and Diverging,” Atlanti, 2013
- “Searching for Support: Preserving the Records of the Nuclear Claims Tribunal,” Groniek, 2013
- “Securing Police Archives,” Swisspeace, 2013
- “Archives Research as Unfinished Business,” Using History to Inform Development Policy, World Bank, 2013
- “Human Rights, Documents, and Countries in Transition,” IFYE News, September 2011
- “Principles of Access to Archives: A Status Report,” Flash 22, July 2011
- “Human Rights, Human Wrongs, and Archives,” III International Seminar on Archives from Andalusia: Archives and Human Rights, 2011
- “El valor probatorio del document de archive en los procesos judiciales,” Tabula: Estudios archivisticos de Castilla y Leon 14, 2011
- “Um Projeto Sobre Acesso,” Acervo: Revista do Arquivo Nacional, Brazil 24/1, 2011
- “Archives against Amnesia,” Politorbis 50, Federal Department of Foreign Affairs, Switzerland, 3/2010
- “To Have and To Have Not: Archives as Information, Archives as Symbol,” Archives without Borders, Archiefkunde 12, 2012
- Book review, “Archives and Justice: A South African Perspective,” Journal of Archival Organizations 6, Nos. 1–2, 2008; in Spanish in Tabula: Estudios archivisticos de Castilla y Leon 14, 2011
- “Working Group on Access,” Flash 21, December 2010
- “Attitudes and Access in the United States of America,” Japan-US Friendship Association seminar, Society of American Archivists website, 2007
- “Application of ISAD(G) for Human Rights Archives,” International Council on Archives website, 2005, update 2012
- “Archives in Service to the State: The Law of War and Records Seizure” in Margaret Procter, et al., eds., Political Pressure and the Archival Record, Society of American Archivists, 2006; published 2008 in Lligall, the journal of the Catalan Society of Archivists
- “Access to Records of Intergovernmental Organizations,” Woodrow Wilson International Center for Scholars website, 2005
- “Truth and the Records of Truth Commissions,” Studien und Quellen 30, 2004
- “Which Drawer Do You Use?” in Bruce Ambacher, ed., Thirty Years of Electronic Records, Lanham, Maryland: Scarecrow Press, 2003
- “The Nasty Truth about Nationalism and National Archives,” Proceedings of the 5th General Conference of EASTICA, 2001
- “Democracy, Culture, and Archives of the European Union,” Access to Official Documents and Archives, Riksarkiviet, Sweden, 2001
- “Macro Archives, Micro States,” Archivaria, Fall 2000
- “Archival Parasailing,” in Leszek Pudlowski and Ivan Szekely, eds., Open Society Archives, 1999
- “Making Money, Spending Money: Multinationals and their Records,” in Francisco Daelemans, ed., Miscellanea in honorem Caroli Kecskemeti, 1998
- “Access Matters: Four Documents,” National Archives of the United States website publication 1998
- “The Internet and the Archives,” Atlanti 8, 1998
- “Preservation, Access, and the Multinationals,” IASSIST Quarterly Summer 1997
- “Archives of UNESCO Europe: A Comparative View,” UNESCO World Information Report, 1997
- “Putting Records First to Make Them Last,” Choosing to Preserve, European Commission on Preservation and Access, 1997
- “Reflections on the Record,” Government Information Quarterly, Winter 1996
- “Using the Finding Aids to Archives and Manuscript Collections,” in Charles A. D’Aniello, ed., Teaching Bibliographic Skills in History: A Sourcebook for Historians and Librarians, Greenwood Press, 1993
- “Privacy and Freedom of Information,” Janus, Issue 2, 1992
- “Reading, 'Riting, and 'Rithmetic: Speculations on Change in Research Processes,” American Archivist, Summer 1992
- "Dangerous Archives,” Fourteenth Polar Libraries Colloquy, Proceedings, Summer 1992
- “Archival Bestiary,” American Archivist, Spring 1991
- “Rural Life and the Privacy of Political Association,” Agricultural History, Number 3, 1990
- “Federal Records, Privacy, and Public Officials in the United States,” Janus, Issue 2, 1987
- “The National Archives and the Archival Theorist Revisited, 1954-1984,” American Archivist, Spring 1986 (winner, Fellows' Posner Prize, 1987)
- “The National Archives: Substance and Shadows, 1965-1980,” in Timothy Walch, ed., Guardian of Heritage: Essays on the History of the National Archives. National Archives, National Archives Trust Fund Board, 1985
- “Archival Principles and the Records of the New Technology,” American Archivist, Fall 1984.
- “Archives,” in R. Alton Lee, ed., Encyclopedia U.S.A., Academic International Press, 1983
- “Counting and Accounting: Speculation on Change in Recordkeeping Practices,” American Archivist, Spring 1982
- “A Review of Two NARS Networks,” The Midwestern Archivist, Vol. VI, No. 2, 1982
- “Documents in Time: The Archives of the United States and the National Archives and Records Service,” Government Publications Review, Vol. 8A, No. 4, 1981
- “Education and Research in Archival Administration,” in Joel Lee, ed., Encyclopedia of Library Science, 1980, reprinted 1986
- “After Five Years: As Assessment of the Amended U.S. Freedom of Information Act,” American Archivist, Spring 1980; reprinted in Library Lit. 11--The Best of 1980, Scarecrow Press, 1981
- “Sales, Surpluses, and the Soviets: A Study in Political Economy,” in Fraenkel, et al., ed., The Role of U.S. Agriculture in Foreign Policy, Praeger, 1979
- “Hedge Against Hunger: Food Reserves and the USDA,” in Koerselman and Dull, ed., Food and Social Policy, Iowa State University Press, 1978
- “Using the Freedom of Information Act to Acquire Archival Material,” Law Library Journal, Fall 1979
- "The Gift and the Deed," The American Archivist 42 (1979): 61–6.
- “The Iowa Historical Records Survey, 1936-42,” American Archivist, April 1974 (Gondos Award, Society of American Archivists)

Government offices
Preceded by Don W. Wilson	Archivist of the United States; 1993–1995	Succeeded by John W. Carlin
