= Don W. Wilson =

American historian

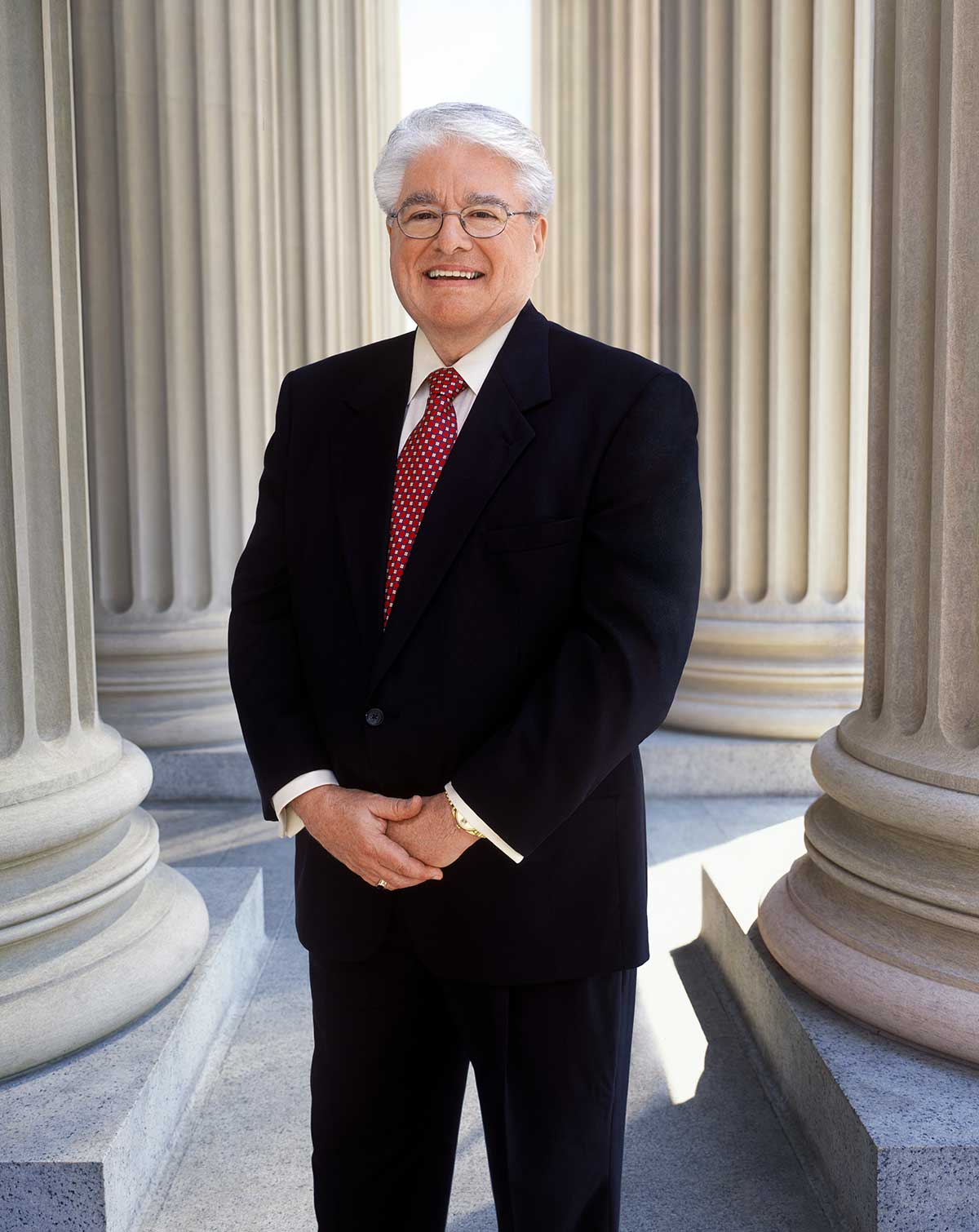

7th Archivist of the United States
- In office December 4, 1987 – March 24, 1993
- President: Ronald Reagan; George H. W. Bush; Bill Clinton
- Preceded by: Frank G. Burke (acting)
- Succeeded by: Trudy Huskamp Peterson (acting)

Personal details
- Born: December 17, 1942 Clay Center, Kansas
- Died: August 2026 (aged 83)
- Education: Washburn University; University of Cincinnati
- Occupation: historian, archivist

Don W. Wilson (December 17, 1942 – August 2026) served as the 7th Archivist of the United States from December 4, 1987, to March 24, 1993. Following his tenure, he became the executive director of the George Bush Center at Texas A&M University.

One day before the end of George H. W. Bush's term, Wilson signed an unusual agreement with Bush, granting him "exclusive legal control of all Presidential information" from more than 4,000 computer tapes covering the Reagan and Bush administrations. The archival data could have been important to historians and investigators to understand domestic and foreign policy initiatives during the Reagan and Bush years, as well as scandals and controversies. The hiring of Wilson to the George Bush Center at Texas A&M University shortly afterwards raised concerns of conflict of interest.

== Biography ==
Wilson earned a bachelor's degree from Washburn University in Topeka, Kansas, and attended the University of Cincinnati, which awarded Wilson both an M.A. and Ph.D. in history. He served on the history faculties at the University of Michigan and Washburn University and worked with the Center for Presidential Studies at Texas A&M University as a research professor. Wilson also worked as archivist at the Kansas State Historical Society and as associate director at the State Historical Society of Wisconsin.

Wilson was a National Defense Fellow from 1964 to 1967 while at the University of Cincinnati, and received an honorary doctorate from the University of Cincinnati in 1988.

Wilson has extensive experience with presidential libraries, working as deputy director of the Dwight D. Eisenhower Presidential Library, as the first director of the Gerald Ford Presidential Library, in Ann Arbor, Michigan, in 1981, as the executive director of the George Bush Presidential Library and George Bush Presidential Library Foundation (April 1993 – 1998) at Texas A&M University. The latter position was a source of controversy when it was revealed that Wilson made an agreement with Bush that gave the president control over his records that was ultimately judged "arbitrary, capricious, an abuse of discretion and contrary to law."

=== National Archives ===
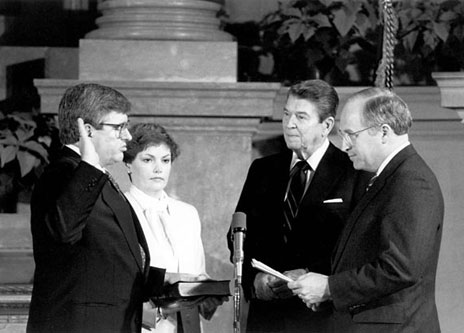
Dick Cheney administers the oath of office to Don Wilson as Mrs. Wilson and President Ronald Reagan look on, December 4, 1987.

President Ronald Reagan swore in Wilson on December 4, 1987, with US Congressman Dick Cheney serving as the master of ceremonies.

On May 18, 1992, in his official capacity as archivist, he officially certified the ratification of the Twenty-seventh Amendment to the United States Constitution and on May 19, 1992, printed it in the Federal Register, together with the certificate of ratification. Due to the length of time between the amendment's submission and ratification (more than 202 years), doing this without congressional approval was controversial, with Speaker of the House Tom Foley and others calling for a legal challenge to the amendment's unusual ratification.

However, Wilson had acted under statutory authority granted to his office by the Congress under Title 1, section 106b of the United States Code, which states:

Whenever official notice is received at the National Archives and Records Administration that any amendment proposed to the Constitution of the United States has been adopted, according to the provisions of the Constitution, the Archivist of the United States shall forthwith cause the amendment to be published, with his certificate, specifying the States by which the same may have been adopted, and that the same has become valid, to all intents and purposes, as a part of the Constitution of the United States.

On May 20, 1992, each house of the 102nd Congress passed a version of a concurrent resolution agreeing that the amendment was validly ratified, despite the unorthodox period of more than 202 years for ratification. However, neither resolution was adopted by the entire Congress.

During his time at the National Archives and Records Administration, Wilson was a vocal advocate for the preservation of electronic records. In spite of his "advocacy" for the preservation of electronic records, late on the night of January 19, 1993 (the day before the end of George H. W. Bush's presidency), Wilson signed a controversial deal, giving President Bush exclusive legal control over 5,000 tapes from White House computers. Three weeks later, Wilson announced that he would become executive director of the Bush Presidential Library Center. Wilson was investigated for conflict of interest; the midnight deal was later declared null and void by a federal judge.

In late 1992 there was also a controversy regarding his prior choice of Lawrence Oberg as NARA Inspector General.

Don W. Wilson was honored by having his portrait placed in the grand staircase of the National Archives Building along the National Mall in Washington.

Government offices
Preceded by Frank G. Burke	Archivist of the United States; 1987–1993	Succeeded by Trudy Huskamp Peterson
