= William J. Bosanko =

Acting archivist of the United States

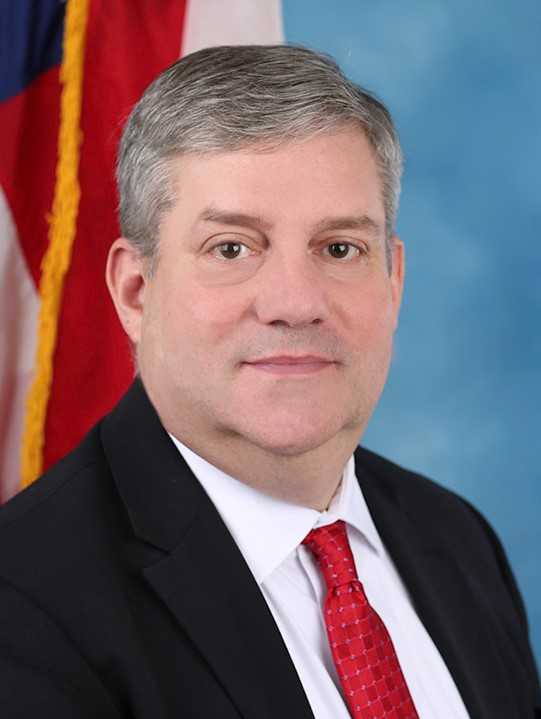

Acting Archivist of the United States
- In office February 7, 2025 – February 16, 2025
- President: Donald Trump
- Preceded by: Colleen Joy Shogan
- Succeeded by: Marco Rubio

Personal details
- Education: Susquehanna University (BA)

William Jamieson "Jay" Bosanko is an American archivist who served as the acting Archivist of the United States, the head of the National Archives and Records Administration, from February 7 to February 16, 2025.

Bosanko joined NARA in 1993 and held several senior positions during his more than three decades at the agency. He served as director of the Information Security Oversight Office, chief operating officer from 2013 to 2023, and deputy archivist of the United States from December 2023 until his retirement in 2025. In 2026, he became chief archivist of the archival processing company Historiq.

== Education ==
Bosanko holds a Bachelor of Arts in political science from Susquehanna University.

== Career ==
Bosanko started at the National Archives in 1993 as an archives technician. He joined the Information Security Oversight Office in 1998 and served as its Director from May 16, 2008 to 2011, previously serving as the acting director from January 3, 2008.

He was appointed to lead the Controlled Unclassified Information Office by Archivist of the United States Allen Weinstein following its creation.

From January 2013 to November 2023 he served as the National Archive's Chief Operating Officer.

He was appointed Deputy Archivist of the United States on December 1, 2023 and became the acting archivist on February 7, 2025 following the dismissal of Colleen Joy Shogan by Donald Trump. Bosanko announced his intention to resign the following week, on February 18, 2025. He was reportedly pushed out by Jim Byron, the recent president of the Richard Nixon Foundation. Byron reportedly told Bosanko he could either resign or be "fired the next week," according to Mother Jones. It was previously reported, by Rolling Stone, that Bosanko was among a list of individuals at the agency which Donald Trump wanted to remove from the agency, including those involved with the FBI search of Mar-a-Lago. CNN later reported that apart from Bosanko, five other senior National Archives officials "are also expected to resign." Marco Rubio replaced Bosanko as Acting Archivist of the United States on February 16, 2025.

On February 11, 2026, the archival processing company Historiq announced Jay Bosanko's appointment as their Chief Archivist.
