= Wayne C. Grover =

American archivist (1906–1970)

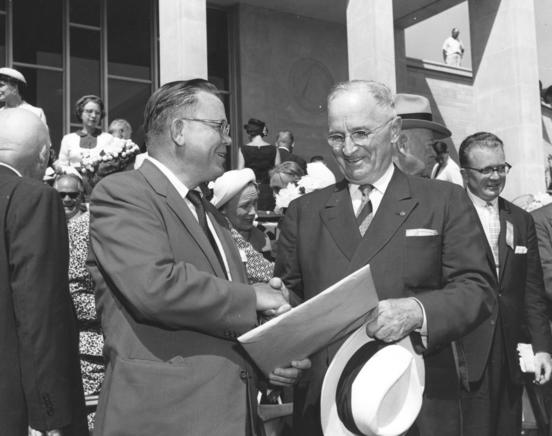
- Former President Harry S. Truman (front right) shakes hands with Wayne C. Grover (front left) who was the Archivist of the United States at the time. This picture was taken at the dedication of the Harry S. Truman Library. Former President Herbert Hoover can also been seen over Mr. Truman's left shoulder (July 6, 1957).

3rd Archivist of the United States
- In office June 2, 1948 – November 6, 1965
- President: Harry S. Truman; Dwight D. Eisenhower; John F. Kennedy; Lyndon B. Johnson
- Preceded by: Solon J. Buck
- Succeeded by: Robert H. Bahmer

Personal details
- Born: September 14, 1906 Garland, Utah, US
- Died: July 8, 1970 (aged 63) Silver Spring, Maryland, US

Wayne Clayton Grover (September 14, 1906 – June 8, 1970) served as Third Archivist of the United States.

== Career ==
Grover joined the National Archives staff in 1935. During World War II he earned the Legion of Merit for the management of Army wartime records as chief of the Records Management Branch. During his tenure as Archivist of the United States (from 1948 to 1965), the Presidential Library system was established, and he helped develop the Truman Library, the Eisenhower Presidential Center, and the Lyndon B. Johnson Library and Museum.

Also during this period, the National Archives produced the first code of ethics for the archival profession, prepared as part of its inservice training program and published under the title "The Archivist's Code"; Grover was known to be the author, although his name did not appear in the 1955 publication.

Grover was a founding member of the Society of American Archivists and served as its president from 1953 to 1954. He also served as the Western Hemisphere vice president of the International Council on Archives.

He died of cancer at his home in Silver Spring, Maryland.

Government offices
Preceded by Solon J. Buck	Archivist of the United States; 1948–1965	Succeeded by Robert H. Bahmer
