= James B. Rhoads =

American archivist

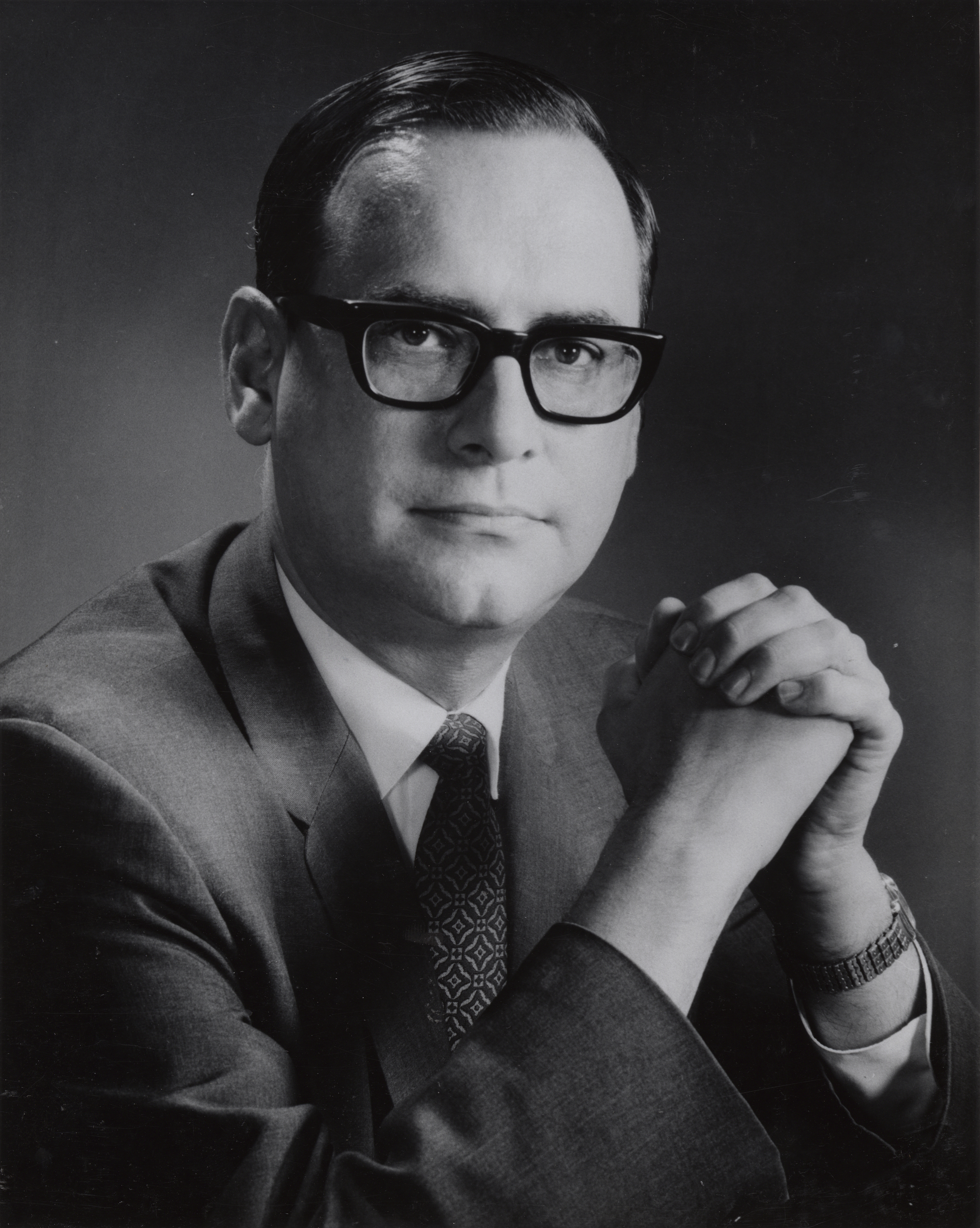
- James B. Rhoads, Fifth Archivist of the United States

5th Archivist of the United States
- In office May 2, 1968 – August 31, 1979; Acting: March 10, 1968 – May 2, 1968
- President: Lyndon B. Johnson; Richard Nixon; Gerald Ford; Jimmy Carter
- Preceded by: Robert H. Bahmer
- Succeeded by: James E. O'Neill (acting)

Personal details
- Born: September 17, 1928 Sioux City, Iowa
- Died: April 7, 2015 (aged 86) Leavenworth, Kansas
- Spouse: Sadie Angela Handy

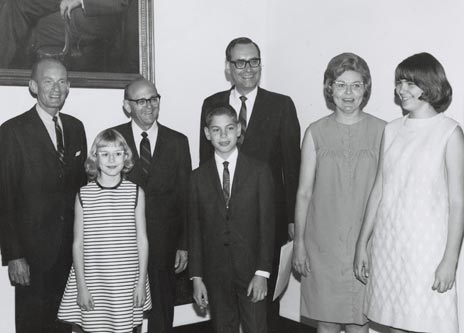
James "Bert" Rhoads (center), the fifth Archivist of the United States smiles as he stands in the middle of family and GSA leadership. From left to right: Joe Moody, Deputy Administrator of General Services Administration (GSA); Mr. Lawson Knott, Administrator, GSA; Mrs. Rhoads, and his eldest daughter, Cynthia Rhoads. His younger children Marcia and James, Jr., stand in the front. (May 2, 1968)

James Berton "Bert" Rhoads (September 17, 1928 – April 7, 2015) served as fifth Archivist of the United States. Rhoads joined the National Archives in 1952 and was named National Archivist of the United States in 1968.

He was born in Sioux City, Iowa. Rhoads received his B.A., in 1950, and M.A., in 1952, from the University of California at Berkeley. He earned his Ph.D. in History from American University in Washington, D.C., in 1965.

== Career ==
James B. Rhoads joined the National Archives in 1952 and held a number of positions before he was eventually promoted to Deputy Archivist in 1966, under Robert H. Bahmer. He became Acting Archivist on March 10, 1968; and the General Services Administrator appointed him to be the fifth Archivist of the United States on May 2, 1968. Under Rhoads, Prologue — the National Archives' quarterly publication — was founded, and the regional archives system was expanded. It was also during his tenure that Americans' rapidly developing interest in genealogical records brought a large influx of family history researchers to the National Archives for the first time.

Rhoads encouraged the engagement of his fellow archivists in the International Council on Archives. In 1972, he headed the United States delegation to the ICA-sponsored International Congress of Archivists held in Moscow. At that congress he was elected as one of two vice presidents, in which capacity he was responsible for the organization of the next congress, which was held in Washington, D.C., in 1976, concurrently with the annual meeting of the Society of American Archivists. Rhoads went on to serve as president of the ICA from 1976 to 1979.

After leaving the National Archives in 1979, Rhoads taught at Western Washington University in Bellingham, Washington, before retiring.

Rhoads was elected as a Distinguished Fellow of the Society of American Archivists in 1966; he served as the society's president from 1974 to 1975, and as a council member from 1970 to 1973. He also served as president of the Academy of Certified Archivists, from 1992 to 1994.

== Personal life ==
Rhoads was married for 59 years to Sadie Angela (Handy) Rhoads. Angela, as she was known, died 8 January 2007 from Lewy Bodies Dementia. They had three children – Cynthia, James, and Marcia. Rhoads died on April 7, 2015, in Leavenworth, Kansas.

== Works ==
- The Campaign of the Socialist Party in the Election of 1920. PhD dissertation. The American University, 1965.

Government offices
Preceded by Robert H. Bahmer	Archivist of the United States; 1968–1979	Succeeded by James E. O'Neill
