= Robert M. Warner =

American historian (1927–2007)

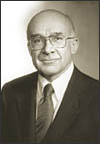
- Robert M. Warner, Sixth Archivist of the United States

6th Archivist of the United States
- In office July 24, 1980 – April 15, 1985
- President: Jimmy Carter; Ronald Reagan
- Preceded by: James E. O'Neill (acting)
- Succeeded by: Frank G. Burke (acting)

Personal details
- Born: June 28, 1927 Montrose, Colorado, U.S.
- Died: April 24, 2007 (aged 79) Ann Arbor, Michigan, U.S.
- Education: University of Michigan

Robert Mark Warner (June 28, 1927 – April 24, 2007) was an American historian who served as the Sixth Archivist of the United States at the National Archives, from July 24, 1980, to April 15, 1985.

== Early life ==
Born in Montrose, Colorado, he graduated from South High School in Denver, Colorado, in 1945. He then earned a bachelor's degree at Muskingum College in 1949 and a Ph.D. in American history in 1958 from the University of Michigan.

== Career ==
He was third director of the Michigan Historical Collections before taking the federal job.

The National Archives, founded in 1934, had been part of the General Services Administration since 1949 and was controlled by political appointees. During his term, he was elected president of the Society of American Archivists, and served in that position from 1976 to 1977. As Archivist, Warner pushed for institutional independence for the archives. Charles McC. Mathias and Thomas F. Eagleton introduced legislation that turned the Archives into the National Archives and Records Administration (NARA) in 1985.

That year, Warner returned to the University of Michigan, eventually becoming Dean of the School of Information and Library Science. The NARA Robert M. Warner Research Center is named in his honor.

== Death ==
He died in Ann Arbor, Michigan, of a heart attack on April 24, 2007, after battling cancer for a year.

Government offices
Preceded by James E. O'Neill	Archivist of the United States; 1980–1985	Succeeded by Frank G. Burke
