= Frank G. Burke =

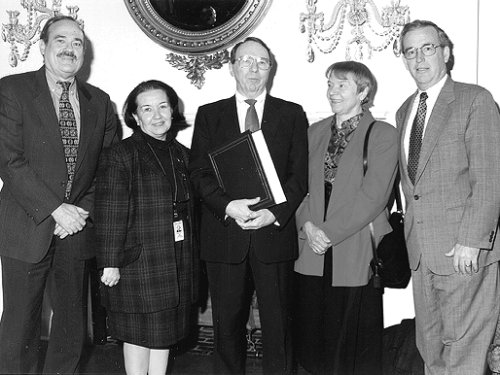
- National Historical Publications and Records Commission presented the 1998 Distinguished Service Award to Dr. Frank G. Burke, who served as its Executive Director from 1975 until 1988. Left to right, Deputy Executive Director Roger A. Bruns, Executive Director Ann C. Newhall, Frank G. Burke, Hildegard Burke, and Chairman John W. Carlin. Photo by Amy Young, NARA (November 17, 1998).

Acting Archivist of the United States
- In office April 16, 1985 – December 4, 1987
- President: Ronald Reagan
- Preceded by: Robert M. Warner
- Succeeded by: Don W. Wilson

Personal details
- Born: April 22, 1927 New York, New York
- Died: November 30, 2015 (aged 88) Annapolis, Maryland
- Spouse: Hildegard Burke
- Education: University of Chicago

Frank Gerard Burke (April 22, 1927 – November 30, 2015) served as Acting Archivist of the United States from April 16, 1985, to December 4, 1987. He received his Ph.D. from the University of Chicago.

Dr. Burke joined the staff of the National Archives in 1967 as an information retrieval specialist, after holding previous positions at the University of Chicago library and the Manuscript Division of the Library of Congress. He was one of the first National Archives employees to advocate the development of computer software for storage of archival information. He succeeded Robert M. Warner. He subsequently taught at the University of Maryland College of Information Studies (then known as the College of Library and Information Services), and served as president of the Society of American Archivists for 1991–92. He died from complications of Alzheimer's disease on November 30, 2015.

Government offices
Preceded by Robert M. Warner	Archivist of the United States; 1985–87	Succeeded by Don W. Wilson
