= Robert H. Bahmer =

American archivist (1904–1990)

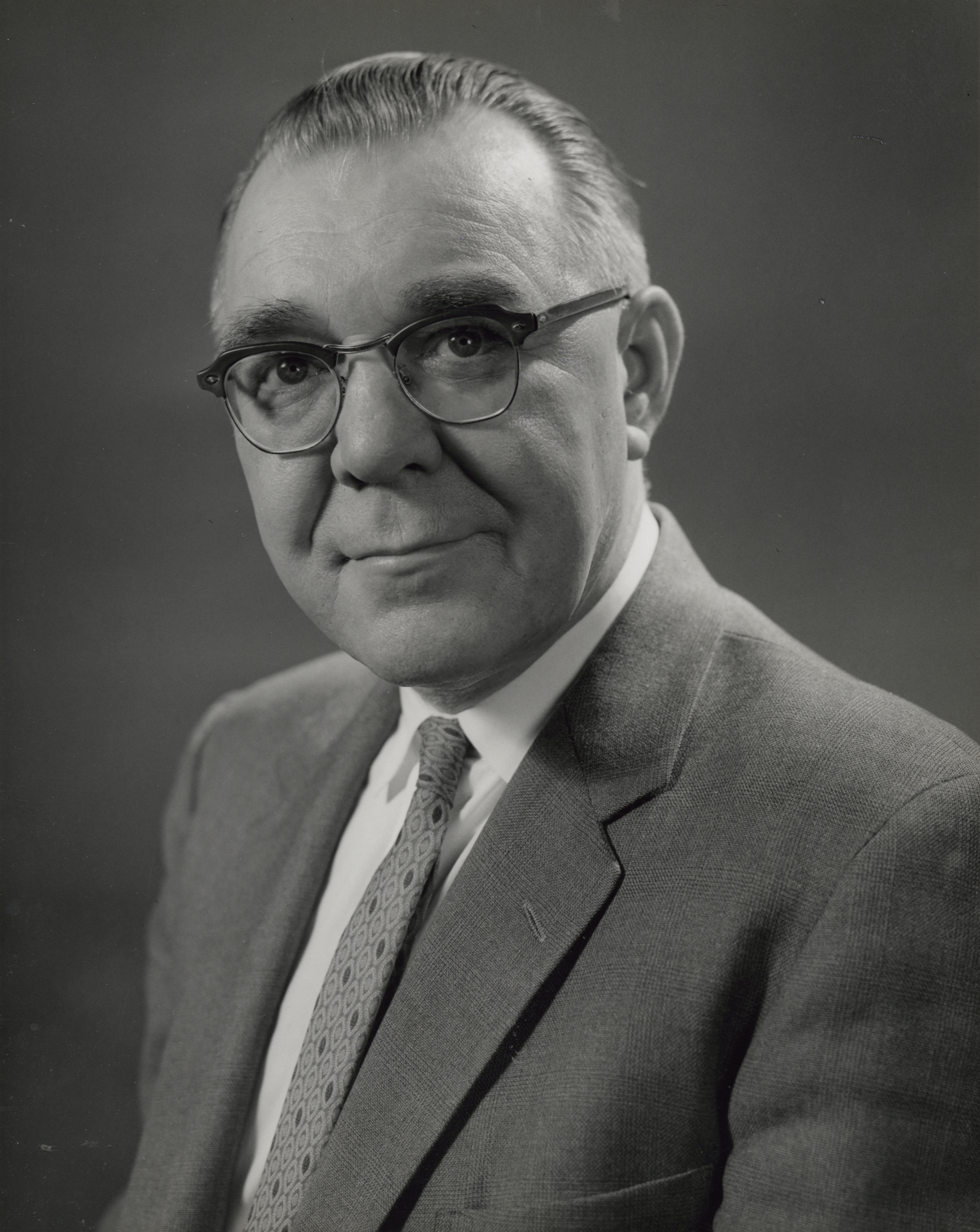
- Bahmer, c. 1965

4th Archivist of the United States
- In office November 7, 1965 – March 9, 1968
- President: Lyndon B. Johnson
- Preceded by: Wayne C. Grover
- Succeeded by: James B. Rhoads

Personal details
- Born: September 27, 1904 near Gardena, North Dakota, U.S.
- Died: March 14, 1990 (aged 85) Las Vegas, Nevada, U.S.

Robert Henry Bahmer (September 27, 1904 – March 14, 1990) served as fourth Archivist of the United States from November 7, 1965 to March 9, 1968.

== Life and career ==
Bahmer was born near Gardena, North Dakota. He earned his bachelor's degree from Valley City State University in Valley City, North Dakota, his master's from the University of Colorado at Boulder, and a doctorate from the University of Minnesota in Minneapolis-Saint Paul.

Bahmer joined the National Archives in 1936. During World War II, he served as chief of archival services for the United States Navy. Bahmer became deputy archivist in 1948, was named acting archivist in 1965, and became the official archivist on January 16, 1966, serving until his retirement two years later. He served as president in the Society of American Archivists between 1961-1962.

In 1970, Bahmer was given North Dakota's Rough Rider Award.

He died in Las Vegas, Nevada, on March 14, 1990.

Government offices
Preceded by Wayne C. Grover	Archivist of the United States; 1965–1968	Succeeded by James B. Rhoads
