= Colleen Joy Shogan =

American author and academic

Colleen Shogan
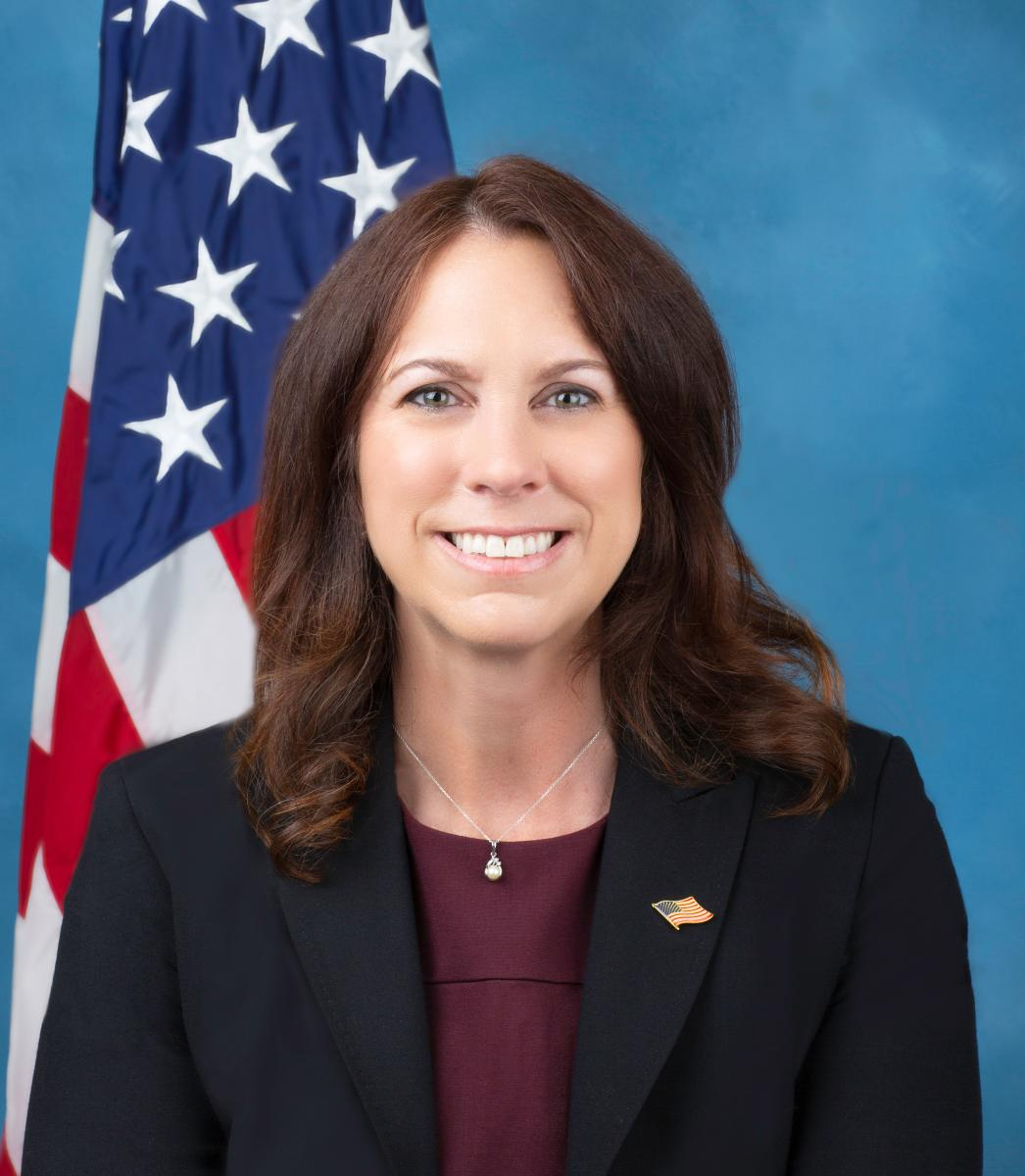
- Official portrait, 2023

11th Archivist of the United States
- In office May 17, 2023 – February 7, 2025
- President: Joe Biden; Donald Trump
- Preceded by: Debra Steidel Wall (acting)
- Succeeded by: William J. Bosanko (acting)

Personal details
- Born: Greater Pittsburgh, Pennsylvania, U.S.
- Education: Boston College (BA); Yale University (PhD)

Colleen Joy Shogan is an American author and academic, and former government official who served as the 11th Archivist of the United States from May 17, 2023, until her dismissal on February 7, 2025. She was the first woman confirmed to serve as Archivist of the United States. Before her appointment, Shogan spent more than a decade in senior leadership roles at the Library of Congress and served as director of the David M. Rubenstein Center for White House History at the White House Historical Association. Following her departure from the National Archives, she became CEO of In Pursuit, a national civics initiative.

== Early life and education ==
Born and raised in Greater Pittsburgh, Shogan was encouraged to read mysteries by her late mother, Patricia, and started with books from the Nancy Drew and Hardy Boys series. Shogan graduated from Norwin High School.

She was a first-generation college student in her family and earned a Bachelor of Arts degree in political science from Boston College and a Doctor of Philosophy degree in American politics from Yale University, where she was a National Science Foundation graduate fellow.

== Career ==
After earning her doctorate, Shogan worked as an assistant professor of government and politics at George Mason University from 2002 to 2006, and also taught at the University of Pennsylvania.

Her academic work focused on American politics and the presidency, including her book Moral Rhetoric of American Presidents, a book on the rhetorical presidency. The book was published by Texas A&M University Press in 2006. Using both quantitative methods and qualitative case studies, the book argues that presidents employ moral and religious rhetoric as a strategic political tool to enhance constitutional authority, examining nine presidents from Washington to Carter.

=== Congressional and Library of Congress work ===
Shogan worked in the United States Senate before joining the Library of Congress. At the Library of Congress, she held senior positions including Assistant Deputy Librarian for Collections and Services and Deputy Director of the Congressional Research Service. She also served as Deputy Director of National and International Outreach at the Library. Shogan worked as the vice chair of the Women's Suffrage Centennial Commission and taught as an adjunct professor in the government department at Georgetown University, where she also moderated seminars for the Aspen Institute.

In 2005, Shogan came to Capitol Hill through the American Political Science Association Congressional Fellowship Program, serving as the William E. Steiger Fellow. She remained on the legislative staff of the United States Senate through 2008.

Shogan joined the Library of Congress in 2008 as a section research manager in the Government and Finance Division of the Congressional Research Service. She advanced to assistant director of the division before being appointed Deputy Director of the Congressional Research Service in 2012. In 2015 she became acting Deputy Director of National and International Outreach, and was formally appointed to that position in 2016. She later served as Assistant Deputy Librarian for Collections and Services, completing more than twelve years in senior leadership roles at the Library.

=== White House Historical Association ===
Colleen Shogan with More Perfect's John Bridgeland and Cecilia Munoz at the University of Kansas's Dole Institute of Politics on September 16, 2026.

In 2020, Shogan joined the White House Historical Association as senior vice president and director of the David M. Rubenstein Center for White House History. In that position, she was involved in historical research, educational programming, public discussions, and programs concerning the presidency and the history of the White House.

She subsequently published peer-reviewed articles in Perspectives on Politics, Polity, Studies in American Political Development, Presidential Studies Quarterly, Rhetoric & Public Affairs, Women & Politics, and other journals.

=== Nomination as Archivist of the United States ===
On August 13, 2022, President Joe Biden nominated Shogan to be 11th archivist of the United States.

The U.S. Senate Homeland Security and Government Affairs Committee held two hearings to consider Shogan's nomination. The first hearing was held on September 21, 2022, and the panel were deadlocked on her nomination by a 7–7 party-line vote and did not advance Shogan's nomination. The second hearing was held February 28, 2023. On March 15, 2023, the committee advanced Shogan's nomination by an 8–4 vote.

During the hearings, Shogan stated that she would not publish the Equal Rights Amendment as part of the United States Constitution, stating that the job of the archivist is to publish constitutional amendments following proper ratification, not to decide when an amendment is published, in line with a Department of Justice Office of Legal Counsel memo on the subject in January 2020. Shogan's views were criticized by the ERA Coalition. Shogan also pledged to reduce the backlog of "over 300,000 veterans' records requests", calling it the "most important discrete problem" facing her, and said she would be looking for ways to declassify older historical records. She further promised transparency on records related to the FBI search of Mar-a-Lago, committed to working with U.S. senator Jon Ossoff on Civil Rights Cold Cases, stated that she would "welcome all Americans to the National Archives" if confirmed, and said she would serve in a "nonpartisan, apolitical capacity". In her opening statement at the September 2022 hearing, she also pledged to find "creative ways" to make the National Archives and Records Administration more efficient, build upon existing public-private partnerships, and engage underrepresented groups in "meaningful ways".

On May 4, 2023, the United States Senate invoked cloture on Shogan's nomination by a 53–44 vote. On May 10, 2023, Shogan was confirmed as the 11th archivist of the United States by a 52–45 vote, with her term beginning the following week.

Shogan is the first woman appointed as Archivist of the United States.

=== Archivist of the United States (2023–2025) ===
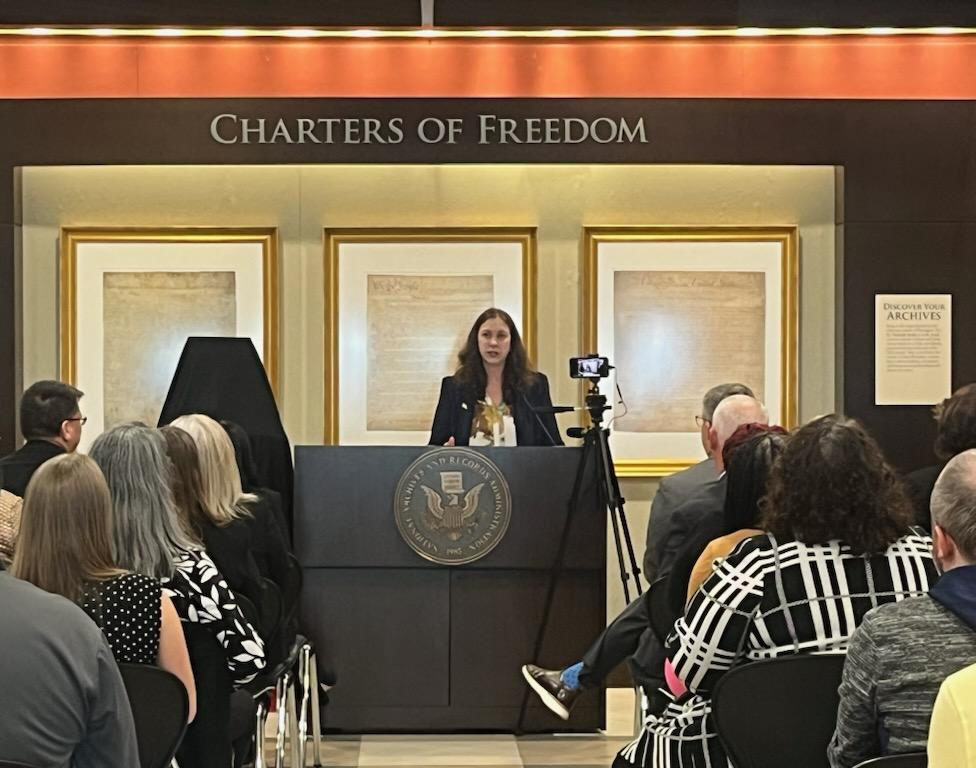
Archivist of the United States Dr. Colleen Shogan speaks at the National Personnel Records Center Backlog Elimination Ceremony.

Shogan was sworn in and began work on May 17, 2023, with her first briefing focused on addressing the "backlog of veterans’ records" and speaking with National Personnel Records Center leaders.

On June 17, 2023, Shogan announced that the National Archives would place the Emancipation Proclamation on permanent display in the Rotunda of the National Archives in Washington, D.C., alongside the Declaration of Independence, the Constitution, and the Bill of Rights. On September 23, 2024, she announced that the 19th Amendment, which recognized women's constitutional right to vote, would be added to the permanent "Charters of Freedom" would also be added to the permanent Rotunda display. The additions marked the first permanent changes to the Rotunda in nearly 75 years, timed to coincide with the nation's semiquincentennial celebrations. Shogan stated that together the documents "tell a more comprehensive story of the history of all Americans and document progress in our nation's continuous growth toward a more perfect Union."

On January 24, 2024, the National Archives announced the elimination of the "pandemic-related backlog of veteran records" at the National Personnel Records Center.

On December 17, 2024, Shogan, and the Deputy Archivist, William J. Bosanko, issued a public statement refusing to publish the Equal Rights Amendment, despite push from 120 congressional Democratic representatives, like Cori Bush and Ayanna Pressley, stating that neither they, nor Joe Biden could act without congressional or legal action lifting the ratification deadline. Later, on January 17, 2025, President Biden declared that the ERA had "been ratified" and part of the U.S. Constitution, which had no legal effect on the amendment's ratification, and a senior official, quoted by the Associated Press, stated that Biden did not direct Shogan to certify the amendment.

==== Vandalism of the Constitution's protective case ====
On February 14, 2024, climate activists dumped powder onto the protective case holding the United States Constitution at the National Archives Museum in Washington, D.C., prompting the building to close to the public. Shogan condemned the vandalism of the Constitution’s protective encasement, stating that the National Archives would seek prosecution to the fullest extent of the law. On November 12, 2024, she called for a strong sentence for the perpetrators, arguing that the attack damaged a symbol of American history, disrupted public access to the founding documents, and warranted deterrence against similar acts at cultural institutions. The activists were sentenced on November 15, 2024.

==== The American Story exhibit ====
In 2024, reporting and statements from outside organizations raised concerns about changes to exhibits addressing subjects including the Holocaust and the history of race in the United States. The controversy included criticism from the Jewish Telegraphic Agency and members of Congress, including the Congressional Black Caucus, concerning what they characterized as censorship or alteration of historical exhibits. In October 2024, the Wall Street Journal reported that Shogan and senior aides had ordered changes to planned exhibits at the museum's Discovery Center, including the removal of images of Martin Luther King, Jr., Dolores Huerta, and Minnie Spotted-Wolf, images by Dorothea Lange of Japanese-American concentration camps, cut information about the negative environmental effects of coal mining and the forced removal and incarceration of Japanese-Americans. The report cited current and former employees, one of whom filed a whistleblower complaint alleging that Shogan had "abused her authority and engaged in censorship." One of her aide Ellis Brachman asserted that the story is inaccurate, claiming that "balance was missing in the early planning of some of the new galleries here, and we have had to make some difficult decisions during the planning process" and that some people did not "want to do the hard work to address the nuanced and many layered facts of American history." Brachman also told the Jewish Telegraphic Agency that "the story is not accurate."

On November 1, the Congressional Asian Pacific American Caucus, Congressional Hispanic Caucus, and Congressional Black Caucus chairs Judy Chu, Nanette Barragán, and Steven Horsford issued a statement which criticized NARA's reported actions, saying that the agency was "preemptively appeas[ing]...conservative interests" and aligning with far-right "book ban movements nationwide", and urged Shogan to restore these references and exhibits to ensure that "NARA and the National Archives Museum tell the full and most accurate story of our nation."

On October 30, 2024, Shogan issued a response to the Wall Street Journal's reporting. She restated her "commitment to leading NARA without partisanship or ideology", asserted that federal employees are not there to "promote or share our personal interpretation of the records" but are there, in her view, to "preserve, protect, and share the records with all Americans". She also called the article "misinformed" and said she "strongly disagree[d]" with it, arguing that the article was based on "anonymous complaints about that work and my leadership of the agency" and stated that NARA will remain, in her view, "thoughtful in how we engage with our past and focused on fostering understanding and dialogue", and reprinted her statement which had been sent to the Wall Street Journal.

The American Story opened on November 21, 2025, as the museum's new flagship exhibition ahead of the nation's semiquincentennial. The exhibit features nine galleries offering thematic explorations of American history across 250 years, with more than 40 original artifacts and documents including George Washington's annotated draft copy of the Constitution and the original Louisiana Purchase treaty and uses artificial intelligence to provide visitors personalized access to more than two million digitized records. The New York Times described the exhibit as immersive and noted that it opens "keyholes into different topics" rather than imposing a single narrative, mixing physical artifacts with digital displays that allow visitors to engage with curated document collections.

==== Dismissal from the National Archives ====
On January 6, 2025, President-elect Donald Trump stated in a phone interview with radio host Hugh Hewitt that he intended to replace Shogan as head of the National Archives, saying "we will have a new archivist." On February 6, ABC News reported that Marco Rubio had been the acting archivist of the United States since the inauguration of Donald Trump on January 20. Later reporting by 404 Media stated that this reporting was misunderstanding, faulty, or a "bad news source," quoting an unnamed National Archives employee, and noted that Shogan was still listed as the archivist of the United States, pointing to an all-hands meeting of National Archives on February 4, where she stated that the agency will implement the guidance of the new administration, is learning about new complex orders, and taking actions "under tight deadlines."

On February 7, 2025, Sergio Gor, White House director of presidential personnel, announced on social media that Shogan had been removed as Archivist of the United States. CNN reported that although Donald Trump wanted to replace her, she did not know she would be removed so quickly, and was reportedly surprised when informed. Shogan stated on her personal LinkedIn page that Donald Trump had fired her, asserted that "no cause or reason was cited," and noting she had "zero regrets...[and] did [her]...best...for the National Archives and the American people." The American Historical Association (AHA) and Society of American Archivists (SAA) released statements critical of Shogan's removal. The AHA's executive director, James Grossman, requested that the White House comply with federal law (U.S. Code Title 44, Chapter 21, section 2103) and inform the U.S. Congress of the reasons that Shogan was dismissed, and added that "democracy rests on the rule of law...history of the United States rests on unfettered access to the archival record."

The SAA leadership described the removal of Shogan as alarming, saying that her removal with "no stated cause does harm to our nation and its people," stated that the organization would continue to support the mission of the National Archives, noted that the organization would continue to monitor the situation at the National Archives, support the National Archives "workers and archivists across the United States" and called upon those reading the statement to contact their legislators and advocate for "the safekeeping of government archives is essential to a free and healthy democracy." The National Archives' former director of litigation, Jason R. Baron, expressed his concern of Shogan's dismissal, telling Politico that "no good reason exists for firing Dr. Shogan, as she has faithfully carried out her duties in a nonpartisan fashion...Dr. Shogan had nothing to do with...the successful return of boxes of presidential records...[from] Mar-a-Lago."

=== Post–National Archives work and writing ===
Following her removal, Shogan joined More Perfect, a nonpartisan nonprofit, as a senior advisor. She later told WTOP that the position was similar to her previous role in that she is helping "bring our nation’s history to young people and Americans all across the country" and that, in her view, "women are criticized for their leadership more than men," adding that some criticism is valid, but not everything.

She is the author of The Moral Rhetoric of American Presidents, an academic book published by Texas A&M University Press, and eight murder mystery novels, featuring Washington congressional aide Kit Marshall, with titles that include Stabbing in the Senate, Homicide in the House, and Larceny at the Library. "They're puzzles, and I like to solve puzzles", she said in 2023 about her novels.

=== In Pursuit ===
On September 17, 2025, she launched In Pursuit at a Constitution Day Symposium at American University, where she serves as CEO. In Pursuit is a nonpartisan national civics initiative of More Perfect that invites Americans to draw lessons from the American presidency and the first 250 years of the American experiment. The project commissioned essays on each president and first lady from contributors including three former presidents, three former first ladies, the Chief Justice of the United States, and seven Pulitzer Prize winners. Former President George W. Bush's essay on George Washington launched the series on Presidents' Day 2026. The essays are published weekly and distributed freely on Substack. In Pursuit has partnered with iCivics and the Bill of Rights Institute to develop curriculum materials, and aims to reach ten million Americans, including five million students.

Shogan hosts In Pursuit with Colleen Shogan, a podcast produced in partnership with PRX, in which she discusses historical and civic lessons with contributors to the project. The initiative's 2026 programming has included interviews and appearances concerning American history, presidential leadership, civic education, and the country's 250th anniversary.

In August 2026, In Pursuit announced a forthcoming PBS documentary, In Pursuit: Lessons of American Leadership, produced with Retro Report and scheduled to premiere on October 27, 2026.

== Academic and public-service activities ==
Shogan has remained active in political science and civic education following her government service. In 2024, she received the Hubert H. Humphrey Award from the American Political Science Association for notable public service by a political scientist.

She was appointed a Practitioner Senior Fellow at the Miller Center of the University of Virginia, where her areas of expertise include education, civics, governance, Congress, domestic affairs, and the American founding.

She has also served as a Senior Fellow in Civics Education at Stand Together and as an adjunct professor of government at Georgetown University.

Shogan serves on the board of directors of the United States Capitol Historical Society and on the board of National History Day. She has also served in leadership and advisory roles connected with women's suffrage history and civic education.

== Personal life ==
Shogan is married to Rob Raffety, the internal communications director for Stand Together. She is also a Senior Fellow in Civics Education at Stand Together and a member of the Jack Miller Center's advisory council.

== Bibliography ==
=== Fiction ===
The Washington Whodunit series:

Book	Year	Notes
Stabbing in the Senate	2015	ISBN 9781603813310
Homicide in the House	2016	ISBN 9781603813334
Calamity at the Continental Club	2017	ISBN 9781603813358
K Street Killing	2018	ISBN 9781603816137
Gore in the Garden	2019	ISBN 9781603817233
Larceny at the Library	2020	ISBN 9781603818353
Dead as a Duck	2021	ISBN 9781942078326
Lethal Legacies	2022	ISBN 9781684920303
