= Association for the Study of Free Institutions =

Conservative think tank on American higher education

The Association for the Study of Free Institutions (ASFI) is a conservative think tank on American higher education.

== Overview ==
Its president is Bradford P. Wilson, a professor at Princeton University and executive director of the James Madison Program in American Ideals and Institutions. Its Vice-Presidents are Judith S. Kleinfeld, a professor of psychology at the University of Alaska, Fairbanks, John R. Kayser, a professor of political science at the University of New Hampshire. Bradley C.S. Watson, a professor of political science at Saint Vincent College is also a member of the board.

It is headquartered in Omaha, Nebraska.
