= Sumner School =

Coordinates: 39.2687°N 81.5533°W

- United States

Information
- Founder: 1862
- Closed: 1955

Sumner School was a school for African Americans in Parkersburg, West Virginia. It was established in 1862 during the American Civil War. J. Rupert Jefferson led it for more than 40 years. It closed in 1955 after desegregation. The school's 1926 gymnasium is now the Sumnerite African-American History Museum and Multipurpose Center.

It was originally known as the Parkersburg Colored School. The school was renamed for abolitionist U.S. senator Charles Sumner.

Michael J. Rice wrote The Sumner 7: A History of Sumner High School.
