= Marc Spilker =

American financial executive and investor

Marc A. Spilker
- Born: June 28, 1964 (age 62)
- Education: Wharton School of the University of Pennsylvania (BS)
- Occupations: Financial executive and investor
- Spouse: Diane Isaacs Spilker

Marc A. Spilker (born June 28, 1964) is an American financial executive and investor. He is a founding member of GPS Investment Partners and executive chairman of Merchant Investment Management.

== Life and career ==
Spilker grew up on Long Island, New York, and graduated from W. C. Mepham High School in 1982. He earned a bachelor's degree in economics from the Wharton School of the University of Pennsylvania in 1986.

After graduating, Spilker joined O'Connor & Associates, a derivatives trading firm in Chicago. After several years at O'Connor, he joined Goldman Sachs, where he worked for 20 years and ultimately served as co-head of the Investment Management Division and a member of the firm's Management Committee.

Spilker joined Apollo Global Management as president in December 2010. He stepped down as president and as a member of its executive committee in March 2014 and remained a senior adviser to the firm for the remainder of that year.

In 2015, Spilker founded GPS Investment Partners with former Goldman Sachs executives Enrico Gaglioti and Scott Prince. GPS subsequently participated in the formation of Chiron Investment Management, where Spilker served as chairman. FS Investments acquired Chiron in March 2020. Spilker is a founding member of GPS Investment Partners and executive chairman of Merchant Investment Management.

== Personal life ==
Spilker is married to Diane Isaacs Spilker, a 1987 graduate of the Wharton School.

== Philanthropy ==
In 2012, the University of Pennsylvania announced that Spilker, Diane Isaacs Spilker and Marc Rowan had made lead contributions totaling $11 million to establish the Wharton Public Policy Initiative.
