= Solon J. Buck =

United States archivist and historian

Solon Justus Buck
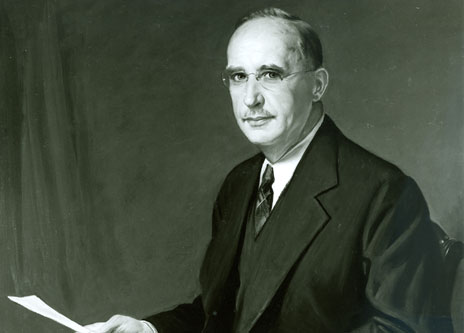
- Solon J. Buck, Second Archivist of the United States

2nd Archivist of the United States
- In office September 18, 1941 – May 31, 1948
- President: Franklin D. Roosevelt; Harry S. Truman
- Preceded by: Robert D. W. Connor
- Succeeded by: Wayne C. Grover

Personal details
- Born: August 16, 1884 Berlin, Wisconsin, US
- Died: May 25, 1962 (aged 77) Washington, D.C., US

Solon Justus Buck (August 16, 1884 – May 25, 1962) was the Second Archivist of the United States.

His academic career, never straying very far from his interest in the history of agricultural communities, started with a brief appointment to Indiana University followed by two years at the University of Illinois, which he left for the University of Minnesota in 1914, becoming also superintendent of the Minnesota State Historical Society. During his long tenure in Minnesota he fought hard for the state's history, helping organize county historical societies, founding a quarterly periodical, and moving the Historical Society from the basement of the State Capitol to its own building.

In 1931, Buck was appointed professor of history at the University of Pittsburgh, and when the U. S. National Archives were established in 1935 he was tapped to be Assistant Director, then in 1941 the second Archivist of the United States. In 1948, he joined the Library of Congress as chief of the Manuscript Division, then as Assistant Librarian until his retirement in 1954. He also served as the seventh president of the Society of American Archivists, from 1949 to 1951.

As might be expected from such a career, Buck's gifts lay in organization, with a particular talent for bibliography; he became an international authority in archival economy. His obituary in the American Historical Review says of him: "He was a perfectionist with an infinite mastery of detail. He held all his associates to his own high standards of perfection. He was merciless on incompetents, but held the respect of those who worked with him."

His works include Illinois in 1818, a sort of preamble to the Illinois Centennial History series; The Granger Movement, Travel and Description 1765‑1865 (Ph. D. thesis, Harvard, 1911), which at his death was still considered the classic treatment of the subject; The Agrarian Crusade (1919); and, with his wife Elizabeth Hawthorne Buck, The Planting of Civilization in Western Pennsylvania (1939).

He married Elizabeth Hawthorn on June 20, 1919. They had three children: Roger Conant, Mary Margaret, and Stephen Farrington.

He had been in poor health the last few years of his life, and he died soon after a fall in which he broke his hip, in Washington, D.C.

Government offices
Preceded by Robert D. W. Connor	Archivist of the United States; 1941–1948	Succeeded by Wayne C. Grover
