= Christine Harper =

American journalist

Christine Harper is a member of the editorial board of Bloomberg. She previously served as the editor of Bloomberg Markets magazine, as executive editor for global finance and investing coverage, and as the chief financial correspondent for Bloomberg News. She joined the company in 1998 in London office and moved to New York in April 2006 to cover Wall Street, focusing on Goldman Sachs and Morgan Stanley.

She previously worked for Dow Jones Newswires in Brussels and the US, and worked as a correspondent for The Philadelphia Inquirer and as a reporter for Sun Herald newspaper in Biloxi, Mississippi. She has a master's degree in journalism from Northwestern University.

== Professional recognition ==
Harper has received awards from the New York Press Club "Bonuses at Wall Street Big Five Surge to $36 Billion" and The Society of the Silurians for an article entitled "Broken Securities Industry Still Has $20 Billion to Pay Bonuses".

In 2009, she won a National Headliner Club Award for a four-part series of articles on the fallout from the Lehman Brothers bankruptcy.

In 2011, she won another Society of the Silurians award in the category for Business/Financial Reporting for an article entitled, "How the Banks Won."

== Personal life ==
Born and raised in Manhattan, Harper attended Phillips Exeter Academy. She graduated from Northwestern University in 1991, earning both a bachelor's degree and a master's degree in journalism.

== Career timeline ==
- 1991–1992: Reporter, The Sun-Herald in Biloxi, Mississippi
- 1993–1994: Correspondent, The Philadelphia Inquirer
- 1994–1996: Assistant to the Senior Vice Dean, Columbia Business School
- 1996–1997: Reporter at Dow Jones Newswires in Jersey City, New Jersey, covering the currency and Treasury bond markets
- 1997–1998: Reporter at Dow Jones Newswires in Brussels, Belgium
- 1998–2000: Reporter at Bloomberg News in London covering telecoms, media and technology companies
- 2000–2002: Reporter at Bloomberg News in London covering corporate bonds
- 2002–2006: Reporter at Bloomberg News in London covering investment banking
- 2006–2008: Reporter at Bloomberg News in New York covering Wall Street firms including Goldman Sachs and Morgan Stanley
- 2008–present: Chief Financial Correspondent at Bloomberg News in New York

== Awards and honors ==
- New York Press Club Award
- Society of the Silurians Award
- National Headliner Club Award
