= Archivist of the United States =

Chief official of the National Archives and Records Administration

- Seal of the National Archives

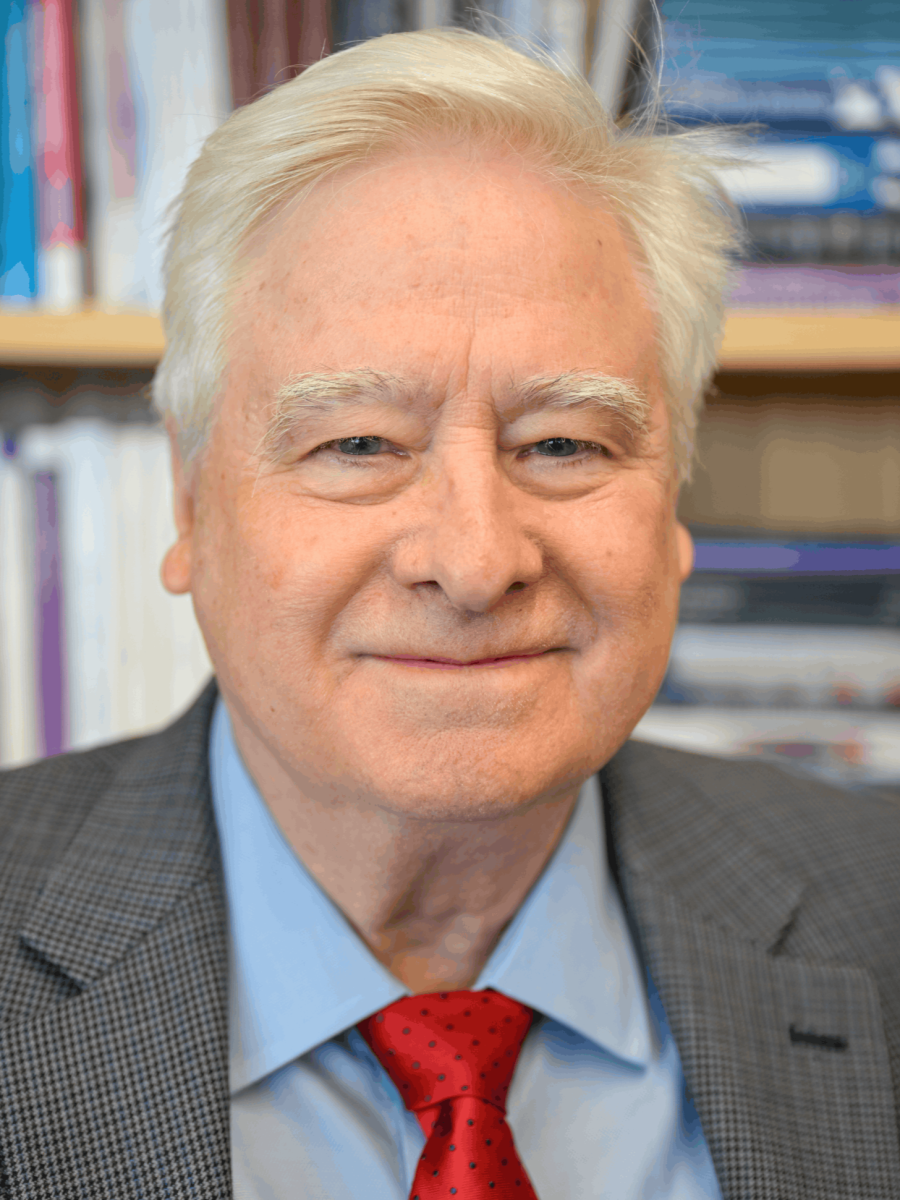
- Incumbent; Bradford Wilson since August 21, 2026
- National Archives and Records Administration
- Style: Mr./Madam. Archivist
- Status: Chief administrator
- Seat: National Archives Building, Washington, D.C.
- Appointer: The president; with Senate advice and consent
- Term length: No fixed term
- Constituting instrument: 44 U.S.C. § 2103
- Formation: June 19, 1934
- First holder: Robert Digges Wimberly Connor
- Deputy: Deputy Archivist of the United States
- Salary: Executive Schedule, level III
- Website: archives.gov

The archivist of the United States is the head and chief administrator of the National Archives and Records Administration (NARA) of the United States. The archivist is responsible for the supervision and direction of the National Archives.

The first archivist, R. D. W. Connor, began serving in 1934, when the National Archives was established as an independent federal agency by Congress. The archivists served as subordinate officials of the General Services Administration from 1949 until the National Archives and Records Administration became an independent agency again on April 1, 1985.

President Joe Biden nominated Colleen Joy Shogan for the position on August 3, 2022, with her being confirmed and sworn in by the Senate in May 2023. She was the first woman to hold the position permanently. On January 6, 2025, President-elect Donald Trump stated in a phone interview with Hugh Hewitt that he intended to replace Shogan as head of the National Archives and Records Administration and on February 7, 2025, it was reported that Shogan had been fired as the national archivist. Later President Trump nominated Bradford P. Wilson for the position on March 2, 2026.

== Background and role ==
The archivist is appointed by the president with the advice and consent of the Senate and is responsible for safeguarding and making available for study all the permanently valuable records of the federal government, including the original Declaration of Independence, Constitution and Bill of Rights, which are displayed in the Archives' main building in Washington, D.C.

Under Pub. L. 98–497, the archivist also must maintain custody of state ratifications of amendments to the Constitution. It is the archivist's duty to issue a certificate proclaiming a particular amendment duly ratified and part of the Constitution if the legislatures of at least three-quarters of the states approve the proposed amendment. The Amendment and its certificate of ratification are then published in the Federal Register and the amendment is included in the United States Statutes at Large. Before the enactment of that statute in 1984, that duty was vested in the General Services Administration, and, before the establishment of that agency in 1949, it formed part of the duties of the United States secretary of state.

In accordance with 1 U.S.C. §§ 2–106a of the United States Code, the archivist of the United States also receives the original version of all statutes of the United States, once enacted. Joint resolutions and acts of Congress signed into law by the president are delivered by the Office of the President to the National Archives. The same happens if a bill becomes law because the president fails to approve or veto it. If the president vetoes a bill but the presidential veto is overridden, the new law is transmitted to the National Archives not by the office of the president, but by Congress: in this case, the presiding officer of the last house to consider the bill certifies that the presidential objection was overridden, and sends the new law to the archivist. In all cases, the National Archives maintains custody of the original document and (by means of the Office of the Federal Register, a division of the National Archives), assigns the new act of Congress a public law number, provides for its publication as a slip law and for the inclusion of the new statute in the United States Statutes at Large. The actual printing and circulation of the slip law and of the volumes of the United States Statutes at Large is the responsibility of the Government Publishing Office, headed by the director of the U.S. Government Publishing Office.

By means of the Office of the Federal Register, the National Archives also publishes documents of the Executive Branch, such as presidential proclamations and executive orders, retaining custody of the original signed documents. The National Archives also has many duties regarding the preservation of presidential papers and materials.

In all United States presidential elections, the archivist also has duties concerning the custody of Electoral College documents, such as certificates of ascertainment declaring the names of the presidential electors chosen in each state, and of the certificates of vote produced by the electors of each state. In practice, these administrative responsibilities are delegated to the director of the Federal Register.

== Archivists of the United States ==
The following persons served as the Archivist of the United States:

No. (Note: A dash denotes Acting Archivist of the United States.)	Portrait	Archivist	Term		Appointed by	Ref.
No.	Portrait	Archivist	Start	End	Appointed by	Ref.
1		Robert Digges Wimberly Connor	October 10, 1934	September 15, 1941	Franklin D. Roosevelt	
2		Solon J. Buck	September 18, 1941	May 31, 1948	Franklin D. Roosevelt	
3		Wayne C. Grover	June 2, 1948	November 6, 1965	Harry S. Truman	
–		Robert H. Bahmer	November 7, 1965 (Note: Served first as Acting Archivist of the United States from November 7, 1965, until his appointment as Archivist of the United States on January 16, 1966)	January 16, 1966	Lyndon B. Johnson	
4		Robert H. Bahmer	January 16, 1966	March 9, 1968	Lyndon B. Johnson	
–		James B. Rhoads	March 10, 1968 (Note: Served first as Acting Archivist of the United States from March 10, 1968, until his appointment as Archivist of the United States on May 2, 1968)	May 2, 1968	Lyndon B. Johnson	
5		James B. Rhoads	May 2, 1968	August 31, 1979	Lyndon B. Johnson	
–		James E. O'Neill	September 1, 1979	July 23, 1980	Jimmy Carter	
6		Robert M. Warner	July 24, 1980	April 15, 1985	Jimmy Carter	
–		Frank G. Burke	April 16, 1985	December 4, 1987	Ronald Reagan	
7		Don W. Wilson	December 4, 1987	March 24, 1993	Ronald Reagan	
–		Trudy Huskamp Peterson	March 25, 1993	May 29, 1995	Bill Clinton	
8		John W. Carlin	May 30, 1995	February 15, 2005	Bill Clinton	
9		Allen Weinstein	February 16, 2005	December 19, 2008	George W. Bush	
–		Adrienne Thomas	December 19, 2008	November 5, 2009	George W. Bush	
10		David Ferriero	November 6, 2009	April 30, 2022	Barack Obama	
–		Debra Steidel Wall	May 1, 2022	May 17, 2023	Joe Biden	
11		Colleen Joy Shogan	May 17, 2023	February 7, 2025	Joe Biden	
–		William J. Bosanko	February 7, 2025	February 16, 2025	Donald Trump	
–		Marco Rubio	February 16, 2025	February 4, 2026	Donald Trump	
–	Vacant	–	February 5, 2026	April 2, 2026	Donald Trump	(Note: Jim Byron served as Senior Advisor to the Archivist of the United States in lieu of an Acting Archivist, until his resignation on April 3, 2026.)
–		Edward Forst	April 3, 2026	August 21, 2026	Donald Trump	
12		Bradford Wilson	August 21, 2026	present	Donald Trump	
