= List of United States presidential campaign slogans =

This is a list of U.S. presidential campaign slogans from 1840 onward.

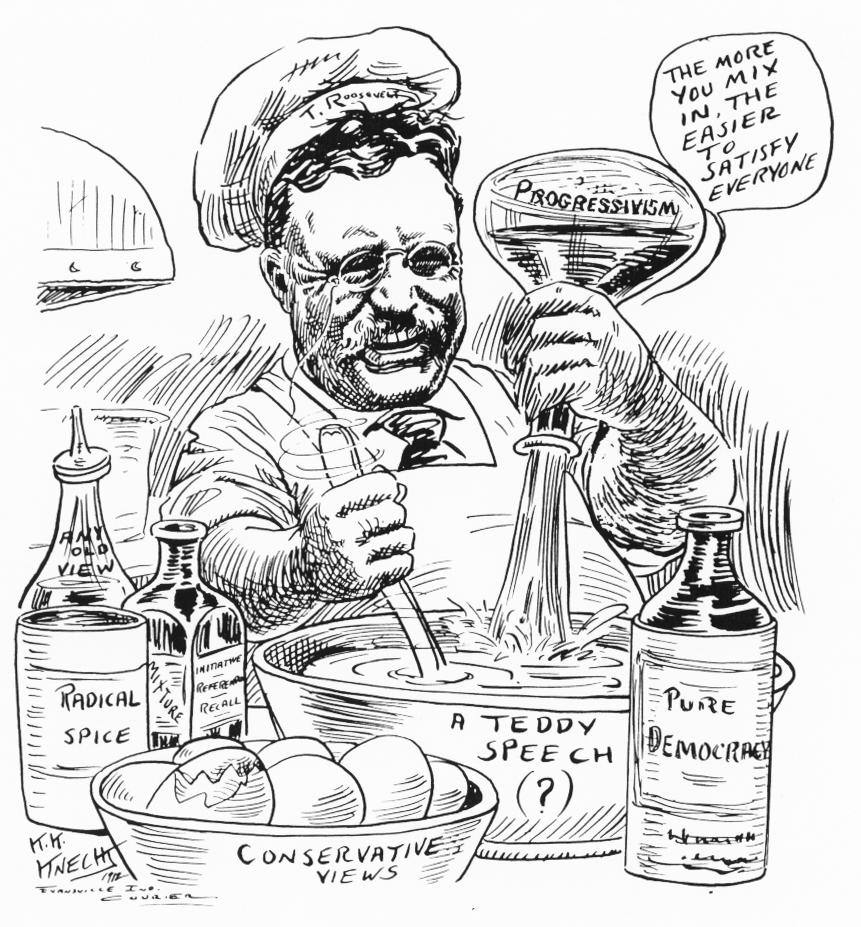
1912 editorial cartoon of Theodore Roosevelt by Karl K. Knecht

== 1800–1896 ==
=== 1800 ===
- Millions for Defense, but Not a Cent for Tribute!. Federalist slogan against Jeffersonian Republicans in 1800. During the XYZ Affair, the French foreign minister, Talleyrand, refused to negotiate with the U.S. envoys sent by President Adams unless they paid a bribe. The Jeffersonians were pro-French.

=== 1812 ===
- “Mr. Madison’s War,” “Virginia Dynasty,” “Mr. Madison and War! Mr. Clinton and Peace!” “Peace and Commerce,” and "the Peace Party” ' were some of the catch phrases and slogans the Federalists wielded in their opposition to war. The War of 1812 came and American victories at its end ruined the defeatists, and their party faded away.

=== 1816 ===
There was practically no campaigning with little opposition to James Monroe.

=== 1820 ===
The Era of Good Feelings climaxed with a nearly unanimous vote to re-elect Monroe.

=== 1824 ===
Seventeen men entered the presidential race, and a newspaper reported that "electioneering begins to wax hot." Henry Clay campaigned for his "American System" of economic stimulus. But the other campaigns did not use policy-oriented slogans but instead focused on scandal mongering and character assassination. The contest went to the House of Representatives, where Clay threw his support to elect John Quincy Adams. That squeezed out the popular favorite General Andrew Jackson of Tennessee.

=== 1828 ===
Andrew Jackson came roaring back in 1828, making Corrupt Bargain his campaign slogan.

=== 1840 ===
- "Tippecanoe and Tyler Too" – 1840 U.S. presidential slogan of William Henry Harrison. Tippecanoe was a famous 1811 battle in which Harrison defeated Tecumseh; John Tyler was Harrison's running mate.
- "Independent Treasury and Liberty" – Martin Van Buren

=== 1844 ===
- "54-40 or fight" – James K. Polk, highlighting his position on resolving the Oregon Territory boundary dispute with Russia and the United Kingdom.
- "Reannexation of Texas and Reoccupation of Oregon" – James K. Polk, drawing attention to his stand on Texas annexation and the Oregon boundary question.
- Who is James K. Polk? suggesting that Polk was inexperienced and unqualified.
- Hurrah! Hurrah! The Country's Risin', for Henry Clay and Frelinghuysen! – Whigs Henry Clay and running mate Theodore Frelinghuysen.

=== 1848 ===
- "For President of the People" – Zachary Taylor
- "The Sub Treasury and the Tariff of '46" – Lewis Cass
- "Resolved, That we inscribe on our banner, FREE SOIL, FREE SPEECH, FREE LABOR, AND FREE MEN, and under it we will fight on, and fight ever, until a triumphant victory shall reward our exertions." Free Soil Party in 1848.

=== 1852 ===
- "We Polked you in '44, We shall Pierce you in '52" – 1852 U.S. presidential campaign slogan of Franklin Pierce; the '44 referred to the 1844 election of James K. Polk as president.
- "The Hero of many battles." – Winfield Scott
- "First in war, first in peace" – Winfield Scott

=== 1856 ===
- "Free Soil, Free Labor, Free Speech, Free Men, Fremont" – 1856 U.S. presidential campaign slogan of John Fremont
- "Fremont and freedom" – John Fremont
- "We'll Buck 'em in '56" – James Buchanan, playing on "Old Buck", the nickname associated with his last name.
- "We Po'ked 'em in '44, we Pierced 'em in '52, and we'll Buck 'em in '56".

=== 1860 ===
- "Vote yourself a farm and horses" – Abraham Lincoln, referring to Republican support for a law granting homesteads on the American frontier areas of the West.
- "The Union must and shall be preserved!" – Abraham Lincoln
- "Protection to American industry" – Abraham Lincoln
- "True to the Union and the Constitution to the last." – Stephen A. Douglas
- "The champion of popular sovereignty." – Stephen A. Douglas
- "The Union now and forever" – Stephen A. Douglas
- The Union and the Constitution" – John Bell (Also "John Bell and the Constitution", and "The Union, the Constitution, and the enforcement of the laws.")

=== 1864 ===
- "'Don't swap horses in the middle of the stream.'" - slogan of Abraham Lincoln's National Union Party during the 1864 presidential election, arguing in favor of his reelection while temporarily dropping the "Republican Party" name in order to attract War Democrats. The slogan has since been adopted by various incumbents during times of crisis, most famously by Franklin D. Roosevelt in the 1944 wartime presidential election and by George W. Bush in the 2004 presidential election during the war on terror.
- "Union, liberty, peace" – Abraham Lincoln
- "For Union and Constitution" – Abraham Lincoln (Also "The Union and the Constitution")
- "An honorable, permanent and happy peace." – George B. McClellan

=== 1868 ===
- "Let Us Have Peace" – 1868 presidential campaign slogan of Ulysses S. Grant
- "Vote as You Shot" – 1868 presidential campaign slogan of Ulysses S. Grant
- "Peace, Union, and constitutional government." – Horatio Seymour

=== 1872 ===
- "Grant Us Another Term" – Ulysses S. Grant
- Turn the Rascals Out – 1872 Horace Greeley slogan against Grantism.
- Universal amnesty, Liberty, equality and fraternity, Impartial suffrage – Greeley slogan showing support for reconciling with white ex-Confederates.

=== 1876 ===
- "Tilden and Reform" – Samuel Tilden, the Democratic candidate
- "Honest Sam Tilden" – Samuel Tilden
- "Tilden or Blood!" – 1877 slogan of Tilden supporters during post-election controversy that led to the Compromise of 1877
- "Hayes the true and Wheeler too" – Slogan and campaign song title for Rutherford B. Hayes and William A. Wheeler, with song adapted from 1840s "Tippecanoe and Tyler too".
- "The boys in blue vote for Hayes and Wheeler" – Hayes' appeal to fellow Union Army veterans.

=== 1884 ===
- "Rum, Romanism and Rebellion" a local clergyman introduced Republican candidate Blaine with this remark, which insulted German drinkers, Catholics, and Southerners, respectively. The Democrats eagerly seized on this slogan to hold those Democratic factions in line and thereby won the election.
- Ma, Ma, where's my Pa? – Used by Republicans against Grover Cleveland. The slogan referred to the allegation that Cleveland had fathered an illegitimate child. When Cleveland was elected, his Democratic supporters added "Gone to the White House, Ha, Ha, Ha!".
- "Burn this letter!" – Cleveland supporters' attack on Blaine's supposed corruption, quoting a line from Blaine correspondence that became public.
- "Blaine, Blaine, James G. Blaine! The continental liar from the state of Maine!" – Cleveland campaign attack on Blaine's reputation for corruption in office.

=== 1888 ===
- "Rejuvenated Republicanism" – Benjamin Harrison
- "Grandfather's hat fits Ben!" – Benjamin Harrison, referring to his grandfather, William Henry Harrison
- "Tippecanoe and Morton too" – Slogan and campaign song title for Benjamin Harrison and Levi P. Morton, with song adapted from 1840s "Tippecanoe and Tyler too".
- "Unnecessary taxation oppresses industry." – Grover Cleveland
- "Reduce the tariff on necessaries of life." – Grover Cleveland

=== 1892 ===
- "Our choice: Cleve and Steve." – Grover Cleveland and Adlai Stevenson
- "Tariff Reform" – Grover Cleveland
- "No Force Bill." – Grover Cleveland (To which southern Democrats appended "No Negro Domination
- "Protection-Reciprocity-Honest Money." – Benjamin Harrison

=== 1896 ===
- "Patriotism, Protection, and Prosperity" – William McKinley
- "No Cross of Gold, No Crown of Thorns." – William Jennings Bryan

== 1900–1996 ==
=== 1900 ===
- "Four more years of the full dinner pail" – William McKinley
- "Let Well Enough Alone" – William McKinley

=== 1904 ===
- "A Square Deal All Around" – Theodore Roosevelt
- "To Assure Continued Prosperity" – Theodore Roosevelt
- "National Unity. Prosperity. Advancement. " – Theodore Roosevelt

=== 1908 ===
- "Vote for Taft now, you can vote for Bryan any time" – William Howard Taft. The slogan referred to Bryan's two previous failed presidential bids in 1896 and 1900
- "Facing the Future" – William Jennings Bryan
- "Shall the People Rule" – William Jennings Bryan

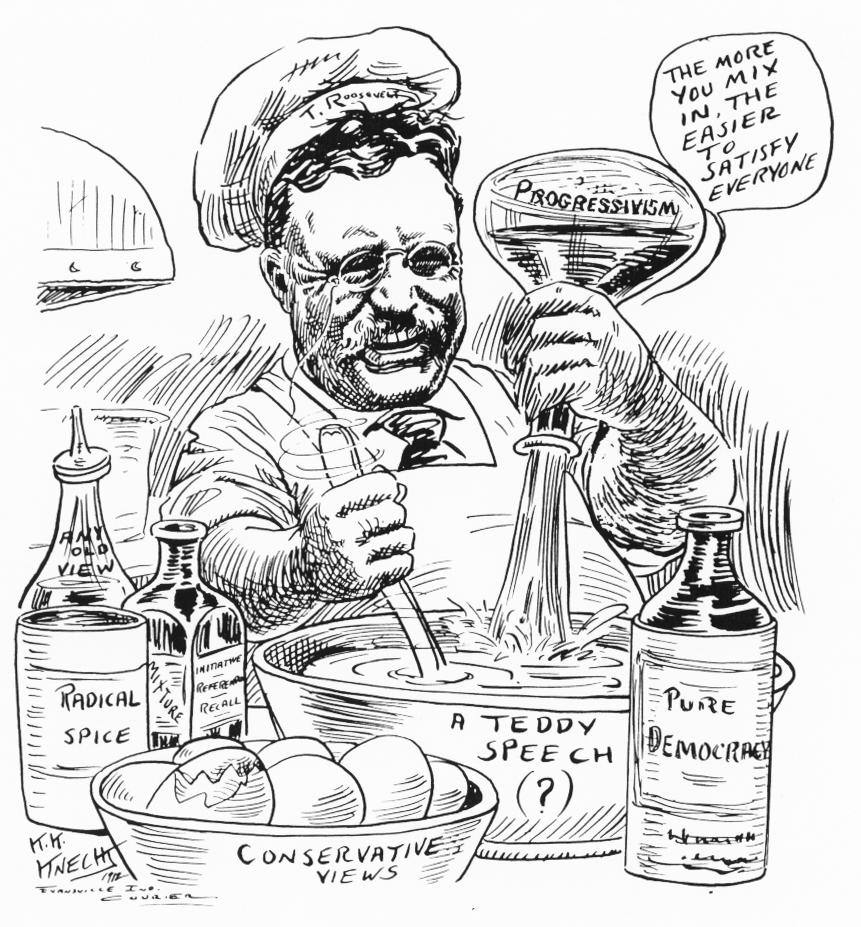
1912 editorial cartoon of Roosevelt by Karl K. Knecht

=== 1912 ===
- "It is nothing but fair to leave Taft in the chair" – William Howard Taft
- "I am for Wilson and an 8 Hour Day" – Woodrow Wilson
- New Nationalism the program announced by Roosevelt in 1910 and expanded in 1912.
- We stand at Armageddon and we battle for the Lord, Roosevelt accepting the nomination of his crusading new party on June 17, 1912.

=== 1916 ===
- "America First and America Efficient" – Charles Evans Hughes
- "He has kept us out of war." – Woodrow Wilson 1916 U.S. presidential campaign slogan
- "He proved the pen mightier than the sword." – Woodrow Wilson 1916 U.S. presidential campaign slogan
- "War in Europe – Peace in America – God Bless Wilson" – Woodrow Wilson 1916 U.S. presidential campaign slogan

=== 1920 ===
- "Return to normalcy" – 1920 U.S. presidential campaign theme of Warren G. Harding, referring to returning to normal times following World War I.
- "America First" – 1920 US presidential campaign theme of Warren G. Harding, tapping into isolationist and anti-immigrant sentiment after World War I.
- "Peace. Progress. Prosperity." – James M. Cox
- "From Atlanta Prison to the White House, 1920." – Eugene V. Debs, in reference to his imprisonment under the Sedition Act during World War I

=== 1924 ===
- "Keep Cool and Keep Coolidge" – The 1924 presidential campaign slogan of Calvin Coolidge.
- "Honest Days With Davis" – John W. Davis (Usually used in conjunction with an illustration of Teapot Rock to highlight the Teapot Dome scandal.)

=== 1928 ===
- "Who but Hoover?" – 1928 U.S. presidential campaign slogan of Herbert Hoover.
- "A chicken in every pot and a car in every garage" – Commonly cited version of a claim asserted in a Republican Party flier on behalf of the 1928 U.S. presidential campaign of Herbert Hoover.
- "Honest. Able. Fearless." – Al Smith
- "All for 'Al' and 'Al' for All." – Al Smith
- "Make your wet dreams come true." – Al Smith, referring to his stand in favor of repealing Prohibition.

=== 1932 ===
- "Happy Days Are Here Again" – 1932 slogan by Democratic presidential candidate Franklin D. Roosevelt.
- "We are turning the corner" – 1932 campaign slogan in the depths of the Great Depression by Republican president Herbert Hoover.

=== 1936 ===
- "Defeat the New Deal and Its Reckless Spending" – 1936 U.S. presidential campaign slogan of Alfred M. Landon
- "Let's Get Another Deck" – 1936 U.S. presidential campaign slogan of Alfred M. Landon, using a card game metaphor to answer the "new deal" cards metaphor of Franklin D. Roosevelt
- "Let's Make It a Landon-Slide" – 1936 U.S. presidential campaign slogan of Alfred M. Landon
- "Life, Liberty, and Landon" – 1936 U.S. presidential campaign slogan of Alfred M. Landon
- "Land on Washington" – 1936 U.S. presidential campaign slogan of Alfred M. Landon
- "Remember Hoover!" – 1936 U.S. presidential campaign slogan of Franklin D. Roosevelt
- "Forward with Roosevelt" – Franklin Roosevelt

=== 1940 ===
- "Better A Third Termer than a Third Rater" – 1940 U.S. presidential campaign slogan of Franklin D. Roosevelt
- "I Want Roosevelt Again!" – Franklin D. Roosevelt
- "Willkie for the Millionaires, Roosevelt for the Millions" – Franklin D. Roosevelt
- "Carry on with Roosevelt" – Franklin D. Roosevelt
- "No Third Term" – 1940 U.S. presidential campaign slogan of Wendell L. Willkie
- "No Fourth Term Either" – Wendell Willkie
- "Roosevelt for Ex-President" – 1940 U.S. presidential campaign slogan of Wendell Willkie
- "There's No Indispensable Man" – 1940 U.S. presidential campaign slogan of Wendell L. Willkie
- "We Want Willkie" – 1940 U.S. presidential campaign slogan of Wendell L. Willkie
- "Win with Willkie" – 1940 U.S. presidential campaign slogan of Wendell L. Willkie

=== 1944 ===
- "Don't swap horses in midstream" – 1944 campaign slogan of Franklin D. Roosevelt. The slogan was also used by Abraham Lincoln in the 1864 election.
- "We are going to win this war and the peace that follows" – 1944 campaign slogan in the midst of World War II by Democratic president Franklin D. Roosevelt
- "Dewey or don't we" – Thomas E. Dewey
- "Win the war quicker with Dewey and Bricker" - 1944 campaign slogan during World War II in support of Thomas E. Dewey and his vice presidential nominee, John W. Bricker

=== 1948 ===
"I'm Just Wild About Harry"
Instrumental version of "I'm Just Wild About Harry" recorded May 17, 1922. Duration 3:54.

- "I'm just wild about Harry" – 1948 U.S. presidential slogan of Harry S. Truman, taken from a 1921 popular song title written by Noble Sissle and Eubie Blake
- "Pour it on 'em, Harry!" – 1948 U.S. presidential campaign slogan of Harry S. Truman
- "Give Em Hell, Harry!" – Harry Truman (After a man shouted it during one of his whistle stop railroad tours)
- "The Buck Stops Here"—Harry Truman (Sign kept on The Resolute Desk that became a staple of Truman's presidency)
- "Dew it with Dewey" – Thomas E. Dewey
- "Win with Dewey" – Thomas E. Dewey
- "Get in the fight for states' rights" – Strom Thurmond
- "Work with Wallace" – Henry A. Wallace
- "Work for Peace" – Henry A. Wallace

=== 1952 ===
- I like Ike – Dwight D. Eisenhower, Republican winner
- Madly for Adlai – Adlai Stevenson

=== 1956 ===
- I still like Ike – Eisenhower
- Peace and Prosperity – Eisenhower, who ended the Korean War in 1953,
- Adlai and Estes – The Bestest – Adlai Stevenson and Estes Kefauver, the losing Democrats
- The Winning Team – Stevenson and Kefauver.

=== 1960 ===
- "A time for greatness" – U.S. presidential campaign theme of John F. Kennedy (Kennedy also used "We Can Do Better" and "Leadership for the 60s").
- "Peace, Experience, Prosperity" – Richard Nixon's slogan showing his expertise over Kennedy.
- "Experience Counts" - Richard Nixon slogan boasting the experience of the Nixon Lodge ticket.
- "Kennedy, Kennedy, Kennedy" – Catchy jingle extolling Kennedy's virtues.

=== 1964 ===
- "All the way with LBJ" – 1964 U.S. presidential campaign slogan of Lyndon B. Johnson
- "In Your Heart, You Know He's Right" – 1964 U.S. presidential campaign slogan of Barry Goldwater
- "In Your Guts, You Know He's Nuts" – 1964 U.S. presidential campaign slogan of Lyndon B. Johnson supporters, answering Goldwater's slogan
- "The Stakes Are Too High For You To Stay Home" - 1964 U.S. campaign slogan of Lyndon B. Johnson, as seen in The Daisy Ad
- "LBJ for the USA" - 1964 U.S. presidential campaign slogan of Lyndon B. Johnson
- "A Choice – Not an Echo" - 1964 U.S. presidential campaign slogan of Barry Goldwater

=== 1968 ===
- "Some People Talk Change, Others Cause It" – Hubert Humphrey, 1968
- "This time, vote like your whole world depended on it" – 1968 slogan of Richard Nixon
- "To Begin Anew..." – Eugene McCarthy, 1968
- "Nixon's the One" – Richard M. Nixon, 1968
- "Send them a Message" – George Wallace, 1968
- "Stand Up for America" – George Wallace, 1968

=== 1972 ===
- "Nixon Now" – Richard M. Nixon, 1972 (also, "Nixon Now, More than Ever" and "President Nixon. Now more than ever")
- "Come home, America" – George McGovern, 1972
- "Acid, Amnesty, and Abortion for All" – 1972 anti-Democratic Party slogan, from a statement made to reporter Bob Novak by Missouri Senator Thomas F. Eagleton (as related in Novak's 2007 memoir, Prince of Darkness)
- "Dick Nixon Before He Dicks You" – Popular anti-Nixon slogan, 1972
- "They can't lick our Dick" – Popular campaign slogan for Nixon supporters
- "Don't change Dicks in the midst of a screw, vote for Nixon in '72" – Popular campaign slogan for Nixon supporters
- "Unbought and Unbossed" – official campaign slogan for Shirley Chisholm
- "McGovern. Democrat. For the People" - George McGovern, 1972

=== 1976 ===
- "He's making us proud again" – Gerald Ford
- "Not Just Peanuts" – Jimmy Carter
- "A Leader, for a Change" (also "Leaders, for a Change") – Jimmy Carter
- "Why not the Best?" – Jimmy Carter
- "Peaches And Cream" – Jimmy Carter (from Georgia) and running mate Walter Mondale (from Minnesota)

=== 1980 ===
- "Are You Better Off Than You Were Four Years Ago?" – Ronald Reagan
- "Let's Make America Great Again" – Ronald Reagan
- "A Tested and Trustworthy Team" – Jimmy Carter and Walter Mondale

=== 1984 ===
- "It's Morning Again in America" – Ronald Reagan
- "For New Leadership" (also "America Needs New Leadership") – Walter Mondale
- "Where's the beef?" – Walter Mondale. An advertising slogan used by the restaurant chain Wendy's to imply that its competitors served sandwiches with relatively small contents of beef. Used by Mondale to imply that the program policies of rival candidate Gary Hart lacked actual substance.

=== 1988 ===
- "A Leader for America" – Robert J. Dole
- "Kinder, Gentler Nation" – George H. W. Bush
- "Thousand Points of Light" – George H. W. Bush
- "Read My Lips, No New Taxes" – George H. W. Bush
- "On Your Side" – Michael Dukakis
- "Next Frontier" – a slogan used by Michael Dukakis emulating John F. Kennedy's 1960 slogan about the "New Frontier".
- "Keep Hope Alive" – Jesse Jackson

=== 1992 ===
- "For America, for the people" – 1992 U.S. presidential campaign slogan of Bill Clinton
- "It's Time to fix America" – a theme of the 1992 U.S. presidential campaign of Bill Clinton
- "Putting People first" – 1992 U.S. presidential campaign slogan of Bill Clinton
- "It's the economy, stupid" – originally intended for an internal audience, it became the de facto slogan for the Bill Clinton campaign
- "Stand by the President" – George H. W. Bush
- "A Proud country" – George H. W. Bush
- "Don't Change my team in the Middle of my Stream" – George H. W. Bush and Dan Quayle
- "America first" – Pat Buchanan
- "Down with King George" – Pat Buchanan, in reference to Bush
- "Send Bush a message" – Pat Buchanan
- "Conservative of America" – Pat Buchanan
- "A Voice for the voiceless" – Pat Buchanan
- "Ross for Boss" – Ross Perot
- "I'm Ross, and you're the Boss!" – Ross Perot
- "Leadership for a Change" – Ross Perot

=== 1996 ===
- "Building a bridge to the twenty-first century" – Bill Clinton
- "Bob Dole. A Better Man. For a Better America." or "The Better Man for a Better America" – Bob Dole
- "Go Pat Go" – Pat Buchanan

== 2000–present ==
=== 2000 ===
- "Leadership for the New Millennium" – Al Gore presidential campaign
- "Prosperity and Progress" – alternative slogan of the Al Gore presidential campaign
- "Compassionate Conservatism" – George W. Bush presidential campaign
- "Reformer with Results" – George W. Bush presidential campaign

=== 2004 ===
==== Republican Party candidates ====
- "A Safer World and a More Hopeful America" – George W. Bush presidential campaign

==== Democratic Party candidates ====
- "A Stronger America" – John Kerry campaign
- "Let America Be America Again" – John Kerry presidential campaign alternative slogan
- "Dean for America" – Howard Dean campaign slogan

==== Libertarian Party candidates ====
- "Lighting the fires of Liberty, one heart at a time" – used by Michael Badnarik's campaign

=== 2008 ===
==== Democratic Party candidates ====
- "Yes We Can" – Barack Obama campaign chant, 2008
- "We are the ones we've been waiting for." – 2008 U.S. presidential campaign rallying cry of Barack Obama during the Democratic convention in Denver.
- "Change We Can Believe In." – 2008 US presidential campaign slogan of Barack Obama
- "Change We Need." and "Change." – 2008 U.S. presidential campaign slogan of Barack Obama during the general election.
- "Fired up! Ready to go!" – Barack Obama campaign chant, 2008
- "Hope" – 2008 U.S. presidential campaign slogan of Barack Obama during the general election.
- "Ready for change, ready to lead" – Hillary Clinton campaign slogan, also "Big Challenges, Real Solutions: Time to Pick a President," "In to Win," "Working for Change, Working for You," and "The strength and experience to make change happen."

==== Republican Party candidates ====
- "Country First" – 2008 U.S. presidential campaign slogan of John McCain
- "Reform, prosperity and peace" – 2008 U.S. presidential motto of John McCain.

==== Independent candidates ====
- "People Fighting Back", and "We'll fight back" – Ralph Nader campaign slogan

==== Libertarian Party candidates ====
- "Liberty for America" – used by Bob Barr's campaign

=== 2012 ===
==== Democratic Party candidates ====
- "Forward" – 2012 U.S. presidential slogan of Barack Obama.
- "Middle Class First" - 2012 U.S. presidential slogan of Barack Obama.

==== Republican Party candidates ====
- "Believe in America" – 2012 U.S. presidential slogan of Mitt Romney.
- "America's Comeback Team" – 2012 U.S. presidential slogan of Mitt Romney after picking Paul Ryan as his running mate
- "Obama Isn't Working" – slogan used by Mitt Romney's 2012 campaign, a takeoff of "Labour Isn't Working," a similar campaign previously used by the British Conservative Party
- "Restore Our Future" – slogan used by Mitt Romney's 2012 campaign
- "The Courage to Fight for America" – 2012 U.S. presidential slogan of Rick Santorum.
- "Restore America Now" – 2012 U.S. presidential slogan of Ron Paul.

==== Libertarian Party candidates ====
- "The People's President" – Gary Johnson campaign slogan
- "Live Free" – Gary Johnson campaign slogan

==== Green Party candidates ====
- "A Green New Deal for America" – Official slogan of the Jill Stein campaign

==== Constitution Party candidates ====
- "Citizenship Matters" – Virgil Goode campaign slogan

=== 2016 ===
==== Republican Party candidates ====
- "Make America Great Again!" – used by Donald Trump's campaign (Originally used by Ronald Reagan)
- "Courageous Conservatives" and "Reigniting the Promise of America" – used by Ted Cruz's campaign, also "TRUS(TED)," "A Time for Truth," and "Defeat the Washington Cartel"
- "A New American Century" – used by Marco Rubio's campaign.
- "Kasich For America" or "Kasich For US" – used by John Kasich's campaign
- "Heal. Inspire. Revive." – used by Ben Carson's campaign.
- "Jeb!", "Jeb can fix it," and "All in for Jeb" – used by Jeb Bush's campaign. also "Right to Rise" and "Slow and Steady Wins the Race"
- "Defeat the Washington Machine. Unleash the American Dream." – used by Rand Paul's campaign
- "From Hope to Higher Ground" – used by Mike Huckabee's campaign.
- "New Possibilities. Real Leadership." – used by Carly Fiorina's campaign.
- "Telling it like it is."– used by Chris Christie's campaign
- "Tanned, Rested, Ready."– used by Bobby Jindal's campaign

==== Democratic Party candidates ====
- "Hillary For America" – used by Hillary Clinton's campaign
- "Forward Together" – used by Clinton's campaign, on the side of her bus.
- "Fighting for us" – used by Clinton's campaign.
- "I'm With Her" – used by Clinton's campaign.
- "Stronger Together" – used by Clinton's campaign.
- "Love Trumps Hate" – used by Clinton's campaign.
- "When they go low, we go high" – used by Michelle Obama and adopted by Clinton's campaign
- "A Future To Believe In" – used by Bernie Sanders' campaign
- "Feel the Bern" – a common but unofficial slogan used by supporters of Bernie Sanders

==== Libertarian Party candidates ====
- "Our Best America Yet!" – used by Gary Johnson's campaign
- "Live Free" – used by Gary Johnson's campaign
- "#TeamGov" – used by Gary Johnson's campaign, as a reference to both Johnson and running mate Bill Weld being former Governors of New Mexico and Massachusetts respectively.
- "Be Libertarian with me" – used by Gary Johnson's campaign
- "You In?" – used by Gary Johnson's campaign
- "Make America Sane Again" – common but unofficial slogan in support of Gary Johnson's campaign
- "Taking over the government to leave everyone alone" – used by Austin Petersen's campaign

==== Green Party candidates ====
- "It's in our hands" – used by Jill Stein's campaign.

==== Independents ====
- "It's never too late to do the right thing" – used by Evan McMullin

=== 2020 ===
==== Democratic Party candidates ====
- '"Build Back Better"' – used by Joe Biden's campaign
- '"Restore The Soul of The Nation"' – used by Biden's campaign
- '"Our best days still lie ahead" – used by Biden's campaign
- '"No Malarkey!"' – used by Biden's campaign
- '"Bye Don"' – a common play on words by Biden's campaign in reference to Donald Trump.
- "Not me. Us." – used by Bernie Sanders' campaign
- "Feel the Bern." – used by Sanders' campaign
- "Dream Big Fight Hard" – used by Elizabeth Warren's campaign
- "I like Mike" – used by Michael Bloomberg's campaign
- "Mike will get it done" – used by Bloomberg's campaign
- "Win the Era" – used by Pete Buttigieg's campaign
- "A new generation of leadership" – used by Buttigieg's campaign
- "BOOT EDGE EDGE" – used by Buttigieg's campaign
- "Lead with Love" – used by Tulsi Gabbard's campaign
- "Humanity First" – used by Andrew Yang's campaign
- "Not left. Not right. Forward." – used by Yang's campaign
- "MATH - Make America Think Harder" – used by Yang's campaign
- "Building Opportunity Together" – used by Michael Bennet's campaign
- "Focus on the Future" – used by John Delaney's campaign
- "We Rise" – used by Cory Booker's campaign
- "Join the Evolution!" – used by Marianne Williamson's campaign
- "One Nation. One Destiny." – used by Julian Castro's campaign
- "For The People" – used by Kamala Harris's campaign
- "We're all in this together." – used by Beto O'Rourke's campaign
- "Our Future Is Now" – used by Tim Ryan's campaign
- "Working People First" – used by Bill de Blasio's campaign
- "Brave Wins" – used by Kirsten Gillibrand's campaign
- "Our Moment" – used by Jay Inslee's campaign
- "Stand Tall" – used by John Hickenlooper's campaign
- "End the American Empire" – used by Mike Gravel's campaign
- "Go Big. Be Bold. Do Good." – used by Eric Swalwell's campaign
- "Take. Our. Democracy. Back." – used by Ben Gleib's 2020 presidential campaign
- "Let's Save America, Ok?" – used by Gleib's 2020 presidential campaign

==== Republican Party candidates ====
- "Keep America Great" – used by Donald Trump's campaign
- "Make America Great Again Again" – used by Trump's campaign
- "Promises Made, Promises Kept" – used by Trump's campaign
- "Buy American, Hire American" – used by Trump's campaign
- "Make Our Farmers Great Again" – used by Trump's campaign
- "Build the Wall and Crime Will Fall" – used by Trump's campaign
- "Jobs Not Mobs" – used by Trump's campaign
- "Leadership America Deserves" – used by Bill Weld's campaign

==== Libertarian Party candidates ====
- "Real change for real people" – used by Jo Jorgensen's campaign.
- "She's With Us" – used by Jorgensen's campaign.
- "Don't Vote McAfee" – used by John McAfee's campaign
- "Advance Liberty" – used by Arvin Vohra's campaign
- "Lincoln for Liberty" – used by Lincoln Chafee's campaign.

==== Green Party candidates ====
- "For Our Future" – used by Howie Hawkins' campaign
- "For an Ecosocialist Green New Deal" – used by Hawkins' campaign

==== Constitution Party candidates ====
- "We need a third way" – used by Don Blankenship's campaign

=== 2024 ===
==== Democratic Party candidates ====
- "Let's Finish the Job" – used by Joe Biden's campaign
- "Together, we can win this!" used by Kamala Harris' campaign
- "When we Fight, we Win." used by Harris' campaign.
- "We are not going back." used by Harris' campaign.
- ”Freedom” — used by Harris’ campaign.
- "Let's WIN this." used by Harris' campaign.
- "A New Way Forward." used by Harris' campaign.
- "A new beginning" – used by Marianne Williamson's campaign
- "Disrupt the system" – used by Williamson's campaign

==== Republican Party candidates ====
- "I Like Mike" - used by Mike Pence's campaign
- "Too Honest" - used by Mike Pence's campaign
- "Stand for America" – used by Nikki Haley's campaign
- "Make America Great Again!" used by Donald Trump's campaign
- "Make America Healthy Again" used by Donald Trump's campaign upon endorsement from Robert F. Kennedy, Jr.
- "I was indicted for you!" used by Donald Trump's campaign
- "Our Great American Comeback" used by Ron DeSantis's campaign
- "Asa for America!" – used by Asa Hutchinson's campaign
- "A New American Dream" used by Vivek Ramaswamy's campaign
- "Truth." used by Vivek Ramaswamy's campaign

==== Libertarian Party candidates ====
- "Chase-ing Freedom" – used by Chase Oliver's campaign.
- "The Gold New Deal" – used by Mike ter Maat's campaign.

==== Independent candidate ====
- "Declare Your Independence" – used by Robert F. Kennedy, Jr.'s campaign.
- "Freedom First" – used by Kennedy's campaign.

== See also ==
- List of United States political catchphrases
- Political history in the United States
- Slogans
