= List of United States political catchphrases =

The following is a chronological list of political catchphrases throughout the political history in the United States. This is not necessarily a list of historical quotes, but phrases that have been commonly referenced or repeated within various political contexts. For campaign slogans see List of United States presidential campaign slogans.

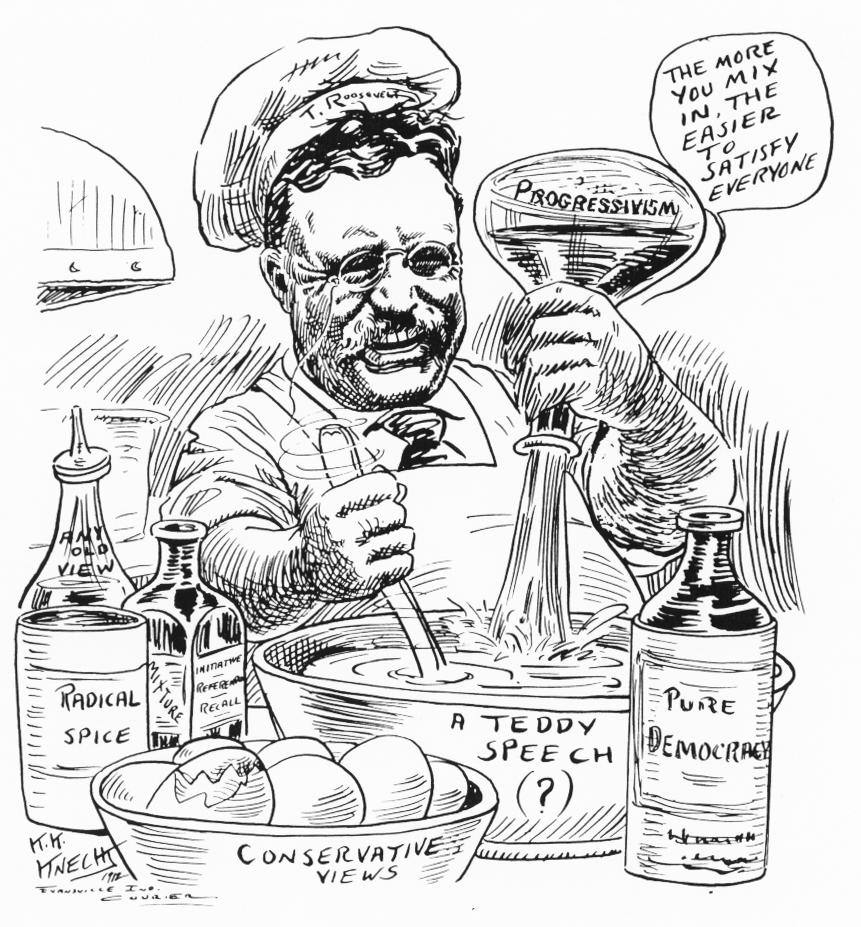
Theodore Roosevelt was a master at mixing his conservative and liberal ideals together to distill them into a popular speech to reach a wide audience. 1912 editorial cartoon by Karl Kae Knecht

== 18th-century ==
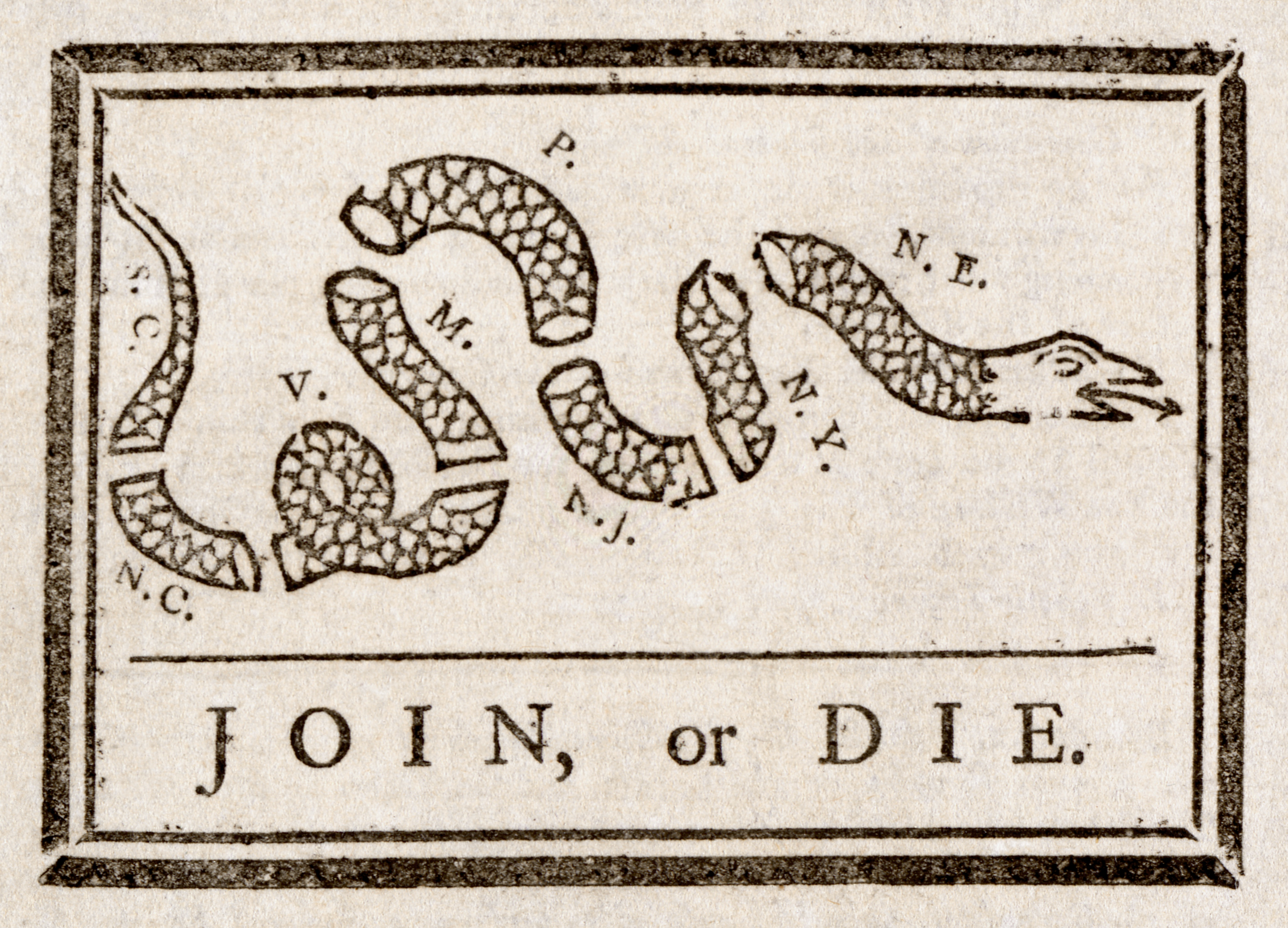

- Join, or Die, a 1754 editorial cartoon for newspapers by Benjamin Franklin. It shows a potentially powerful snake weakened by being cut into eight pieces, with each segment labeled with the initials of an American colony. It was originally a call for colonial unity against France during the French and Indian War. It was re-used in the 1770s to promote unity against Great Britain.
- A government of laws and not of men. John Adams, defining a republic as opposed to a monarchy. Boston Gazette March 6, 1775.

Gadsden flag for American warships during Revolutionary War

- Don't Tread on Me motto on Gadsden flag adopted December 1775 for naval warships. See also Pine Tree Flag
- "In the new code of laws which I suppose it will be necessary for you to make I desire you would remember the ladies, and be more generous and favourable to them than your ancestors. Do not put such unlimited power into the hands of the husbands. Remember all men would be tyrants if they could." Abigail Adams to John Adams 31 March 1776.
- "We hold these truths to be self-evident, that all men are created equal, that they are endowed by their Creator with certain unalienable Rights, that among these are Life, Liberty and the pursuit of Happiness.--That to secure these rights, Governments are instituted among Men, deriving their just powers from the consent of the governed." Thomas Jefferson, Declaration of Independence, July 2 1776.
- "The Second Day of July 1776, will be the most memorable Epocha, in the History of America.—I am apt to believe that it will be celebrated, by succeeding Generations, as the great anniversary Festival. It ought to be commemorated, as the Day of Deliverance by solemn Acts of Devotion to God Almighty. It ought to be solemnized with Pomp and Parade, with Shews, Games, Sports, Guns, Bells, Bonfires and Illuminations from one End of this Continent to the other from this Time forward forever more." John Adams to Abigail Adams written July 3d. 1776.. His predictions came true for July 4.
- I only regret that I have but one life to lose for my country. Nathan Hale, on his execution by the British for spying September 22, 1776.
- "Tis our true policy to steer clear of permanent alliances, with any portion of the foreign world." George Washington, Presidential Address 17 September 1796.
- Let me. . . warn you in the most solemn manner against the baneful effects of the spirit of party." George Washington, Presidential Address 17 September 1796.

== 19th-century ==
- We are all Republicans – we are all Federalists, Jefferson's First Inaugural Address in 1801.
- King Caucus --the secret caucus of all Jeffersonian Republicans in Congress, becomes the party's way of selecting a presidential candidate, starting with Jefferson's renomination in 1804. It finally breaks down in 1824.
- Quids or Tertium quids, were a faction of Jeffersonian Republicans after 1801. They fell apart in the 1820s and most became Jacksonian Democrats.
- The power to tax involves the power to destroy, stated the Supreme Court in McCulloch v. Maryland 1819.
- Liberty and Union, now and for ever, one and inseparable!, a famous line of Daniel Webster in his "Second Reply to Hayne" speech in January 1830. The slogan itself would later become the state motto for North Dakota.
- Our Federal Union. It must be preserved, toast made by President Andrew Jackson on April 13, 1830. It refers to the secessionist dispute that began during the Nullification Crisis and it became a slogan against nullification in the ensuing political affair.
- Locofoco Disparaging term for Democrats especially in New York often used by Whig newspapers from 1835 to mid 1850s.
- Tippecanoe and Tyler too, popular slogan for Whig Party candidates William Henry Harrison and John Tyler in the 1840 U.S. presidential election.
- A house divided against itself cannot stand., opening lines of Abraham Lincoln's famous 1858 "A House Divided" speech, addressing the division between slave states and free states in the United States at the time.
- Four score and seven years ago..., opening of Abraham Lincoln's Gettysburg Address.
- ... government of the people, by the people, for the people, shall not perish from the earth, climax of Abraham Lincoln's Gettysburg Address.
- Go West, young man, and grow up with the country newspaper editor Horace Greeley advising in favor of westward expansion.
- My country, right or wrong; if right, to be kept right; and if wrong to be set right! Carl Schurz speech in the Senate, February 29 1872.
- "I will not accept if nominated and will not serve if elected", promise by William Tecumseh Sherman when asked about a presidential bid during the 1884 presidential election. Repeated and paraphrased by various politicians and public figures in later years, including Lyndon B. Johnson in 1968, Dwight D. Eisenhower in the 1940s, Dick Cheney in 2008, and Stephen King in reference to the 2018 Maine gubernatorial election.
- You shall not press down upon the brow of labor this crown of thorns. You shall not crucify mankind upon a cross of gold. William Jennings Bryan in 1896 Cross of Gold speech, denouncing the evils of the gold standard.

== 20th-century ==
=== 1900s–1950s ===
- I am as strong as a bull moose, said Theodore Roosevelt in 1900-- His new third party in 1912 was nicknamed the Bull Moose Party.
- Speak softly, and carry a big stick, President Theodore Roosevelt In a speech on foreign policy 1903.
- Malefactors of great wealth were denounced by President Roosevelt in 1907.
- We stand at Armageddon and we battle for the Lord. Roosevelt accepting the nomination of his crusading new party on June 17, 1912.
- Suppose you were an idiot. And suppose you were a member of Congress. But I repeat myself. Mark Twain (1912).
- " Next to the right of Liberty, the right of property is the most important individual right guaranteed by the constitution." William Howard Taft 1913.
- " There is no room in this country for hyphenated Americanism." T. Roosevelt on October 12, 1915, attacking ethnic groups that supported Germany in World War I.
- The world must be made safe for democracy. President Woodrow Wilson April 2, 1917, speech to Congress calling for a declaration of war against Germany .
- Smoke-filled room, used to describe the backroom at the Blackstone Hotel in Chicago where delegates gathered to secure Warren G. Harding's nomination during the 1920 Republican National Convention. The term now means a place behind the scenes, where cigar-smoking party bosses make political decisions.
- " I pledge you, I pledge myself, to a new deal for the American people." Franklin D. Roosevelt accepting the Democratic nomination for president July 2 1932.
- The only thing we have to fear is fear itself., from Franklin D. Roosevelt's first inaugural address March 4, 1933.
- All the ills of democracy can be cured by more democracy. Al Smith speech, June 27 1933.
- "Yesterday, December 7, 1941, a date which will live in infamy" said by President Franklin D. Roosevelt after the Japanese attack on Pearl Harbor.
- I shall return. General Douglas MacArthur after forced out of the Philippines by a Japanese invasion.
- "Is there anything we can do for you? For you are the one in trouble now." Eleanor Roosevelt to Harry Truman, upon Truman learning President Roosevelt had died. Truman had asked Mrs. Roosevelt on hearing the news, "Is there anything I can do for you?"
- The buck stops here, paperweight on the desk of Harry Truman.
- I like Ike, presidential campaign slogan for Dwight D. Eisenhower.
- The wrong war, at the wrong place, at the wrong time, and with the wrong enemy - said by Chairman of the Joint Chiefs of Staff General Omar Bradley in opposition to extending the Korean War into China. Contributed to President Harry S. Truman's dismissal of the commander of U.N. forces Douglas MacArthur. Later utilized in variations in opposition to the Vietnam War and the Iraq War.
- "Clean as a hound's tooth", the moral standard promised by Republican candidate Eisenhower in the 1952 campaign, when Richard Nixon, campaigning for vice president was accused of using campaign funds for personal use.
- "And you know, the kids, like all kids, love the dog and I just want to say this right now, that regardless of what they say about it, we're gonna keep it." – famous line from the Checkers speech delivered by Richard Nixon in 1952.
- "Are you now or have you ever been a member of the Communist Party?", a common question asked by the House Un-American Activities Committee during the height of the Cold War.
- "Have you no sense of decency, sir? At long last, have you left no sense of decency?", Joseph N. Welch confronts Senator Joseph McCarthy during the televised Army–McCarthy hearings on June 9, 1954.
- " To me party platforms are contracts with the people.” Harry Truman Memoirs (1955).
- " I never give them [the public] hell. I just tell the truth, and they think it is hell." Harry Truman Memoirs (1955).
- " The idea that you can merchandise candidates for a high office like breakfast cereal–that you can gather votes like box tops–is, I think, the ultimate indignity to the democratic process." Adlai Stevenson II speech accepting the Democratic nomination for president, August 18, 1956.

=== 1960s–1970s ===
- Ask not what your country can do for you—ask what you can do for your country, from the Inaugural address of John F. Kennedy.
- "Let us never negotiate out of fear. But let us never fear to negotiate." John F. Kennedy, Inaugural address, January 20, 1961
- "You won't have Nixon to kick around anymore", said by Nixon in 1962 when he retired from politics after losing the 1962 California gubernatorial election.
- "Ich bin ein Berliner", President John F. Kennedy said "I am a Berliner" in German, in West Berlin, at a time the USSR controlled East Germany June 26, 1963.
- “In the name of the greatest people that have ever trod this earth, I draw the line in the dust and toss the gauntlet before the feet of tyranny, and I say segregation now, segregation tomorrow, segregation forever.” — Said by Alabama Governor George Wallace during his 1963 inaugural address in Montgomery, defending the institution of segregation in the southern United States and characterizing the federal government's civil rights initiatives as authoritarian. Wallace became the strongest defenders of segregation in the South during the 1960s.
- "I know it when I see it", used by Supreme Court Justice Potter Stewart to describe his threshold test for obscenity in Jacobellis v. Ohio (1964).
- "I would remind you that extremism in the defense of liberty is no vice. And let me remind you also that moderation in the pursuit of justice is no virtue'." Said by Barry Goldwater in his acceptance speech at the 1964 Republican National Convention.
- Hey, hey, LBJ, how many kids did you kill today? slogan of anti-war protests during the Vietnam War
- America, love it or leave it, slogan of pro-war protests during the Vietnam War
- Nixon's Vice President Spiro Agnew coined "nattering nabobs of negativism " in September 1970 to ridicule liberal journalists critical of Nixon.
- "Only Nixon could go to China", saying that became popular in the wake of President Nixon's visit to Communist China.
- What did the President know and when did he know it?, asked by Senator Howard Baker in the Senate Watergate hearings.
- "I'm not a crook", said by Nixon in reference to his never having profited through his government service.
- "Follow the money", popularized by All The President's Men, used in several contexts.
- "I'm a Ford, not a Lincoln", said by Gerald Ford in his first speech as president.
- "Whip inflation now", Gerald Ford's widely ridiculed speech to Congress October 8, 1974.
- "Ford to City: Drop Dead" New York Daily News Oct 30, 1975 headline, after Ford rejected financial plea from New York City.
- "When the president does it, that means that it is not illegal." Said by former president Nixon during the Frost/Nixon interviews, about his role in the Watergate scandal cover-up.

=== 1980s ===
- "Voodoo Economics", a term used by George H. W. Bush to attack President Ronald Reagan's economic policies, which came to be known as "Reaganomics", during the 1980 Republican Party presidential primaries.
- "There you go again", said by Ronald Reagan about Jimmy Carter during their 1980 presidential debate and was used by Reagan again about Walter Mondale in their 1984 presidential debate. This quotation was also borrowed by Sarah Palin during the 2008 vice presidential debate against Joe Biden.
- "Let's make America great again!" Slogan from the Reagan campaign in 1980, also used in 1992 by Bill Clinton and in 2016 by Donald Trump.
- "Are you better off now than you were four years ago?", a question posed by Ronald Reagan at the end of his debate with Jimmy Carter in 1980. Often invoked by future presidential candidates.
- "I'm from the government, and I'm here to help", said by Ronald Reagan referring to the "most terrifying words in the English language" in opposition to welfare policies.
- "In this present crisis, government is not the solution to our problems; government is the problem", said by Ronald Reagan.
- "I will not exploit, for political purposes, my opponent's youth and inexperience", said by Ronald Reagan in the second debate with Walter Mondale, defusing the age issue.
- "It's morning again in America": Ronald Reagan, in reference to the recovering economy and the dominating performance by the U.S. athletes at the Los Angeles Olympics that summer, among other things.
- "Where's the beef?", said by presidential hopeful and former Democratic Vice President Walter Mondale, when attacking Colorado Senator Gary Hart in a 1984 Democratic primary debate. Mondale meant that Hart was only doing lip service. The phrase was derived from a popular television ad for Wendy's hamburgers.
- "Trust, but verify", used by Ronald Reagan when discussing relations with the Soviet Union. Originally a Russian proverb.
- "Mistakes were made", said by Ronald Reagan in the 1987 State of the Union Address in reference to the Iran-Contra affair. Repeated by many others, including Bill Clinton and George W. Bush.
- "Mr. Gorbachev, tear down this wall!", said by Ronald Reagan while speaking in West Berlin calling on the Soviet Union to dismantle the Berlin Wall separating West Berlin from East Germany.
- "Oh, the vision thing", said by George H. W. Bush, responding to concerns that his campaign lacked a unifying theme.
- "Read my lips: no new taxes", said by George H. W. Bush during the 1988 U.S. presidential election. Bush would famously agree to a tax increase as part of a deficit-reduction deal during his actual presidency.
- Thousand points of light, first used by George H. W. Bush in his speech accepting the presidential nomination at the 1988 Republican National Convention.
- "Senator, you're no Jack Kennedy", said by Senator Lloyd Bentsen to Senator Dan Quayle in the 1988 vice presidential debate. Sometimes misquoted as "you, sir, are no Jack Kennedy."

=== 1990s ===
- "Vote for the crook. It's important." A bumper sticker slogan created by Morton Blackwell urging people to vote for Edwin Edwards over noted white supremacist David Duke in the 1991 Louisiana gubernatorial election.
- "I'm Ross, and you're the Boss", said by Ross Perot during the 1992 presidential election.
- "That giant sucking sound", said by Ross Perot in 1992 with regard to American jobs going to Mexico if the North American Free Trade Agreement (NAFTA) were ratified.
- "I didn't inhale", said by Bill Clinton regarding experimenting with marijuana while attending Oxford University.
- "It's the economy, stupid" was a phrase in American politics widely used during Bill Clinton's successful 1992 presidential campaign against George H. W. Bush. Widely attributed to Clinton advisor James Carville. The phrase, although now almost always quoted in its current form, is actually an incorrect quotation: Carville's original slogan, which he first wrote as part of a poster displayed in candidate Clinton's campaign headquarters, was "The Economy, Stupid", with no "It's".
- "I did not have sexual relations with that woman", said by Bill Clinton regarding Monica Lewinsky.
- "Vast right-wing conspiracy", used by Hillary Clinton in 1998 in defense of husband President Bill Clinton in reference to the Lewinsky scandal.
- "It depends upon what the meaning of the word 'is' is", said by Bill Clinton during a grand jury testimony related to the Lewinsky scandal, with regard to the truthfulness of his statement that "there is not a sexual relationship, an improper sexual relationship or any other kind of improper relationship".

== 21st-century ==
=== 2000s ===
- Mission accomplished speech prematurely given by President George W. Bush for the purported end of operations in Iraq.
- Fuzzy math, first used by Bush and used often by others since.
- Axis of evil, first used by Bush in his 2002 State of the Union Address, referring to North Korea, Iran, and Ba'athist Iraq.
- "There are unknown unknowns", used by Donald Rumsfeld when discussing the invasion of Iraq.
- "Reality-based community", attributed to a Bush administration official, widely believed to be Karl Rove.
- "Yes we can", used by Barack Obama as a slogan during the 2008 presidential campaign. Two years earlier, Obama's friend Deval Patrick had used the similar "Together We Can" in a successful campaign to become Governor of Massachusetts.
- "Thanks, Obama", Internet meme often used humorously to blame President Obama for any unfortunate occurrence.

=== 2010s ===
- "The rent is too damn high", the catchphrase of Jimmy McMillan, a perennial candidate and founder of the Rent Is Too Damn High Party.
- "You didn't build that", used by Barack Obama referring to federal infrastructure. The phrase was used by his opponents to suggest that Obama meant there is no individual success in the United States.
- War on women, a slogan used by the Democratic Party in attacks from 2010 onward.
- "Binders full of women", a phrase used by Mitt Romney in the 2012 presidential debates. Though intended as a supportive comment about resolving the gender pay gap through alternative hiring practices, it had the opposite effect among many voters and was frequently ridiculed.
- Black Lives Matter, a phrase and subsequent movement to protest purportedly extrajudicial killings of African-Americans at the hands of law enforcement, and failure of the police department to criminally charge the perpetrator thereafter. (See also: "Defund the police", "I can't breathe", and #SayHerName as well as counter-catchphrases All Lives Matter and Blue Lives Matter)
- "Make America Great Again", a campaign slogan used by Donald Trump; it was previously used by Ronald Reagan in 1980.
- "I like people who weren't captured", a phrase used by Donald Trump in reference to Sen. John McCain of Arizona at the Family Leadership Summit in Iowa.
- "Basket of deplorables", a phrase used by Hillary Clinton to describe some of Donald Trump's supporters. The phrase was embraced by many Trump supporters.
- "But her emails", a phrase used primarily by critics of Donald Trump to mock the abundance of attention paid to Hillary Clinton's email controversy during the 2016 election. Clinton later began selling merchandise featuring the phrase.
- "Drain the Swamp", used by many politicians, including Ronald Reagan, Nancy Pelosi, and Donald Trump.
- "Such a nasty woman", said by Donald Trump during the final presidential debate between him and Hillary Clinton. The phrase was embraced by some women voters and has also launched a feminist movement by the same name.
- "Alternative facts", a widely ridiculed phrase used by Counselor to the President Kellyanne Conway during a Meet the Press interview in January 2017, in which she defended White House Press Secretary Sean Spicer's statement about the attendance at Donald Trump's inauguration as President of the United States.
- Fake news, a term used frequently by Donald Trump.
- "Nevertheless, she persisted", used by Senate Majority Leader Mitch McConnell to describe Senator Elizabeth Warren's insistence on reading a letter from Coretta Scott King into the Congressional Record during one of Jeff Sessions's confirmation hearings. The letter outlined opposition to Senator Sessions' confirmation for a federal judgeship in 1980s.
- "Covfefe", an apparent typo used by President Donald Trump in 2017 in a Twitter post which read "Despite the constant negative press covfefe". The phrase became an internet meme, and a bill named the COVFEFE Act, meant to preserve social media posts made by the president, was later introduced in the House of Representatives.
- "A very stable genius", a phrase used by Trump in a January 6, 2018, tweet praising his own "mental stability". The phrase was subsequently used as the title of at least two books and a proposed congressional bill.
- "Believe women", a slogan of the #MeToo movement. The phrase was popularized after Justice Brett Kavanaugh's nomination hearings in 2018.

=== 2020s ===
- "Will you shut up, man?", used by Joe Biden in the first presidential debate against Donald Trump. It is sometimes quoted as "Would you shut up, man?"
- "Stop the Steal", coined by Republican political operative Roger Stone in 2016. The phrase resurfaced in 2020 in response to the conspiracy theory that widespread electoral fraud occurred during the 2020 presidential election to deny incumbent Donald Trump victory over Joe Biden.
- "Let’s go Brandon", used by detractors of President Joe Biden as a euphemism for "Fuck Joe Biden". The euphemism originated when NASCAR reporter Kelli Stavast was interviewing Brandon Brown and claimed that the crowds at the race track were cheering for him. The phrase was the origin of the Dark Brandon meme used by supporters of Biden.
- "Childless cat ladies", used by Vice Presidential Nominee JD Vance in a 2021 Fox News interview as who he perceived to really run the country. Once the comments went viral just after him being named the vice presidential nominee, MSNBC's Morning Joe host Mika Brzezinski mocked Vance by appearing on her show petting a cat that was sitting on her lap and asking: "My kids are older. Does that make me childless? I want to qualify." At the 2024 Democratic National Convention, Oprah Winfrey used the phrase, and in Taylor Swift's endorsement of Vice President Kamala Harris shortly after the second presidential debate. Swift signed off on the post by calling herself one.
- "They're eating the dogs", a false claim used by Donald Trump in the Second presidential debate.
- "Have you ever said thank you once?", a question Vice President JD Vance asked Ukrainian President Volodymyr Zelenskyy during an Oval Office meeting on February 28, 2025. The question inspired a wave of memes with distorted edits of Vance.

== See also ==
- Dog whistle (politics)#United States
- Democrat Party (epithet)
- List of U.S. presidential campaign slogans
- Pork barrel
