= Jim Byron (nonprofit executive) =

American public administrator

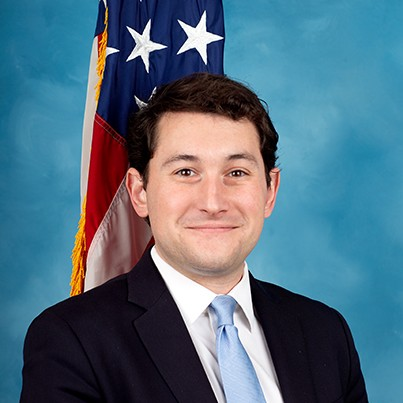
- Official portrait, 2025

President and CEO of the Richard Nixon Foundation
- Incumbent
- Assumed office April 6, 2026
- Preceded by: Joe Lopez (Acting)
- In office November 8, 2021 – February 16, 2025 (on leave)
- Preceded by: Hugh Hewitt
- Succeeded by: Joe Lopez (Acting)

Senior Advisor to the Archivist of the United States
- In office February 16, 2025 – April 3, 2026
- President: Donald Trump

Personal details
- Born: James T. Byron; 1993 (age 32–33) Santa Monica, California, U.S.
- Education: Chapman University (BBA)

James T. Byron (born 1993) is an American nonprofit executive and public administrator who is President and CEO of the Richard Nixon Foundation. In February 2025, he was appointed by U.S. President Donald Trump to manage the National Archives and Records Administration (NARA) as Senior Advisor to the Archivist of the United States. He took a leave of absence from the Richard Nixon Foundation from February 2025 to April 2026 in order to serve in the NARA role.

== Early life and education ==
Byron is a native of Santa Monica, California and grew up in Orange County where he attended Santa Margarita Catholic High School.

In 2015, he graduated from Chapman University with a bachelor's degree in business administration and a minor in history.

== Career ==
=== Richard Nixon Foundation ===
Byron began volunteering at the Richard Nixon Foundation in 2007. Upon his college graduation, Byron joined the Nixon Foundation's full time staff. He was eventually promoted to executive vice president, and worked closely with the Nixon Foundation's then-president, Hugh Hewitt, a well-known former conservative radio host who became a mentor to Byron.

Byron oversaw the Nixon Library's reopening celebration in 2016 following a 14-month renovation that had cost $15 million. In 2018, Byron published the official Nixon Library souvenir guide, A President Comes Home.

Byron was elected President and CEO of the Richard Nixon Foundation in November 2021 by the Board of Directors, succeeding Hewitt.

As President of the Nixon Foundation, Byron prioritized social media and reaching younger audiences. He has appeared on C-SPAN more than 30 times and was the guest on ‘‘Q&A’’ in December 2021.

=== National Archives and Record Administration ===
In February 2025, President Donald Trump announced on Truth Social that he appointed Byron as Senior Advisor to the Archivist of the United States, and charged him with “manag[ing] the National Archives on a day-to-day basis, while we continue our search for a full-time Archivist.” Trump had dismissed Archivist Colleen Shogan days before, and appointed U.S. Secretary of State Marco Rubio as the Acting Archivist. Byron took a leave of absence from the Nixon Foundation to accept the role.

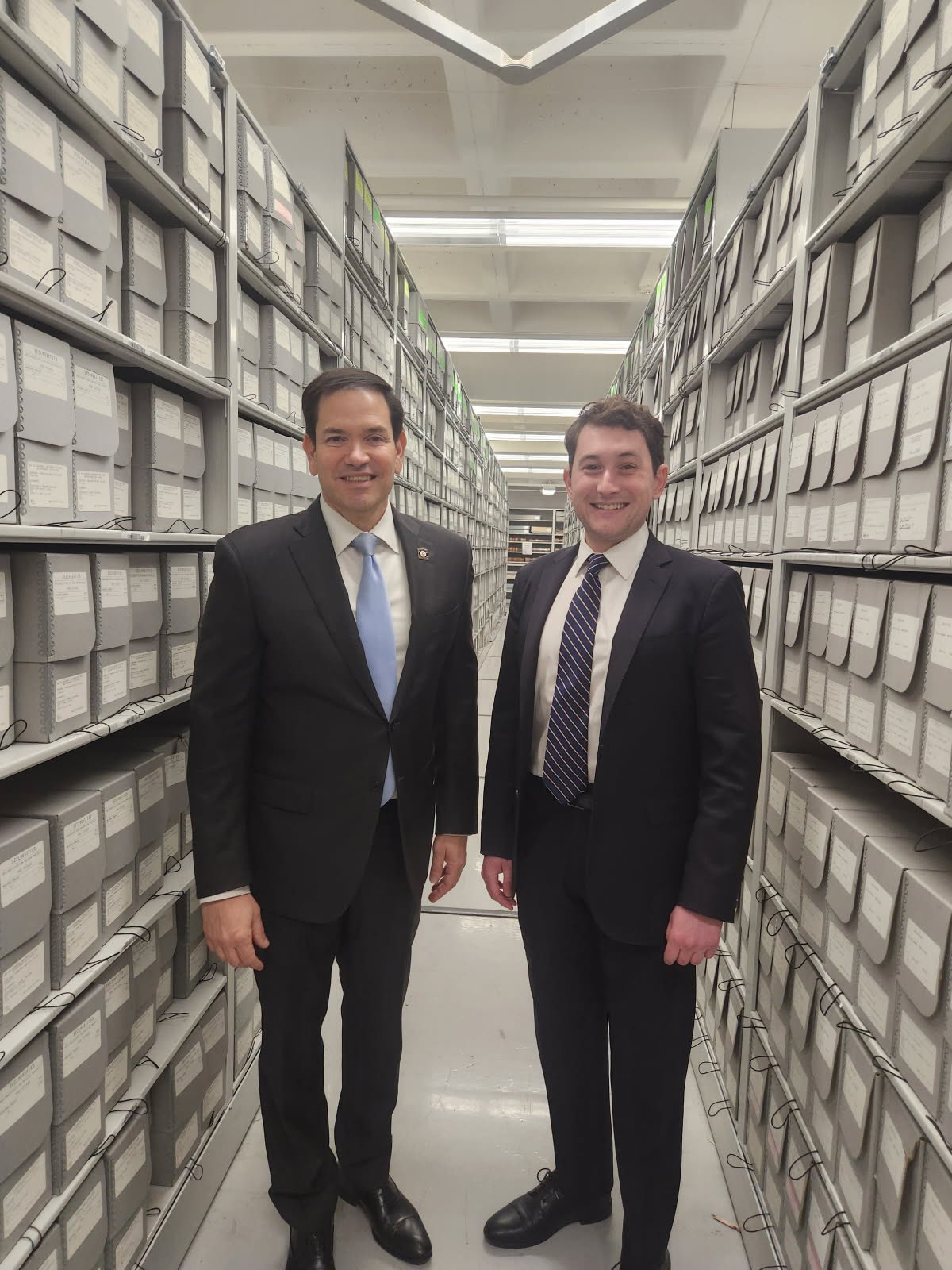
Byron with Secretary of State Marco Rubio, the Acting Archivist of the United States, April 23, 2025

Byron initiated a reorganization of the National Archives. On X, he wrote, “The goal [of the reorganization] is to improve public access to incredible documents, artifacts & holdings by shifting resources to support archival transparency,” and said that the “reallocation” would save nearly $50 million, “or more than 10% of the agency’s budget.” This reportedly included 100 layoffs.

On February 5, 2026 NARA General Counsel Matt Dummermuth announced "Prior to the conclusion of his tenure, and to the extent permitted by law, Secretary Rubio delegated the authority to perform the functions of the Archivist to James Byron, who continues to serve as Senior Advisor to the Archivist."

On March 26, 2026, Byron announced to National Archives staff that his last day as Senior Advisor to the Archivist of the United States would be April 3, 2026. He returned to the Richard Nixon Foundation on April 6, 2026.

== Personal life ==
Byron lives in Costa Mesa and enjoys playing tennis and golf. In 2022, he received Chapman University’s Distinguished Alumni Award.
