= Business Hall of Fame =

Business Hall of Fame may refer to:

- Canadian Business Hall of Fame, established by Junior Achievement of Canada in 1979
- U.S. Business Hall of Fame, established by Junior Achievement in 1975
