= Alan Hilburg =

American branding and crisis consultant

- Born: United States
- Occupations: Brand, trust and crisis management consultant
- Known for: Wendy's "Where's the beef?" campaign; U.S. Business Hall of Fame; pioneer of crisis and litigation communications

Alan Hilburg was an American trust communications and branding consultant. Hilburg specialized in crisis management, litigation and organizational brand alignment. Hilburg worked on 107 trials and over 200 global crisis cases and branding campaigns beginning in 1982 for companies like Tylenol and more recently with, Ford, Disney, YUM Brands, BP and the U.S. Veterans Administration. He had also worked in various industries including the tobacco industry (in which he created the Under 18—No Tobacco strategy), transportation, hospitality, environmental industries, chemical, healthcare and education sectors. Hilburg had over 30 years of experience as a communications strategist consultant and had also written two New York Times best-selling books and produced several Emmy-nominated documentaries.

== Education ==
Hilburg attended Franklin College in Indiana and graduated from New York Institute of Technology (NYIT).

== Career ==
After working as a senior executive at Burson-Marsteller, Hilburg established his own branding and consulting firm called Hilburg and Associates in 1987. Later, his company was acquired by Porter Novelli, a division of Omnicom Group, in 2002. The acquisition led to the creation of a new division called PNConsulting in which Hilburg carried on as president and CEO.

Hilburg has been behind national marketing and branding campaigns such as Wendy's "Where's the beef?," General Electric's "Bringing Good Things to Life," and AT&T's Olympic Torch Run. Hilburg also architected the renaissance of Bill Russell's post-playing career, working closely with Russell for more than 30 years.

Aside from his career in marketing and crisis management, Hilburg has also co-authored two New York Times best-selling books: Russell Rules...Eleven Lessons on Leadership from the Greatest Winner of the Twentieth Century with former Boston Celtics Hall of Fame player Bill Russell and W. F. Rockwell's Twelve Hats of a Company President. Hilburg served as the executive producer of the HBO documentary featuring Russell. Hilburg was also the executive producer of the first environmental film and second IMAX movie "Living Planet", which received an Academy award nomination, and also the executive producer of the PBS Special, "New Sweden."

=== CEO, Culture, Crisis management consulting ===
Hilburg is known for aiding CEOs, brands and high-profile individuals during times of trust-threatening crises and litigation transitions. He has been the recipient of six Silver Anvil Awards for international communications excellence and five Clios for his advertising campaigns.

Hilburg is also an accredited (APR) member of the Public Relations Society of America (PRSA) and is an international speaker on the relationship of trust to branding, crisis management and litigation communications.
