= Hugh Hewitt =

American conservative pundit (born 1956)

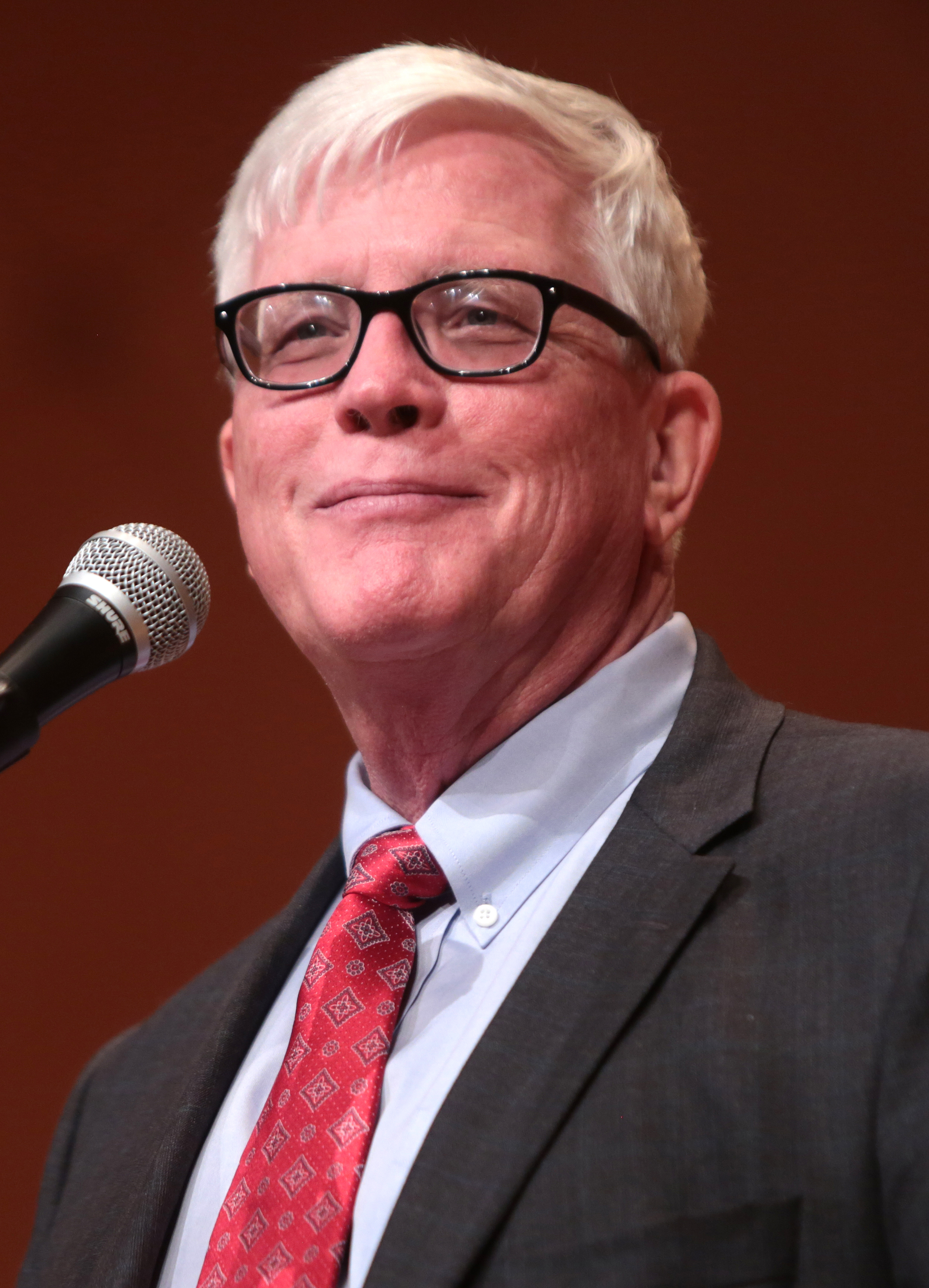
- Hewitt in 2017

President and CEO of the Richard Nixon Foundation
- In office July 1, 2019 – November 8, 2021
- Preceded by: William Baribault
- Succeeded by: Jim Byron
- In office January 23, 1989 – September 17, 1990
- Preceded by: position established
- Succeeded by: John Taylor

Deputy Director of the Office of Personnel Management
- In office July 14, 1988 – January 20, 1989
- President: Ronald Reagan
- Preceded by: James Colvard
- Succeeded by: Bill Phillips

Personal details
- Born: February 22, 1956 (age 70) Warren, Ohio, U.S.
- Party: Republican
- Spouse: Betsy Hewitt (m. 1982)
- Education: Harvard University (BA); University of Michigan (JD)

Hugh Hewitt (born February 22, 1956) is an American conservative political commentator, radio talk show host with the Salem Radio Network, attorney, academic, and author. He writes about law, society, politics, and media bias in the United States. Hewitt is a former official in the Reagan administration, the former president and CEO of the Richard Nixon Foundation, a law professor at Chapman University School of Law, a former columnist for The Washington Post, and a regular political commentator on Fox News. He is the 14th most-listened-to radio talk show host in the United States.

== Early life and education ==
Hewitt was born on February 22, 1956, in Warren, Ohio. He is the son of Marguerite (née Rohl) and William Robert Hewitt. He describes himself as "a descendant of both Ulster and the Republic through a green-orange marriage of immigrants from County Down and County Clare".

Hewitt attended John F. Kennedy Catholic High School in Warren, Ohio. He then graduated cum laude from Harvard University with a B.A. in government in 1978. At Harvard, he was president of the Harvard Republican Club, and delivered the Harvard Oration at his Class Day ceremonies before commencement. After leaving Harvard, he worked for David Eisenhower and then as a ghostwriter for Richard Nixon in California and New York, working on Nixon’s books The Real War and Leaders. At Nixon's urging he attended the University of Michigan Law School, where he was inducted into the Order of the Coif. Hewitt received his J.D. degree in 1983, then moved to Washington, D.C., to clerk for Judges Roger Robb and George MacKinnon on the U.S. Court of Appeals for the District of Columbia Circuit in 1983–84.

== Career ==
Hewitt worked in many posts in the Ronald Reagan administration, including deputy director and general counsel of the Office of Personnel Management, general counsel for the National Endowment for the Humanities, assistant White House Counsel, and special assistant to the attorney general.

In 1989, Hewitt became the executive director of the Richard Nixon Presidential Library and Museum. In 1990, he sparked controversy by proposing screening of researchers wishing to use the library resources. Hewitt suggested refusing admission to researchers deemed "unfriendly" – specifically Bob Woodward, whom he characterized as "not a responsible journalist." John Taylor, a spokesman for Nixon, overturned Hewitt's decision after two days. It became the subject of editorial rebuke in The New York Times.

Hewitt left the Nixon Library in 1990. He hosted a weekend radio talk show for the Los Angeles radio station KFI, where he broadcast until 1995. In the spring of 1992, he began co-hosting L.A. PBS member station KCET's program Life & Times, and remained with the program until the fall of 2001, when he began broadcasting his own radio show. Hewitt received three Emmys for his work on Life & Times on KCET, and also conceived and hosted the 1996 PBS series Searching for God in America.

He has worked as a weekly columnist for the Daily Standard (the online edition of The Weekly Standard) and World. He has appeared on programs such as The Dennis Miller Show, Hardball with Chris Matthews, Larry King Live, The O'Reilly Factor, The Today Show and The Colbert Report.

Hewitt also became a professor of law at Chapman University School of Law. Hewitt founded the journal Nexus Journal of Law and Policy.

In 2019, Hewitt returned to the Nixon Library as president and CEO of the Richard Nixon Foundation, the nonprofit that co-operates the Nixon Library with the National Archives and Records Administration. He succeeded businessman William H. Baribault. On his first day in the job, Hewitt announced that he would split his time between Orange County and Washington, D.C., and open a Nixon Foundation office in Washington. In November 2021, Hewitt was replaced as president and CEO by Jim Byron.

In March 2020, after Joe Biden won the South Carolina presidential primary, Hewitt predicted that Biden's victory would be of little benefit to his campaign and that Bernie Sanders would perform strongly on Super Tuesday; after Biden took the lead on Super Tuesday and eventually won the Democratic nomination, Politico named Hewitt's predictions among "the most audacious, confident and spectacularly incorrect prognostications about the year".

=== The Hugh Hewitt Show (radio) ===
Hewitt's nationally syndicated radio show, The Hugh Hewitt Show, is broadcast from Virginia 3 to 6 pm EST on weekdays. The show appears on more than 75 stations and is syndicated by the Salem Radio Network. Beginning April 4, 2016, the show moved to a morning drive time slot. Although Hewitt's background is in law, government, and politics, he also covers American cultural trends and the entertainment industry. He frequently critiques the mainstream media on air, often inviting journalists to defend their work on the show. His regular contributors include law professors John C. Eastman, former Dean of Chapman University School of Law, and Erwin Chemerinsky, erstwhile Dean of UC Irvine Law School and current Dean of UC Berkeley School of Law (whom Hewitt calls "The Smart Guys"), James Lileks, Mark Steyn, United States Naval Academy English professor David Allen White (who does a monthly Shakespeare showcase), and Congressman David Dreier (R-CA), as well as frequent callers from around the country. He used to spend the 15th hour of the week discussing movies with "Emmett of the Unblinking Eye".

=== Hugh Hewitt (television) ===
Hugh Hewitt
- Genre: Political news/opinion program
- Presented by: Hugh Hewitt
- Country of origin: United States
- Original language: English

Production
- Running time: 30 minutes

Original release
- Network: MSNBC
- Release: June 24, 2017 – June 30, 2018

On June 24, 2017, Hugh Hewitt debuted, a half-hour television show which ran on MSNBC in the Saturdays 8 am EST timeslot, but it "failed to deliver satisfactory ratings for the network." On Saturday, June 30, 2018, Hewitt announced that the show had been cancelled, but that he would continue his commentary on the NBC family of networks. In 2020, NBC and MSNBC stopped inviting Hewitt to appear on their programs, which constituted a breach of contract. Thus, in 2021, Hewitt was released from that contract and started appearing on Fox News Channel. In November 2024, Hewitt quit his position with The Washington Post following an appearance on the paper's live show.

== Political views ==
Hewitt has described George Will and Charles Krauthammer as models for his style of punditry. Politico described Hewitt as an "ardent Reaganite".

=== Foreign policy ===
In a 2006 interview on CNN with Anderson Cooper, Hewitt said that in regards to George W. Bush's decisions while President, the War in Iraq would go down as "one of the wisest he has made." In regard to the Syrian Civil War, Hewitt stated that President Donald Trump was making a "major error" in deciding to draw down the number of U.S. troops in the country, over seven years after the beginning of the conflict. Hewitt has advocated for increasing the defense budget in the United States, stating that "any Republicans who vote against higher defense spending should be fired."

=== Donald Trump ===
Hewitt moderated several of the 2016 Republican Party presidential debates and forums, where he clashed with Donald Trump. Hewitt said that Trump did not possess "the temperament to be president". In February 2016, Hewitt wrote that, despite being repeatedly publicly insulted by Trump, he would support him should he become the Republican nominee for president. In June 2016, after Trump's controversial remarks concerning Judge Gonzalo Curiel, Hewitt publicly called on the RNC to disendorse Trump as nominee. A week later, Hewitt reversed his position in a Washington Post op-ed. Internal emails showed that a Salem Media executive pressured Hewitt to support Trump, and that the Salem Media executive attributed Hewitt's support for Trump in the aforementioned Washington Post op-ed shortly after to the pressure. Hewitt denied being pressured to change his position on Trump.

On August 3, he publicly floated the idea of replacing Donald with Ivanka Trump on the ticket. On October 8, he called on Trump to drop out of the race after the Access Hollywood tape emerged. Hewitt has said he ultimately voted for Trump.

Hewitt supported Trump's decision to re-shuffle his foreign policy staff in March–April 2018, and place John Bolton and Mike Pompeo in key national security positions. He described John Bolton as "peace-through-strength, 600-ship [navy], Reagan conservative" (as compared to Trump's approach, which Hewitt likened to the Great White Fleet). According to Politico, Hewitt emerged "perhaps the most public advocate for Trump's hawkish new national security team at a time when others, even inside his own party, have voiced increasing fears that Trump is surrounding himself with war-minded hawks who may play to the president's worst instincts."

Amid the Trump–Ukraine scandal, which led to the first impeachment of Donald Trump, Hewitt floated a conspiracy theory that the whistleblower complaint that set off the scandal was by a whistleblower who was trying to divert attention from his own involvement in a "Clintons-Obama-Biden collusion debacle". He penned an op-ed about the impeachment inquiry titled, "Impeachment-minded Democrats, welcome to Al Capone's vault. Look familiar?" He said that the FBI had tried a "coup" against Trump and that Democrats were trying "another coup". He described the July 25 phone call in which Trump requested that Ukrainian president Volodymyr Zelenskyy investigate Joe Biden, a 2020 Democratic presidential candidate, as a "nothingburger".

In October 2019, Hewitt defended Trump's decision to remove a small contingent of U.S. military forces from Northern Syria where they served as a buffer between Turkey and Syrian Kurds, leaving Kurds vulnerable to attack by Turkish forces.

On his podcast on October 24, 2024, Hewitt, in a phone call with Trump, stated that he had voted for Trump for president in 2024.

=== Immigration ===
In a June 2018 interview with then Attorney General Jeff Sessions, Hewitt repeatedly pressed Sessions about the morality of the Trump administration's decision to separate undocumented immigrant children from their parents. Hewitt said, "I don't think children should be separated from biological parents at any age, but especially if they're infants and toddlers. I think it's traumatic and terribly difficult on the child."

== Personal life ==
Hewitt has written several books concerning the Christian faith. He has several times accused the Democratic Party of being anti-religion. He attends church regularly. He is married to Betsy Hewitt, whom he married in 1982. He lives in Virginia with his wife and three children.

== Books ==
- The Queen: The Epic Ambition of Hillary and the Coming of a Second "Clinton Era" (2015, ISBN 1-4555-6251-3)
- The Happiest Life: Seven Gifts, Seven Givers, and the Secret to Genuine Success (2013, ISBN 1-5955-5578-1)
- The Brief Against Obama: The Rise, Fall & Epic Fail of the Hope & Change Presidency (2012, ISBN 1-4555-1630-9)
- The War Against the West: Crucial Conversations with the Most Informed Experts About Our Enemies, Our Defenses, Our Strategy and Our Leaders in the Long War Against Islamist Extremism (2008, ISBN 978-1-60791-069-5)
- A Mormon in the White House?: 10 Things Every American Should Know about Mitt Romney (2007, ISBN 1-59698-502-X)
- A Guide to Christian Ambition: Using Career, Politics, and Culture to Influence the World (2006, ISBN 0-7852-8871-6)
- Painting the Map Red: The Fight to Create a Permanent Republican Majority (2006, ISBN 0-89526-002-6)
- Blog: Understanding the Information Reformation That's Changing Your World (2005, ISBN 0-7852-8804-X)
- If It's Not Close, They Can't Cheat: Crushing the Democrats in Every Election and Why Your Life Depends on It (2004, ISBN 0-7852-6319-5)
- In, But Not Of: A Guide to Christian Ambition (2003, ISBN 0-7852-6395-0)
- The Embarrassed Believer (1998, ISBN 0-8499-1419-1)
- Searching for God in America: The Companion Volume to the Acclaimed TV Series (1996, ISBN 0-7881-9914-5)
- First Principles: A Primer of Ideas for the College-Bound Student (1987, ISBN 0-89526-793-4)
