= JobsNotMobs =

Political slogan

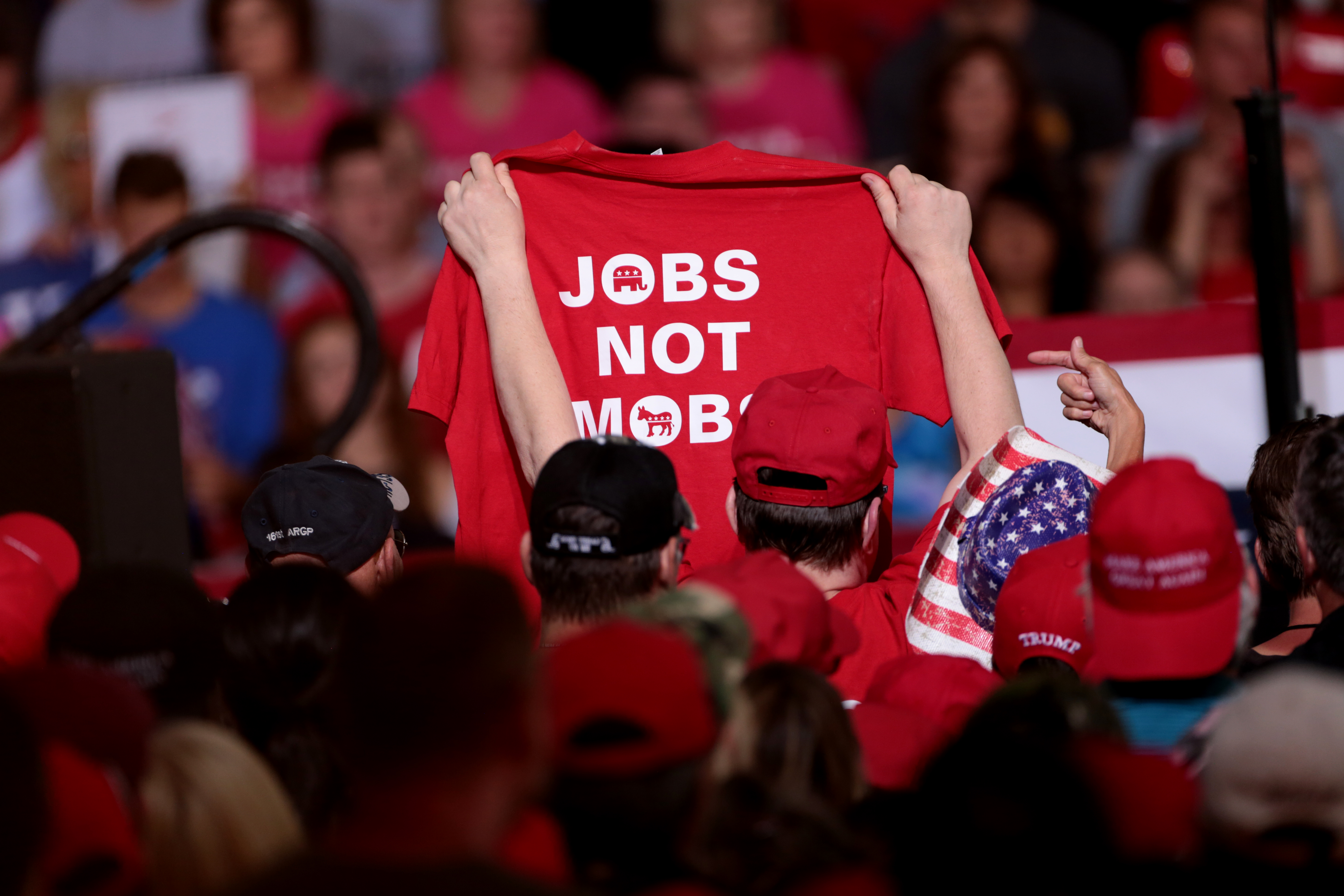
A "Jobs Not Mobs" shirt at a Make America Great Again campaign rally for President of the United States Donald Trump at International Air Response Hangar at Phoenix-Mesa Gateway Airport in Mesa, Arizona, in 2018

JobsNotMobs (or Jobs Not Mobs) is an American campaign slogan, hashtag, and viral video that rose to popularity among Republicans during the 2018 midterm election.

The hashtag was launched by a video that went viral on Twitter on October 11, 2018. According to the New York Times, the video "alternated between footage of angry protesters and clips of cable news anchors discouraging the use of the word “mobs” to describe those activists." The anonymous creator of the Internet meme was described by the New York Times as working under the pen name “Bryan Machiavelli,” and as describing himself as “memetic warfare" consultant who charges $200 per hour. Newsweek quoted him as saying, "I’m someone that works in Hollywood. I am a notable person but because of the state of the climate, I chose to make this video anonymously."

"Mobs" draws on the idea, popular on the right-wing internet, that Republicans represent a rational alternative to the mob violence represented by Antifa and other left-wing protesters. While "Jobs" references the high levels of job creation during the first year and a half of the Trump administration, which many left-wing and liberal voters and commentators attribute less to the policies of the Trump administration and more to a lingering effect of Obama administration policies.

According to Politico, "the seeds of the new slogan" can be traced to early October 2018, a moment when activists flooded into downtown Washington during the confirmation fight over Supreme Court nominee Brett Kavanaugh. President Trump and other Republicans began calling Democrats the party of “mob rule,” and Trump spoke of a “radical Democrat mob,” saying, “You don’t hand matches to an arsonist, and you don’t give power to an angry left-wing mob.” On October 12, Republican political consultant and activist Ali Alexander tweeted that "‘Mob’ probably won't play as well as some proponents think.” Cartoonist and pro-Trump activist Scott Adams responded "‘Mobs’ by itself doesn't work. But ‘Jobs Not Mobs’ is brain glue plus framing and contrast. Science says the brain interprets rhymes as persuasive."

In an email interview with Politico, Adams disclaimed coining the phrase, stating that had seen in a comment on Twitter, though he couldn’t remember where. “This is the sort of meme that likely popped up in multiple places and travelled multiple paths. Expect more than one claim of original authorship. That would be normal and probably true.” According to Politico reporter Ben Schreckinger who tracked the slogan down using a third-party tool, The First Tweet, the first person to use it was probable Danny East, a Twitter user in Georgia who had about 500 followers and who used the phrase on October 11 in response to video of Trump speaking.

Adams popularized the slogan by endorsing it on October 12. The phrase was retweeted by activist Turning Point USA and actor James Woods before being publicized on Fox & Friends on October 15. It was being widely retweeted by 18 October, when President Trump first retweeted it. It continued to grow in popularity in late October, becoming a Republican campaign slogan in the days just before the midterm United States elections, 2018, which resulted in sweeping gains for the Democratic Party.
