= Grand Central Publishing =

Division of Hachette Book Group

- Parent company: Hachette Book Group
- Predecessor: Warner Books; Paperback Library
- Founded: 1970 / 2007
- Country of origin: United States
- Headquarters location: New York City
- Imprints: Balance, Forever/Forever Yours, Legacy Lit, Twelve
- Official website: grandcentralpublishing.com

Grand Central Publishing is a book publishing imprint of Hachette Book Group, originally established in 1970 as Warner Books when Kinney National Company acquired the New York City-based Paperback Library. When Time Warner sold their book publishing business to Hachette Livre in March 2007, the North American operations of the Time Warner Book Group were renamed Hachette Book Group, while the group's Warner Books imprint became Grand Central Publishing, named in part by the proximity of their new offices to New York's Grand Central Terminal.

In addition to the Grand Central imprint itself, Grand Central Publishing has several sub-imprints, including Balance, Forever/Forever Yours, Legacy Lit, and Twelve.

== Twelve ==
Twelve, founded in 2007, is known for releasing only one book per month. The imprint, which is considered "boutique", has published titles by Christopher Hitchens, Benjamin Hale, Daniel Menaker and Ben Schreckinger. Twelve is considered a "prestige publisher".
