= Thanks, Obama =

Internet meme

Thanks, Obama is an Internet meme both genuinely and satirically used in regard to policies pursued by Barack Obama, the President of the United States from 2009 to 2017.

== History ==
Riding Herd
(@ridingherd)
tweeted:

Obamas failure is looking to be so complete he will [hand] the Republicans the white house for another 8 years. #thanksobama #tcot #hcr

Sep 4, 2009

The saying first appeared in 2009 using the hashtag #thanksobama in a tweet about President Obama's policies. Three months later, it was used in a demotivational poster.

Shortly after the Republicans gained control of the House in the U.S. midterm election of 2010, liberals and Democrats repurposed the meme to blame Obama satirically for disparate societal or economic ills. One notable example came in 2012, when a picture of a man spilling food with the "Thanks Obama" caption was popular. In December 2012, the /r/thanksobama subreddit was created.

By 2015, it seemed the meme had run its course after Obama used it in a BuzzFeed video. Obama himself revived it in 2016, using it to poke fun at his critics and to thank a supporter who, during a speech, yelled out at and thanked him for $2 gas.

On the January 19, 2017 episode of The Late Show with Stephen Colbert, Obama's last full day in office, Stephen Colbert's original conservative character from The Colbert Report used the phrase to express gratitude to Obama for helping the Republican Party find a message of united opposition against him and succeed electorally again, only to later plead in fear for Obama to stay in office.

In 2022, the Twitter account for President Joe Biden (who had served as vice president in the Obama administration) posted the phrase in response to a tweet by Obama acknowledging the passage of the Inflation Reduction Act.

== See also ==
- Let's Go Brandon – slogan which similarly gained popular use through viral memes to criticize the presidency of Joe Biden
- List of United States political catchphrases
