= Richard Nixon Foundation =

Non-profit organization in the United States

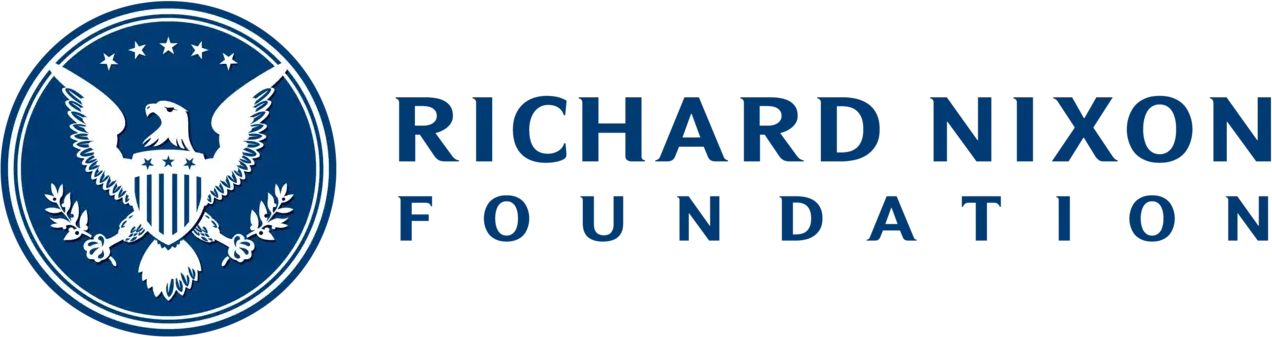
- Formation: January 24, 1983; 43 years ago
- Tax ID no.: 52-1278303
- Headquarters: Richard Nixon Presidential Library and Museum
- Location: Yorba Linda, California, U.S.
- Chairman: Robert C. O'Brien
- President and CEO: Jim Byron
- Revenue: $9,688,165 (2021)
- Website: nixonfoundation.org

The Richard Nixon Foundation is an American not-for-profit organization based at the Richard Nixon Presidential Library and Museum in Yorba Linda, California. It was founded on January 24, 1983 by Richard Nixon, 37th president of the United States, and served as the governing body of the Nixon Library for nearly twenty years.

Since 2007, the Nixon Foundation has operated the Nixon Library in conjunction with the National Archives and Records Administration, which is an entity of the federal government of the United States. The Nixon Foundation carries out additional charitable work and education programs.

== History ==
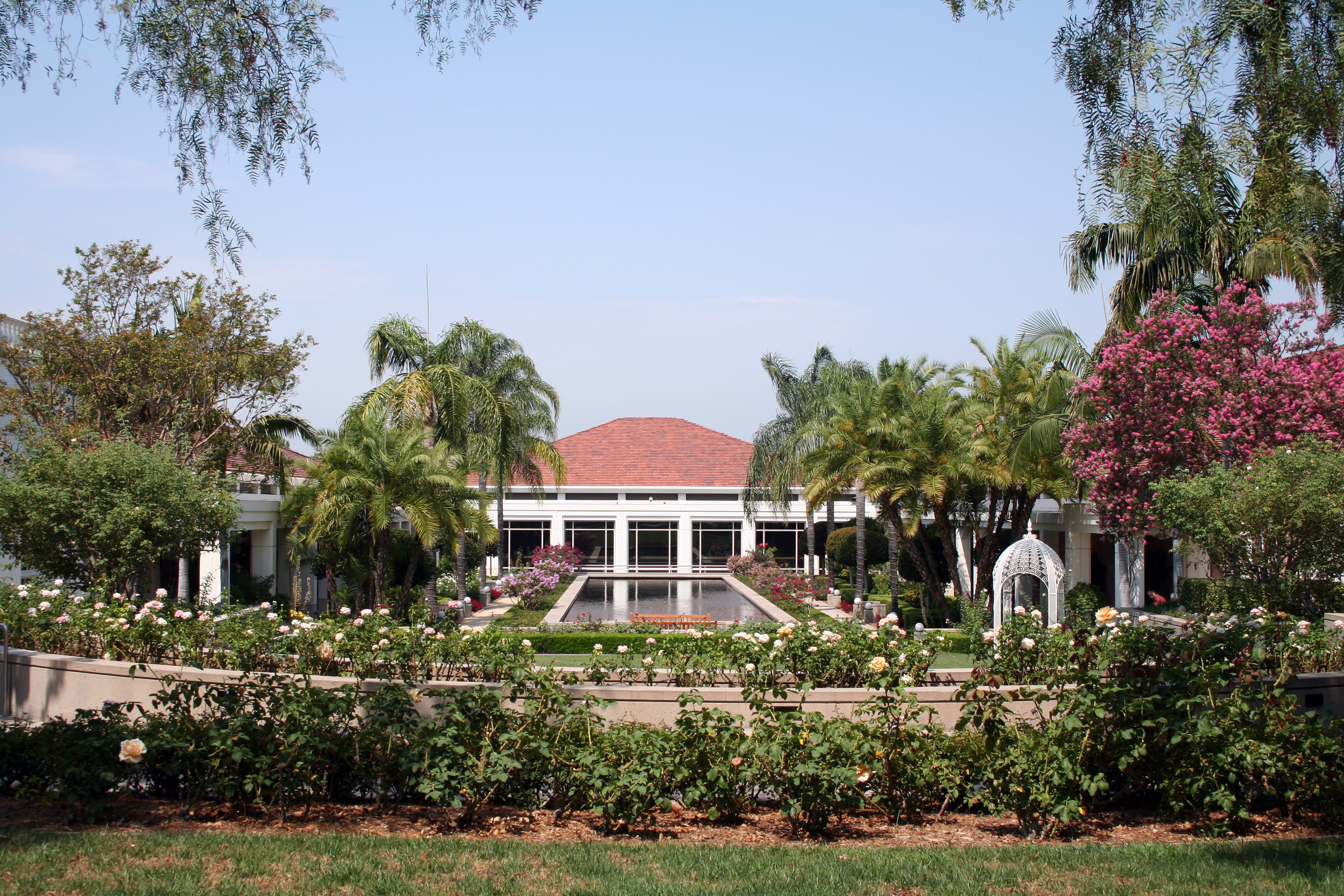
The Nixon Library and Gardens

The Nixon Foundation founded, controlled and operated the Nixon Library from the library's dedication on July 19, 1990 until July 11, 2007, at which the Foundation invited the National Archives to take control. The two entities signed a joint operating agreement which allowed the library to become officially known as the Richard Nixon Presidential Library, welcoming it into the national system of presidential libraries. This move allowed President Nixon's White House documents to be moved to his library in Yorba Linda.

The Nixon Foundation is governed by a board of directors led by Robert C. O'Brien, a former National Security Advisor. The board includes President Nixon's daughters Tricia Nixon Cox and Julie Nixon Eisenhower, former U.S. Ambassador to Spain George Argyros, former California governor Pete Wilson, nationally-syndicated radio host and political commentator Hugh Hewitt, media pundit Monica Crowley, and longest-serving Vietnam War POW Everett Alvarez Jr. In 2021, the Nixon Foundation board of directors named Jim Byron, a 28-year-old executive at the Nixon Foundation, as its president and CEO. Byron took a leave of absence in 2025 to manage the National Archives and Records Administration and Joe Lopez, the Nixon Foundation’s Vice President of Marketing and Communications, is Acting President and CEO.

The Foundation has hosted United States presidents, first ladies and several vice presidents. Also hosted have been public affairs commentators such as Bill O'Reilly, academics such as Doris Kearns Goodwin, and Supreme Court Justice Stephen Breyer.

The library includes "Meet the Presidents," in which presidential impersonators speak to several hundred school-aged children. To commemorate the 10th anniversary of the September 11 attacks, the Nixon Foundation brought 16 tons of warped steel from the World Trade Center and a damaged engine from the New York City Fire Department for a display at the Nixon Library.

Before the National Archives took over its management, the Nixon Library had been accused by several media outlets of glossing over Nixon's 1974 resignation with "whitewashed" exhibits. In 2007, the National Archives removed the 17-year-old Watergate exhibit and, after three years, the new exhibit was scheduled to open in July 2010. The Nixon Foundation objected to the proposed exhibit, because the Nixon Foundation was not consulted in the way that other presidential foundations had been consulted with similar situations. The Foundation filed a 158-page memorandum to the Assistant Archivist for Presidential Libraries expressing their dissatisfaction and NARA stated a committee would review the objection but gave no timeline for when that process would be concluded. The exhibit opened on March 31, 2011.
