= Nothingburger =

Slang term

A literal "nothing burger"

Nothingburger, sometimes spelled as nothing-burger or nothing burger, is a term used to describe a situation that receives a lot of attention, but which, upon closer examination, proves to be of little to no real significance. The phrase refers to the notion that a regular hamburger should have different flavorful ingredients, but if the meat were to be removed, all that would be left would be a "nothingburger", thus many ingredients might be on the outside, but upon further inspection on the inside, nothing remains.

== History ==
The term "nothingburger" was first coined in the 1950s by Hollywood gossip columnist Louella Parsons, and has a history of use in United States political circles, especially within the Capital Beltway in Washington, D.C. The term reached its peak usage, especially among U.S. political circles, in the late 2010s. In 2017, U.S. Senator Ted Cruz used the word in response to questions around then–U.S. Attorney General Jeff Sessions, saying: "The underlying meeting is a nothingburger. It's what senators do every day, meeting with foreign ambassadors. That's part of the job." Later in the same year, ex–U.S. Secretary of State Hillary Clinton called the investigation into her email server the "biggest nothing-burger ever", and CNN commentator Van Jones described the allegations of collusion between Russia and U.S. President Donald Trump as a "nothingburger" in a covertly recorded conversation.

The Oxford English Dictionary was reported by the BBC to have added "nothingburger" as a valid word to its dictionary as recently as 2018. It defined the word thus: "Nothingburger is a way of describing someone or something seen to have little importance." As of 2023, the Merriam-Webster dictionary, which focuses on American English usage, had not yet included nothingburger as a valid word to be defined in its dictionaries, but has a page dedicated to monitoring the word and is considering the word for inclusion potentially in the future.

Spelling variations also exist, with no apparent consensus regarding spelling. All variants, including "nothingburger", "nothing burger", "no thing burger", or the hyphenated "nothing-burger", have appeared in press and in social media usage by popular and political figures.

== See also ==
- Make a mountain out of a molehill
- Where's the beef?
