= Ben Schreckinger =

American journalist and writer

- Born: 1989 or 1990 (age 36–37); Belmont, Massachusetts, U.S.
- Education: Brown University (BA)
- Occupations: Journalist, author, national political correspondent
- Employer: Politico Magazine
- Works: The Bidens: Inside the First Family's Fifty-Year Rise to Power (2021)

Ben Schreckinger (born c. 1990) is an American journalist and writer. He is a national political correspondent for Politico Magazine and author of The Bidens: Inside the First Family’s Fifty-Year Rise to Power— a book on the life of U.S. President Joe Biden.

== Early life and education ==
Schreckinger is from Belmont, Massachusetts. He attended Brown University, where he studied classics and graduated with a Bachelor of Arts in 2012. As a student, he was Editor-in-Chief of The Brown Daily Herald. Later he freelanced as a ghostwriter for a consultancy's blog, for The Boston Globe, and for Boston Magazine.

== Career ==
Politico was Schreckinger's first full-time job following his education at Brown University. He has also written for Salon, The Financial Times, The Atlantic, The Boston Globe and for GQ.

Jonathan Greenblatt of the Anti-Defamation League said that a 2017 article on Trump and Putin by Schreckinger it "evokes age-old myths about Jews". In March and June 2016, Schreckinger was denied entry to or ejected from then-candidate and future U.S. President Trump events he was covering at the time. In the latter case, Schreckinger had entered using a general admission ticket, not a press pass, so a security guard removed him. In the summer of 2019, Schreckinger reported on bias at the Southern Poverty Law Center.

In November 2020, Schreckinger signed a contract with Twelve to write his The Bidens book; upon its 2021 publication, Bret Stephens characterized it in The New York Times as "scrupulously reported". That same year, Brown Political Review reported Schreckinger was the first reporter by a "reputable news organization" to confirm some of the emails in the Hunter Biden laptop story. A Biden campaign spokesman described one of Schreckinger's articles about a property transaction conducted by one of Biden's brothers as "an absolute joke."

== Books ==
- The Bidens: Inside the First Family's Fifty-Year Rise to Power. Little, Brown and Company. 2021. ISBN 9781538738009.

== Awards ==
Year	Award	Category	Result	Ref.
2011	The Fund for American Studies Award	Outstanding Reporting	Won	
2021	National Headliner Award	Best Magazine Column	Won	
