= The wrong war, at the wrong place, at the wrong time =

American political catchphrase

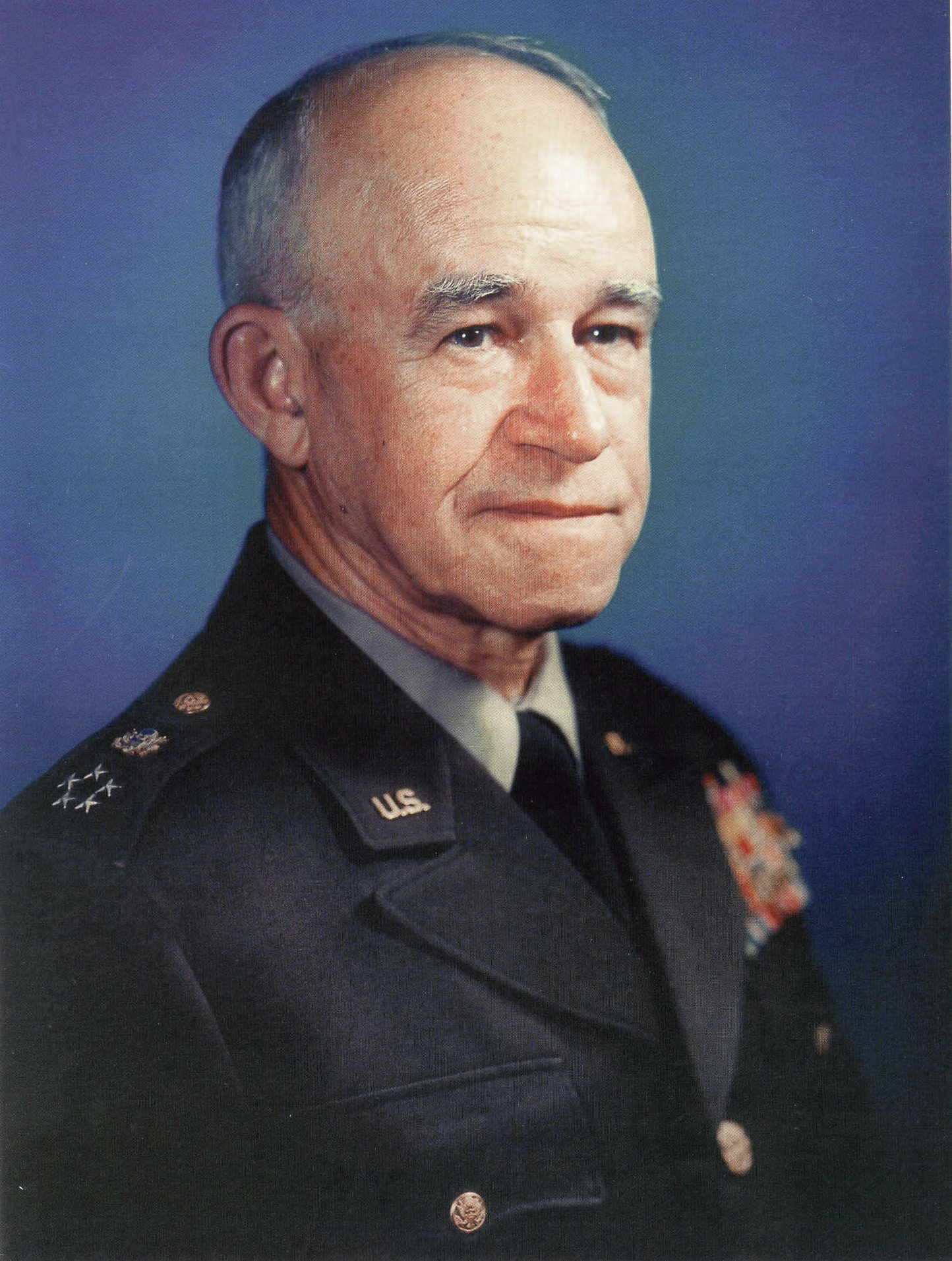
Bradley in 1950

"The wrong war, at the wrong place, at the wrong time, and with the wrong enemy" is General Omar Bradley's famous rebuke in his May 15, 1951 Congressional testimony as the Chairman of the Joint Chiefs of Staff to the idea of extending the Korean War into China, as proposed by General Douglas MacArthur, the commander of the U.N. forces in Korea before being relieved of command by President Harry Truman on April 11, 1951.

== Passages from testimony ==
Here is a more complete passage of Bradley's testimony:

I am under no illusion that our present strategy of using means short of total war to achieve our ends and oppose communism is a guarantee that a world war will not be thrust upon us. But a policy of patience and determination without provoking a world war, while we improve our military power, is one which we believe we must continue to follow….

Under present circumstances, we have recommended against enlarging the war from Korea to also include Red China. The course of action often described as a limited war with Red China would increase the risk we are taking by engaging too much of our power in an area that is not the critical strategic prize.

Red China is not the powerful nation seeking to dominate the world. Frankly, in the opinion of the Joint Chiefs of Staff, this strategy would involve us in the wrong war, at the wrong place, at the wrong time, and with the wrong enemy.

— From testimony before the Senate Committees on Armed Services and Foreign Relations, May 15, 1951.—Military Situation in the Far East, hearings, 82d Congress, 1st session, part 2, pp. 731-32 (1951).

== Vietnam War usage ==
Presidential candidate John F. Kennedy echoed Bradley's sentiments in a speech given on October 12, 1960:

Should I become your President... I will not risk American lives and a nuclear war by permitting any other nation to drag us into the wrong war at the wrong place at the wrong time through an unwise commitment that is unwise militarily, unnecessary to our security and unsupported by our allies.

== Iraq War usage ==
The quotation has since been used to criticize the planning and execution of the 2003 U.S. invasion of Iraq and the subsequent occupation. General Anthony Zinni, historian Arthur Schlesinger, Jr., and Governor Howard Dean have all used variations of the phrase in criticism of the Bush administration's handling of the Iraq war. Notably, Schlesinger also reported contemporaneously on Bradley's original statement back in 1951 in his book The General and the President, and the Future of American Foreign Policy. Despite voting yes on the Authorization to Use Military Force on Iraq and not reversing his position at any time before the invasion, on September 6, 2004, at a Racine, West Virginia rally, Senator John Kerry said,

I would not have done just one thing differently than the president on Iraq, I would have done everything differently than the president on Iraq…. You've about 500 troops here, 500 troops there and it's American troops that are 90 percent of the combat casualties and it's American taxpayers that are paying 90 percent of the cost of the war. It's the wrong war, in the wrong place at the wrong time.

Speaking on 60 Minutes, May 23, 2004, Zinni said, "The plan was wrong, it was the wrong war, the wrong place and the wrong time— with little or no planning." He stated that serious "derelictions of duty," "criminal negligence," and poor planning put U.S. forces in harm's way and left Iraq in chaos after the invasion. He also said that Paul Bremer had made "mistake after mistake after mistake."

In The Independent, April 15, 2004, Arthur Schlesinger, Jr. wrote:

The immediate reason that Mr Bush opened Pandora's box in the Middle East and invaded Iraq was his moral certitude that Saddam Hussein had weapons of mass destruction and that he was working in close partnership with Osama bin Laden and al-Qa'ida. Those convictions turned out to be delusions. This denouement does great harm to Mr Bush's credibility and to that of the United States; it has got us into a ghastly mess in Iraq; and it has diverted attention, resources and military might from the war that should have commanded the Bush administration's highest priority - the Afghan war against al-Qa'ida and international terrorism. Meanwhile Afghanistan is a mess too. Mr Bush chose the wrong war in the wrong place at the wrong time.

On December 15, 2003, at the Pacific Council on International Policy in Los Angeles, Howard Dean said Bush "launched the war in the wrong way, at the wrong time, with inadequate planning, insufficient help, and at unbelievable cost." In a May 3, 2003 primary debate in South Carolina, Dean said:

Let me be very clear about what I believe. I'm delighted to see Saddam Hussein gone. I appreciate the fact that we have a strong military in this country, and I'd keep a strong military in this country, but I think this was the wrong war at the wrong time because we have set a new policy of preventive war in this country, and I think that was the wrong thing to do because sooner or later we're going to see another country copy the United States, and sooner or later we're going to have to deal with the fact that there may well be a Shia fundamentalist regime set up in Iraq which will be a greater danger to the United States than Iraq is.

=== 2004 Presidential debate ===
During the first Presidential debate of 2004, George W. Bush repeatedly rebuked John Kerry for using Bradley's saying, asking, "what kind of message does it say" to U.S. troops and allies. Speaking of other world leaders, Bush said "They're not going to follow somebody who says, 'This is the wrong war at the wrong place at the wrong time.'" Bush recited versions of the quotation seven times, three times in one response.

== Other usage ==
In 2015, Ugandan President Yoweri Museveni described the South Sudanese Civil War as "the wrong war in the wrong place at the wrong time." He also referred to Bradley's use of the phrase in his Independence Day speech in October 2023, underlining his criticism of imperialist actors.
