= It's the economy, stupid =

Phrase from the 1992 US presidential campaign

"It's the economy, stupid" is a catchphrase emphasizing that the primary concern of American voters is the state of the American economy, and how the economy affects their personal finances.

The phrase was coined by James Carville in 1992 as "The economy, stupid". It is often quoted from a televised quip by Carville as "It's the economy, stupid". Carville worked as a strategist in Bill Clinton's successful campaign in the 1992 U.S. presidential election against incumbent George H. W. Bush. His phrase was directed at the campaign's workers and intended as one of three messages for them to focus on. The others were "Change vs. more of the same" and "Don't forget health care".

Clinton's campaign advantageously used the then-prevailing recession in the United States as one of the campaign's means to successfully unseat George H. W. Bush. In March 1991, days after the ground war in Kuwait, 90% of polled Americans approved of President Bush's job performance. During the following year, Americans' opinions turned sharply; 64% of polled Americans disapproved of Bush's job performance in August 1992.

== History ==
In order to keep the campaign on message, Carville hung a sign in Bill Clinton's Little Rock campaign headquarters that read:

1. Change vs. more of the same.
2. The economy, stupid.
3. Don't forget health care.

Although the sign was intended for an internal audience of campaign workers, the second phrase became a de facto slogan for the Clinton election campaign.

== Legacy ==
The phrase has become a snowclone repeated often in American political culture, usually starting with the word "it's" and with commentators sometimes using a different word in place of "economy". Examples include "It's the deficit, stupid!", "It's the corporation, stupid!", "It's the math, stupid!", and "It's the voters, stupid!" Judge Mark E. Walker wrote, "It's the First Amendment, stupid", in a decision regarding a case between Florida Department of Health officials and the abortion rights advocates Floridians Protecting Freedom after the department filed cease-and-desist letters against television stations that aired an advertisement produced by the group. The political scientist Cas Mudde wrote a chapter entitled "It's not the economy, stupid!" in his 2007 book Populist Radical Right Parties in Europe when discussing causes of the rise of far-right parties in Europe.

== See also ==
- List of United States political catchphrases
- The War Room
- Keep it simple, stupid
