= U.S. Business Hall of Fame =

The Global Business Hall of Fame, powered by JA Worldwide, was established by Junior Achievement in 1975 as the U.S. Business Hall of Fame, the result of an idea by Willard F. Rockwell, Jr. (former chairman and CEO of Rockwell International) and Alan Hilburg (assisting W. F. Rockwell as a representative of Junior Achievement). Rockwell and Hilburg approached Pat Lenahan and Charles Whittingham (publisher and associate publisher of Fortune magazine) with the idea. Together they engaged the Board of Editors of Fortune to independently select the honorees. The originating idea was to align the principles of Junior Achievement with the lives of the inductees to promote examples of what it considers exemplary business leadership.

The U.S. Business Hall of Fame did not induct any new laureates from 2009 to 2019, when it was resurrected by the global Junior Achievement organization, JA Worldwide, and renamed the Global Business Hall of Fame, which seeks to be more global and more gender-balanced in its laureates going forward, in order to serve as a role model for young entrepreneurs. The Global Business Hall of Fame nomination process has been designed, with support from PwC, to engage diverse stakeholders from around the world and to ensure protocols are followed in the selection of laureates. Nominees are vetted throughout the process by two committees and final voting jury.

== Location ==
The Business Hall of Fame, previously exhibited at the Museum of Science and Industry in Chicago, Illinois, US., is a virtual, online hall of fame, accessible from anywhere in the world at https://businesshalloffame.org.

== Inductees ==
More than 270 laureates, made up of accomplished global businesspeople and entrepreneurs, have been inducted into the Global Business Hall of Fame, with four new laureates added in 2020.
