= Where's the beef? =

1984 American advertising catchphrase

The picture sleeve of a "Where's the Beef?" single, recorded by Coyote McCloud and Clara Peller, based on her advertisement catchphrase

"Where's the beef?" is a catchphrase in the United States and Canada, introduced as a slogan for the fast food chain Wendy's in 1984. Since then it has become an all-purpose phrase questioning the substance of an idea, event, or product.

== History ==
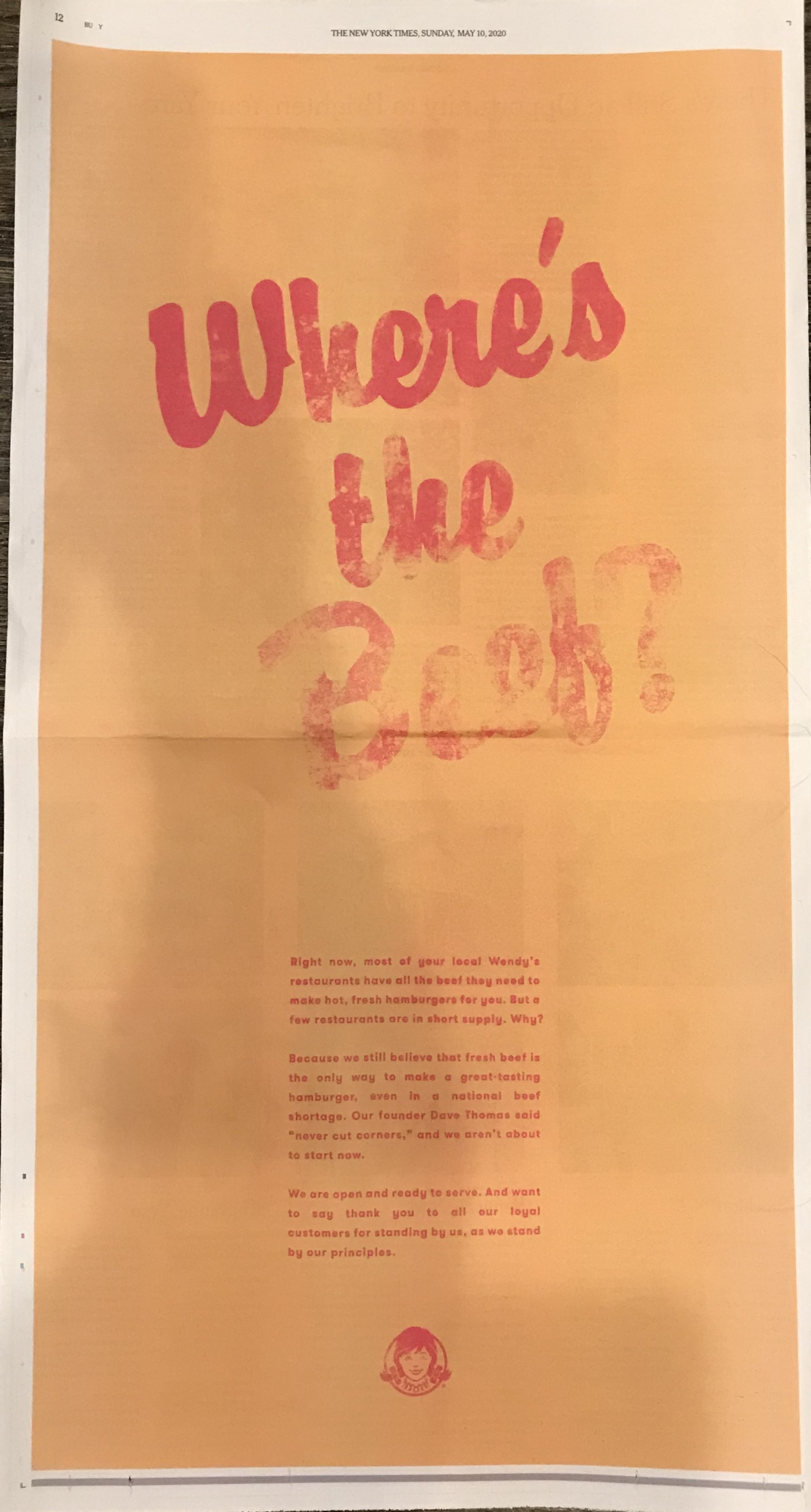
2020 Where's the Beef ad

The phrase first came to the public audience in an American television commercial for the Wendy's chain of hamburger restaurants in 1984. The strategy behind the campaign was to distinguish competitors' (McDonald's and Burger King) big name hamburgers (Big Mac and Whopper respectively) from Wendy's "modest" Single by focusing on the large bun used by the competitors and the larger beef patty in Wendy's hamburger.

In the ad, titled "Fluffy Bun", an elderly woman, played by actress Clara Peller, receives a burger with a large bun but a comically small patty from a fictional competitor, which uses the slogan "Home of the Big Bun". The small patty angers the woman, who exclaims "Where's the beef?"

Director Joe Sedelmaier actually wanted Peller to say, "Where is all the beef?" but Peller was unable to say the original line due to emphysema.

The commercial was originally supposed to star a young couple, but Sedelmaier did not find the concept funny and changed it to the elderly women.

An earlier version, featuring a middle-aged bald man saying, "Thanks, but where's the beef?", failed to make much impact. After the Peller version, the catchphrase was repeated in television shows, films, magazines, and other media outlets.

Still earlier was a similar commercial Sedelmaier produced in 1979 for the small Milwaukee-based chain Suburpia, titlted "Clown", showing a man looking at a nearly identical tiny patty in a big bun and saying "Where's the meat?" and "Where's my meat?"

First airing in 1984, the original commercial featured three elderly women at the "Home of the Big Bun" examining an exaggeratedly large hamburger bun. The other two women poke at it, exchanging bemused comments ("It certainly is a big bun. It's a very big bun. It's a big fluffy bun. It's a very big fluffy—"). As one of the women lifts the top half of the bun, a comically minuscule hamburger patty with cheese and a pickle is revealed (prompting her to finish the sentence "—bun." with a much more disappointed tone). Peller immediately responds with her outraged, irascible question.

Sequels featured Peller yelling at a Fluffy Bun executive from his yacht over the phone and approaching fast food drive-up windows (including the "Home of the Big Bun" and a restaurant with a golden arch) that were slammed down before she could complete the line.

To capitalize on the popularity of the ad campaign, Wendy's asked songwriter and Nashville DJ Coyote McCloud to write a song of the same name.

The advertising campaign ended in 1985 after Peller performed in a commercial for Prego pasta sauce, saying "I found it, I really found it", a phrase alluding to the beef in the listener's mind.

There were many "Where's the beef?" promotional items, including bumper stickers, frisbees, clothing patches, a Milton Bradley game, and more.

In 2011, Wendy's revived the phrase for its new ad campaign, finally answering its own question with "Here's the beef".

During the COVID-19 pandemic in the United States in 2020, when stores were experiencing a shortage of beef, Wendy's revived the ad.

To launch their new breakfast menu in Canada, Wendy's released a new advertisement campaign called "Where's the Bacon?" as a callback to the "Where's the Beef?" campaign. The new campaign is similar to its older counterpart, except it focuses on the amount of bacon in breakfast sandwiches rather than beef size.

For the 2023 Daytona 500, Legacy Motor Club driver Noah Gragson, sponsored by Wendy's, uses the No. 42 Chevrolet Camaro carrying "The Beef" on the hood, and a video released by the team featured Gragson using the phrase in the promotional video.

== Credits ==
William Welter, the executive vice president of Wendy's International, led the marketing team at the time of the campaign. The commercial was directed by Joe Sedelmaier as part of a campaign by the advertising agency Dancer Fitzgerald Sample. It was written by Cliff Freeman. The marketing and promotion campaign were created by Alan Hilburg and the Burson-Marsteller team under the direction of Denny Lynch, the vice president of corporate communications at Wendy's.

== Use in politics ==
=== 1984 Democratic presidential primaries ===
The phrase became associated with the 1984 United States presidential election. During primaries in the spring of 1984, when the commercial was at its height of popularity, Democratic candidate and former Vice President Walter Mondale used the phrase to sum up his arguments that program policies championed by his rival, Senator Gary Hart, were insubstantial, beginning with a March 11, 1984, televised debate at the Fox Theatre in Atlanta prior to the New York and Pennsylvania primaries.

Hart had moved his candidacy from dark horse to the lead over Mondale based on allegedly superficial similarities to John F. Kennedy, and his repeated use of the phrase "new ideas". When Hart once again used the slogan in the debate, Mondale leaned forward and said, "When I hear your new ideas, I'm reminded of that ad, 'Where's the beef?'" Subsequently, the two campaigns continually clashed using the two dueling slogans, Hart frequently showing reams of policy papers and retorting "Here's the beef." Mondale's strategy succeeded in casting doubt on Hart's new ideas, and changing the debate to specific details, earning him the Democratic presidential nomination.

== See also ==
- Nothingburger
- Smashburger
