= List of female archivists =

This is a list of female archivists.

Name	Description	Birth	Death	Image
Marguerite-Françoise-Émilie d’Hôtel, Madame de Calonne	French archivist at the Tribunal of Seine (France)	1721	1812	
Adelaide Fries	American historian	1871	1949	
Vicenta Ibáñez Sarsuela	First female archivist at the Archive of the Kingdom of Valencia (Spain)	?	1681	
Adrienne Thomas	American archivist			
Alice Prochaska	Curator, archivist, librarian, and university administrator	1947-07-12		
Anita Wilson	Archivist for Tuvalu, Hong Kong Government and British royal family	1943	2006	
Barbara Frale	Italian historian	1970-02-24		
Bep Bijtelaar	Dutch archivist	1898	1978	
Beryl Oliver	British humanitarian	1882-08-20	1972-07-13	
Brenda Banks	American archivist	1950	2016-07-25	
Camille Billops	African American sculptor, filmmaker, printmaker	1933-08-12		
Christina Kenworthy-Browne	Roman Catholic Religious Sister and historian			
Dorothy Owen	British archivist and historian	1920-04-11	2002-02-13	
Edith Ditmas	Archivist, historian, and writer	1896	1986-02-28	
Édith Thomas	French novelist, archivist, historian and journalist	1909-01-23	1970-12-07	
Elaine Didier	Director of Ford library and museum	1948-01-01		
Elena Amat Calderón	Spanish university professor and archivist	1910-01-13	2006-08-04	
Elisabeth Förster-Nietzsche	Sister of Friedrich Nietzsche, creator of the Nietzsche Archive	1846-07-10	1935-11-08	
Elizabeth Heaps	British librarian			
Francesca Hillier	British archivist			
Gabrielle Enthoven	English playwright, amateur actress, theatre archivist, and prolific collector of theatrical ephemera relating to the London stage	1868-01-12	1950-08-18	
Gladys Esther Tormes González	Puerto Rican historian	1933-09-19		
Helen Willa Samuels	American archivist	1943		
Helena Polaczkówna	Polish archivist	1881	1942	
Hermine Moquette	Dutch archivist	1869-04-25	1945-12-17	
Isabella Henriette van Eeghen	Dutch art historian	1913-02-03	1996-11-26	
Jehanne Wake	British biographer and historian			
Joan Sinar	English archivist	1925-06-01	2015-01-18	
Julie Buck	American film producer, photographer and filmmaker	1974-12-09		
Lilli Gjerløw	Norwegian archivist	1910-06-19	1998-12-04	
Lucie Favier	French archivist	1932-08-04	2003-05-01	
Margaret Cross Norton	First Illinois State Archivist	1891-07-07	1984-05-21	
Margaret Gowing	English historian	1921-04-26	1998-11-07	
Margaret Hedstrom	American archivist	1953-07-28		
Margaret M. H. Finch	American archivist and genealogist	1878-01-06	1958-08-03	
Margaret Storrs Grierson	Founder and first director, Sophia Smith Collection, Smith College	1900-06-27	1997-12-12	
Maria Polaczkówna	Polish state archivist	1878	1944	
Maria Verger	Spanish archivist	1892	1983	
Marie Under	Estonian poet	1883-03-27	1980-09-25	
Marie-Anne Chabin	French archivist	1959		
Marion Stokes	Television producer, Archivist	1929-11-25	2012-12-14	
Martha Levisman	Argentine architect	1933		
Marthe Gosteli	Swiss archivist	1917-12-22	2017-04-07	
Mary Ritter Beard	Historian, writer, activist	1876-08-05	1958-08-14	
Megan Prelinger	American historian	1967-09-25		
Michelle Caswell	American archivist and academic			
Norah Story	Canadian archivist	1902	1978-03-05	
Pauline Schultz	American historian	1915-06-07	2011-10-30	
Soemartini	Chief of the National Archives of Indonesia	1930-08-17	2017-12-26	
Phyllis Blakeley	Canadian archivist	1922-08-02	1986-10-25	
R. J. Mitchell	British writer and archivist	1902		
Renate Drucker	German historian and archivist	1917-07-11	2009-10-23	
Rinskje Visscher	Dutch archivist and first female archivist in the country	1868-12-10	1950-03-26	
Rosalie B. Green	American archivist	1917-08-20	2012-02-24	
Sara Dunlap Jackson	American archivist	1919-05-28	1991-04-19	
Sarah Tyacke	British historian and archivist	1945-09-29		
Shelley Sweeney	Canadian archivist	1959		
Stella Rimington	Director General of MI5; spy fiction writer	1935-05-13		
Phyllis Mander-Jones	Australian archivist			
Trudy Huskamp Peterson	American archivist	1945-01-25		
Virginia C. Purdy	American archivist and historian	1922	2015	
Yvonne Bezard	French archivist	1893-12-08	1939-03-30	
Gladys Hansen	American archivist, expert on the 1906 San Francisco earthquake	1925	2017-03-05	
Meredith Evans	American archivist, Jimmy Carter Presidential Library and Museum director	1926		
Simone Berbain	French historian and archivist	1915-01-31	1949-11-21	
Marie-Louise Marchand-Thébault	French archivist		2007	
Judith Hornabrook	Chief Archivist of New Zealand, 1972-1982	1928	2011	Portrait of Judith Hornabrook and Owen Davie
Anahera Morehu	Chief Archivist of New Zealand, 2023-			Portrait of Anahera Morehu
Barbara L. Craig	Canadian archivist and educator	1943		
Tonia Sutherland	American archivist, educator, and Black archival studies expert			
Shelley Sweeney	Canadian archivist	1959		
Louise Gagnon-Arguin	Canadian archivist	1941		
Joan Ringelheim	American archivist and Research Director, United States Holocaust Memorial Museum	1939	2021	

== See also ==
- List of archivists
- List of female librarians
- Lists of women
