= List of archivists =

This is a list of archivists. An archivist is an information professional who assesses, collects, organizes, preserves, maintains control over, and provides access to records and archives determined to have long-term value. Some of the people listed here were not professional but amateur archivists, although their archivist activities preserved large amounts or important data.

== Archivists ==
Image	Name	Birth date	Death date	Country	Archivist activity
	Absar Ahmed	May 19, 1988	-	Pakistan	Archivist of Pakistani national songs from 1945 to present.
	Joaquín Albareda y Ramoneda	February 16, 1892	July 19, 1966	Spain	Archivist of Montserrat monastery and Prefect of the Vatican Library from 1936 to 1962.
	Henri d'Arbois de Jubainville	December 5, 1827	February, 1910	France	Worked at the departmental archives of Aube.
	Olga Dmitrievna Bagalei-Tatarinova	1890	1942	Ukraine	Saved Kharkiv library assets from Nazis
	Robert-Henri Bautier	April 19, 1922	October 19, 2010	France	Worked at the Archives nationales.
	Bep Bijtelaar	1898	1978	Netherlands	Saved Old Church artifacts from Nazis
	Baldassarre Bonifacio	January 5, 1585	November 17, 1659	Italy	
	Henri Bourde de La Rogerie	April 8, 1873	January 31, 1949	France	
	Charles Braibant	March 31, 1889	April 23, 1976	France	
	Marcel Caya			Canada	Head of Records Management and Archives program at the Université du Québec à Montréal.
	Marie-Anne Chabin	October 17, 1959		France	
	Émile Campardon	July 7, 1837	February 23, 1915	France	
	Armand-Gaston Camus	April 2, 1740	November 2, 1804	France	
	Paul Conway	September 7, 1953		United States	Worked at the Gerald R. Ford Presidential Library and for the Society of American Archivists. He has published extensively on library preservation and conservation issues.
	Terry Cook	June 6, 1947	May 12, 2014	Canada	Author and theorist. Worked at the Library and Archives Canada and taught at the University of Manitoba.
	Barbara L. Craig			Canada	Author and educator. Former university archivist at York University and instructor at University of Toronto Faculty of Information.
	Pierre Claude François Daunou	August 18, 1761	June 20, 1840	France	
	Robin Darwall-Smith			United Kingdom	Oxford University College archivist.
	Arthur Doughty	March 22, 1860	December 1, 1936	Canada	Dominion Archivist and Keeper of the Public Records.
	Jennifer Douglas			Canada	Professor, University of British Columbia iSchool
	Jules Doinel	December 8, 1842	March 16 or 17, 1903	France	
	Luciana Duranti			Canada	Archival theorist. Helped develop theory of the archival bond.
	Terry Eastwood	1943		Canada	
	Jean Favier	April 2, 1932	August 12, 2014	France	
	Lucie Favier	August 4, 1932	October 19, 2003	France	
	Charles Bruce Fergusson	February 14, 1911	September 20, 1978	Canada	Provincial Archivist of Nova Scotia (1956–1977)
	David Ferriero	December 31, 1945		United States	Archivist of the United States
	Margaret M. H. Finch	January 6, 1878	August 3, 1958	United States	Specialized in the US Revolutionary War and War of 1812 pension and bounty-land records.
	Helen Forde			United Kingdom	
	Robert Fruin	November 11, 1823	January 29, 1899	Netherlands	
	Léon Gautier	August 8, 1832	August 25, 1897	France	
	Arthur Giry	February 29, 1848	November 13, 1899	France	
	Henny Glarbo	October 12, 1884	September 9, 1955	Denmark	Development of cultural, theatrical and private archives at the Danish National Archives
	David B. Gracy II	October 25, 1941		United States	Worked at the Texas State Archives and taught at the University of Texas at Austin. He also published extensively on Texas history.
	Marie-Claude Guigue	October 16, 1832	February 8, 1889	France	
	Verne Harris			South Africa	
	Michael S. Hart	March 8, 1947	September 6, 2011	United States	Father of e-book and founder of Project Gutenberg.
	Kent Haworth	1946	2003	Canada	Contributor to establishment of the Rules for Archival Description (RAD), descriptive standard used in Canada
Cropped portrait of Judith Hornabrook	Judith Hornabrook	October 26, 1928	July 3, 2011	New Zealand	Chief Archivist of New Zealand (1972–1982)
	J. Franklin Jameson	September 19, 1859	September 28, 1937	United States	
	Hilary Jenkinson	November 1, 1882	March 5, 1961	United Kingdom	
	Stella Maude Jones	January 12, 1889	January 24, 1955	Territory of Hawaii	First official archivist for the Territory of Hawaii starting in 1931
	Phyllis Mander-Jones	January 2, 1896	February 19, 1984	Australia	State Librarian, New South Wales, known for her work with promoting and establishing a separate archives association in Australia and for her work on the Australian Joint Copying Project
	Brewster Kahle	October 22, 1960		United States	Founder of Internet Archive. (See TED Talk: A free digital library)
	Rita Keegan	1949		United States	Founder of Women Artists of Colour Index at the Women Artists' Slide Library and former Director of the African and Asian Visual Arts Archive
	Arthur de La Borderie	October 5, 1827	February 17, 1901	France	
	William Kaye Lamb	1904	1999	Canada	Dominion Archivist of Canada (1948–1953?), first National Librarian of Canada from 1953-1967.
	Gustave Lanctot			Canada	
	Charles-Victor Langlois			France	
	Henri Langlois	November 13, 1914	January 13, 1977	France	French film archivist and cinephile. A pioneer of film preservation, Langlois was an influential figure in the history of cinema.
	Abel Lefranc			France	
	Waldo Gifford Leland			United States	
	David Lemieux	November 8, 1970		Canada	Archivist (audio/video) for the Grateful Dead rock band
	Mollie Lukis	August 13, 1912	August 1, 2009	Australia	First State Archivist in Western Australia
	Heather MacNeil			Canada	Archival theorist. Helped develop theory of the archival bond.
	Joseph Marmette			Canada	
	Paul Mawhinney			United States	He collected vinyl records. When the collection grew up to thousands, he created the shop Record-Rama. Then, he started to archive a copy of every sold album. In 2003, his music archive held 2 million items, twice the size of the Library of Congress similar collection. When the store was closed in 2008, there were 3 million items. (See documentary: The Archive)
	Sue McKemmish			Australia	Co-founder of the Records Continuum Research Group and academic at Monash University (Professor) in archival systems. Contributed to the development of the Records Continuum Model
	Hermine Moquette	April 25, 1869	December 17, 1945	Netherlands	Rotterdam Municipal Archives
	Anahera Morehu			New Zealand	Chief Archivist of New Zealand (2023–)
	P. K. Nair	April 6, 1933	March 4, 2016	India	Indian film archivist and film scholar, who was the founder and director of the National Film Archive of India (NFAI) in 1964.
	Malcolm Neesam	June 28, 1946	June 28, 2022	United Kingdom	Archivist for the Duchy of Lancaster, and co-creator of the Walker-Neesam archive of research papers at the Mercer Art Gallery, Harrogate, England.
	Margaret Cross Norton			United States	Co-founder of the Society of American Archivists
	Mary Ellis Peltz	May 4, 1896	October 24, 1981	United States	creator of Opera News, and founder of the Metropolitan Opera archives
	Juan Menéndez Pidal			Spain	
	Régine Pernoud			France	Worked at the Archives nationales in Paris
	Seymour Pomrenze			United States	First director of the Offenbach Archival Depot
	Ernst Posner			United States	
	Mila Rechcigl			United States	Archivist of the Czechoslovak Society of Arts and Sciences (SVU).
	Stella Rimington			United Kingdom	Former Director General of MI5.
	Helen Willa Samuels			United States	Archivist of the Massachusetts Institute of Technology
	Celia Sánchez			Cuba	Archived many documents of Cuban Revolution.
	Jason Scott Sadofsky	September 13, 1970		United States	Creator and maintainer of textfiles.com, a web site which archives files from historic bulletin board systems; founder of Archive Team, a group to preserving copies of websites that close down (e.g. GeoCities); and filmmaker of BBS: The Documentary and GET LAMP.
	T. R. Schellenberg			United States	
	Soemartini	1930		Indonesia	Served as Chief of the National Archives of Indonesia for over two decades.
	Henry Spencer	1955		Canada	Preserved more than 2 million Usenet messages onto magnetic tapes. The contents were imported into Google's archives.
	Marion Stokes	November 25, 1929	December 14, 2012	United States	Recorded hundreds of thousands of hours of television news footage spanning 35 years. After her death, the collection was given to Internet Archive.
	Tonia Sutherland			United States	She is an assistant professor in the UCLA School of Education and Information Studies and an expert in Black archival studies.
	Shelley Sweeney	1959		Canada	She is the Head of the University of Manitoba Archives & Special Collections.
	Gerhard Tausche	1957		Germany	
	Hugh Taylor	1920	2005	Canada	Author and theorist. Founding Provincial Archivist of the Provincial Archives of Alberta.
	Édith Thomas			France	Worked at the Archives nationales in Paris
Tiny Tim in 1969	Tiny Tim	1932		United States	Musical archivist
	Dragan Espenschied	1975		Germany / United States	Directs the Rhizome digital preservation program, which oversees 2000+ born-digital artworks, as well as the creation of a suite of archiving tools.
	Paul Marie Viollet	October 24, 1840	November 22, 1914	France	Worked at the Archives nationales in Paris.
	Rinskje Visscher	December 10, 1868	March 26, 1950	Netherlands	First female municipal archivist in the Netherlands
	Natalis de Wailly	May 10, 1805	December 4, 1886	France	Head of the Administrative Section of the Archives de l'Empire.
	Jean-Pierre Wallot	May 22, 1935	August 30, 2010	Canada	Former National Archivist of Canada
	Edward Weldon	1936		United States	First State Archivist of New York State Archives (1974–1980), Deputy Archivist of the United States National Archives and Records Administration (1980–1982), State Archivist of Georgia Archives (1982–2000)
	Anita Wilson	1943	2006	United Kingdom	Established Tuvalu's archive in 1978. Archivist for Government of Hong Kong (1986–1997). Archivist at British royal family archive (2001–2006)
	Ian E. Wilson	1943		Canada	Former Librarian and Archivist of Canada
	Gladys Hansen	1925	March 5, 2017	United States	Expert on the 1906 San Francisco earthquake
	Meredith Evans			United States	Director of the Jimmy Carter Presidential Library and Museum
	Herman Vandenburg Ames	August 7, 1865	February 7, 1935	United States	helped guide the widespread establishment of government archives throughout the United States
Scanned newspaper clipping of portrait of Alexander Fraser	Alexander Fraser (archivist)	1860	1936	Canada	First Provincial Archivist of Ontario (1903–1935)
	Laureano Macedo	1978		Portugal	portuguese scholar.
	Rebecka Sheffield	1976		Canada	LGBTQ2+ community-based archives
	Guddu			Pakistan	Archivist of film posters and photographs

== See also ==
- List of female archivists
- Archival science
- List of archives
- List of national archives
- List of digital preservation initiatives
