= Records continuum model =

Abstract conceptual model used in archival science

The records continuum model

The records continuum model (RCM) is an abstract conceptual model that helps to understand and explore recordkeeping activities. It was created in the 1990s by Monash University academic Frank Upward with input from colleagues Sue McKemmish and Livia Iacovino as a response to evolving discussions about the challenges of managing digital records and archives in the discipline of archival science.

The RCM was first published in Upward's 1996 paper "Structuring the Records Continuum – Part One: Postcustodial principles and properties". Upward describes the RCM within the broad context of a continuum where activities and interactions transform documents into records, evidence and memory that are used for multiple purposes over time. Upward places the RCM within a post-custodial, postmodern and structuration conceptual framework. Australian academics and practitioners continue to explore, develop and extend the RCM and records continuum theory, along with international collaborators, via the Records Continuum Research Group (RCRG) at Monash University.

== Description ==
The RCM is an abstract conceptual model that helps to understand and explore recordkeeping activities (as interaction) in relation to multiple contexts over space and time (spacetime). Recordkeeping activities span a time period encompassing multiple action structures within recordkeeping, including contemporary recordkeeping, regulatory recordkeeping, and historical recordkeeping. Through policies, systems, organizations, processes, laws, and social mandates, archivists and recordkeepers are able to appraise records in a manner which accounts for the record from the time period prior to its creation to its use in current recordkeeping practices. In a continuum, recordkeeping processes, such as adding metadata, fix documents, to enable them to be managed as contextual evidence. Records deemed as having continuing value are retained and managed as historical recordkeeping via the context of provenance, however, records which have no archival value are destroyed once they lose their administrative value. The implication of an RCM approach to archiving is that systems and processes establish records as both current and archival at the point of creation.

The RCM can be visualized as a series of 4 concentric rings, or dimensions; Document Creation, Records Capture, The Organization of Corporate and Personal Memory and The Pluralization of Collective Memory intersecting with a set of crossed axes; transactionality, evidentiality, recordkeeping and identity. Each axis is labelled with a description of the activity or interaction that occurs at that intersection. Create, Capture, Organize and Pluralize, as the dimensions are referred to in short, represent recordkeeping activities that occur within spacetime. Activities that occur in these dimensions across the axes are explained in the table below:

Dimension	Transactionality	Evidentiality	Recordkeeping	Identity
Create	Transaction. A document is created.	Trace. A document is created as part of an immediate and minimal information process. All that is captured is the document structure and content, as well as potentially their order within the immediate context of creation.	[Archival] Document. A document is created and captured into an information system of some kind.	Actor(s). Someone (a person) decides to carry out an act that generates recorded information of some kind.
Capture	Activity. Records are managed as part of an activity performed by a group within an organization.	Evidence. Records are captured as evidence of the activity that contributed to their creation.	Record(s). Records are captured into a recordkeeping system.	Unit(s). Records are captured and accessed by a group of people.
Organize	Function. Records are managed as part of a function performed by an organization.	Corporate/Individual Memory. Records are organized and managed as evidence of their function(s) and play a role as organizational memory.	Archive. Records are organized in an archive as indication that they have continuing value for the organization/group/community.	Organization. Records are organized, accessed and managed according to organizational contexts.
Pluralize	Purpose. Records are managed within their ambient function(s) or societal purpose(s).	Collective Memory. Records are organized, managed and retained as evidence of their collective socio-legal memory.	Archives. Records are pluralized by demonstrating their ongoing value as collective memory by ensuring they are part of archival systems that carry records beyond the life of an organization.	Institution. Records are pluralized through institutions that manage records for societal benefit.

The value of the RCM is that it can help to visualize where on the continuum recordkeeping activities can be placed. The continuum can then be used to explore conceptual and practical assumptions that underpin recordkeeping practices, in particular the dualisms inherent in the usage and practice of the terms "records" and "archives". This definition lends itself to a linear reading of the RCM – beginning with Create and working outwards towards Pluralization of recorded information. Another linear reading is to consider design first – the role that systems of Pluralization and Organization play in designing, planning and implementing recordkeeping and then considering the implications for Create and Capture. However, these are just two of many ways to interpret the model as the dimensions and axes represent multiple realities that occur within spacetime, any of which can occur simultaneously, concurrently and sequentially in electronic or digital environments, and/or physical spaces.

By representing multiple realities, the RCM articulates the numerous and diverse points of view that contribute to records and archives including individual, group, community, organizational, institutional and societal perspectives. These contexts reveal the need to consider various stakeholders and co-contributors in relation to use, access and appraisal of records and archives. Over the lifespan of a record, multiple decisions are made by various stakeholders of the records that include, but are not limited to records managers and archivists. Other stakeholders can be identified at various dimensions of interaction, including those involved in providing information (not only the person or organization who produced or captured it), as well as their family and community. Records are therefore not simply physical or digital representations of physical objects held and managed in an archive or repository, but are evidence of multiple perspectives, narratives and contexts that contributed to their formation.

The records continuum model is often described as being in contrast or at odds with the lifecycle records model. While the RCM is inclusive of multiple ways of conceptualizing and performing recordkeeping, including a lifecycle approach, there are some significant differences. While the lifecycle approach shows clearly designated phases in the management of records, a continuum approach conceptualizes these individual elements as continuous and not as discernable parts. Second, the lifecycle approach clearly identifies conceptual and procedural boundaries between current and inactive records. Current records are identified as "records" while inactive or historical records are identified as "archives." However, a continuum approach sees records management as an integrated process which crosses spacetime. This more temporal method of recordkeeping processes enables their use for multiple contexts and representations.

What this means is that records are "in a state of always becoming...", able to contribute new contexts dependent on the differing perceptions and historical backgrounds of various stakeholders who are analyzing their contents. Archival records are therefore not just historical or fixed, but are able to be re-interpreted, re-created, and re-contextualized according to their place and use in spacetime. In this way, archival institutions are nodes in the network of recorded information and its contexts, rather than the end point in a lifecycle stage for records that are managed as "relics".

== Theory and influences ==
The RCM is a representation of what is commonly referred to as records continuum theory, as well as Australian continuum thinking and/or approaches. These ideas were evolved as part of an Australian approach to archival management espoused by Ian Maclean, Chief Archivist of the Commonwealth Archives Office in Australia in the 1950s and 1960s. Maclean, whose ideas and practices were the subject of the first RCRG publication in 1994, referred in a 1959 American Archivist article to a "continuum of (public) records administration" from administrative efficiency through recordkeeping to the safe keeping of a "cultural end-product". Maclean's vision challenged the divide between current recordkeeping and archival practice. Peter Scott, a contemporary at the Commonwealth Archives Office, is also recognized as a core influence on Australian records continuum theory with his development of the Australian Series System, a registry system that helped identify and document the complex and multiple "social, functional, provenancial, and documentary relationships" involved in managing records and recordkeeping processes over spacetime.

Further influences on the RCRG group include archival professionals and researchers like David Bearman and his work on transactionality and systems thinking, and Terry Cook's ideas about postcustodialism and macroappraisal. Broader influences to the continuum theory come from philosophers and social theorists Jacques Lacan, Michel Foucault, Jacques Derrida, and Jean-François Lyotard, as well as sociologist Anthony Giddens, with structuration theory being a core component of understanding social interaction over spacetime. Canadian archivist Jay Atherton's critique of the division between records managers and archivists in the 1980s and use of the term "records continuum" re-commenced the conversation MacLean began during his career and helped to bring his ideas and this term to Australian records continuum thinking. Atherton's use of the term records continuum has several significant differences in conception, application and heritage when compared to Australian records continuum thinking.

Post-custodiality as an archival concept plays a major role in how the RCM was conceived. This term was born from an identified and urgent need to address the complexities of computer technologies on records creation and management over time and space. Post-custodiality is discussed by Frank Upward and Sue McKemmish in 1994 as part of an exploration of changes in archival discourse commencing in the 1980s by Gerald Ham and expanded on by Terry Cook as part of a "post-custodial paradigm shift". Post-custodiality in relation to the RCM is explored by Upward and McKemmish as an entry point into a wider conversation about records and recordkeeping being part of a process in which archival institutions have a part to play beyond that of the archival authority handling, appraisal, describing and arranging physical objects in their custody.

Drawing from the above theoretical foundations, the RCM as a framework acknowledges the central role that recordkeeping activities have on the creation, capture, organization and ongoing management of records over time and throughout spaces such as organizations and institutional archives. Recordkeeping is a practice and a concept clearly defined in the archival and records literature by continuum writers as "a broad and inclusive concept of integrated recordkeeping and archiving processes for current, regulatory, and historical recordkeeping purposes". Recordkeeping refers to the activities performed on records that add new contexts such as capturing a record into a system, adding metadata, or selecting it for an archive. In the RCM records are therefore not defined according to their status as objects. Rather, records are understood as being part of a continuum of activity related to known (as well as potentially unknown) contexts. A record (as well as records, collections and archives) are therefore part of larger social, cultural, political, legal and archival processes. It is these contexts that are vital to understanding the role, value and evidential qualities of records in and across spacetime (past, present and potential future).

== Other information continuum models ==
The RCM is the most well-known of all the continuum models created, but does not exist in isolation. Several other complementary models have been created by RCM creator Frank Upward, and there are others created by continuum researchers that offer enhanced or alternative ways of understanding the continuum.

The series of continuum models created by Frank Upward include:

- Information Systems (Data) Continuum Model (data modeling and data flow)
- Cultural Heritage Continuum Model (the stories the documents tell and the significance of those stories to others)
- Publication (Access) Continuum Model (the reach of accessibility and the way the document is issued)

Models created in collaboration:

- Information Continuum Model (Barbara Reed, Don Schauder, Frank Upward) (the technologies driving the system and classification methods)

Other models:

- Juridical contexts of the records continuum model (Livia Iacovino)
- Mediated recordkeeping: culture-as-evidence (Leisa Gibbons)
