= TNLA =

TNLA may stand for:

- Ta'ang National Liberation Army, in Myanmar (Burma)
- Tamil Nadu Liberation Army
- Tamil National Liberation Alliance
- Tamil Nadu Legislative Assembly
- Tuvalu National Library and Archives
