= Robert-Henri Bautier =

French historian, archivist, and medievalist (1922–2010)

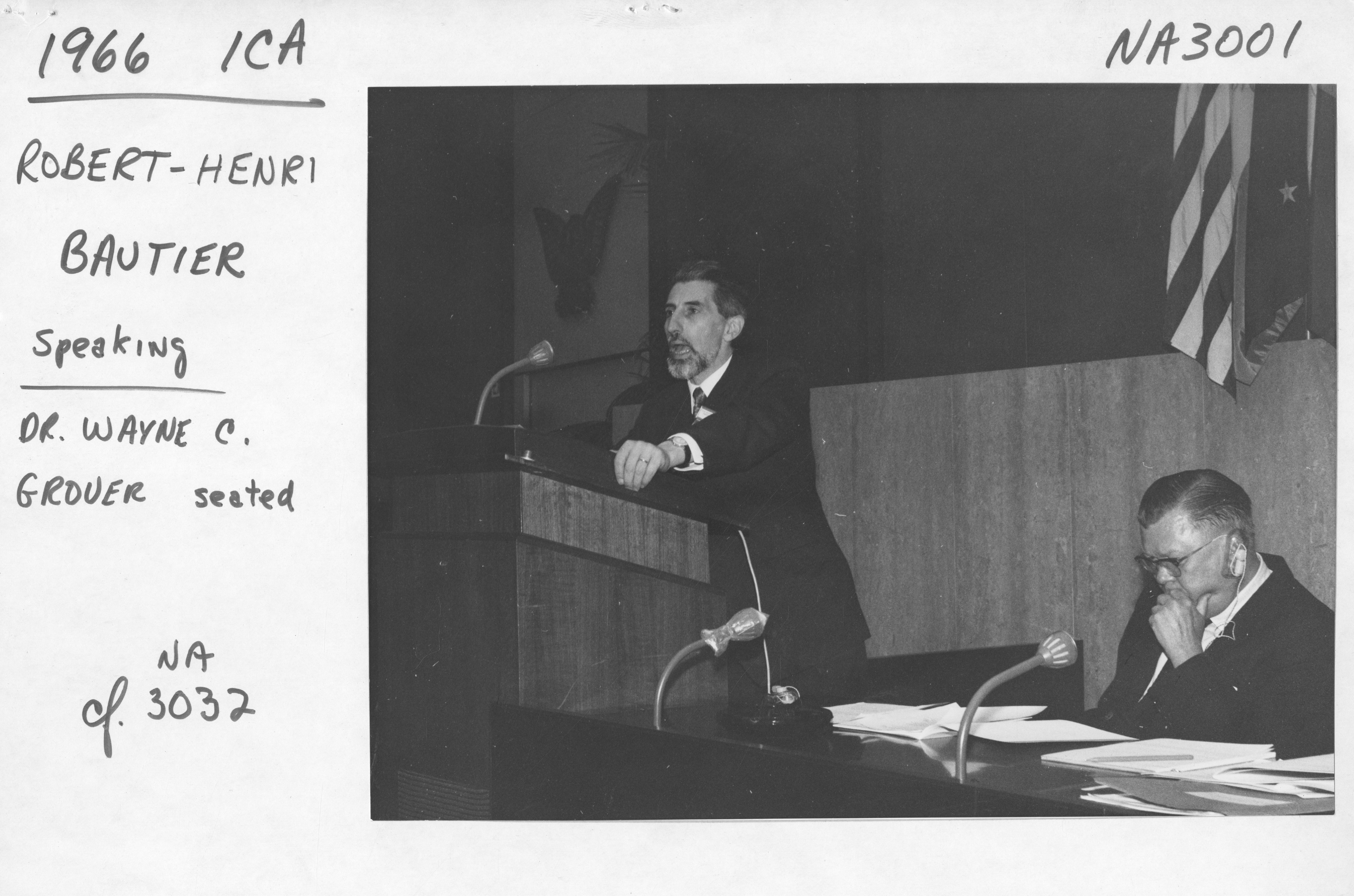
Robert-Henri Bautier with Wayne C. Grover at 1966 International Council on Archives Extraordinary Congress

Robert-Henri Bautier (19 April 1922 – 19 October 2010) was a French historian, archivist, and medievalist. He was elected a member of the Royal Academy of Science, Letters and Fine Arts of Belgium in 1986.

== Biography ==
Robert-Henri Émile Bautier entered the École Nationale des Chartes in 1939, where he wrote a thesis entitled L'exercice de la justice publique dans l'Empire carolingien (The exercise of public justice in the Carolingian Empire), earning him a diploma as archivist paleographer in 1943. Appointed archivist at the Archives Nationales (France), he was seconded to the École française de Rome (1943-1944), but was unable to return to the city.

In 1944, he became chief archivist of the Creuse region, where he investigated the disappearance of Marc Bloch, and collected Occupation archives in compliance with official instructions. From 1945 to 1948, he was in charge of research in Italy for the French National Centre for Scientific Research(CNRS). He took part in administrative missions following the modification of the Italian border (member of the French delegation for the execution of the archive clauses of the 1947 Franco-Italian peace treaty (1948), and delegate for the handover of the Savoy and Nice archives to France (1949-1952). He is also in charge of negotiating Franco-German disputes (“archives extraradées Alsace et de Lorraine”) and Franco-German archive exchanges (1951-1952).

He then returned to his post as archive curator, first at the Archives Nationales (France) and then at the Direction des Archives de France, and as head of the Service des Études et du stage international des Archives (1948-1958).

In 1958, he was appointed attaché de recherche at the French National Centre for Scientific Research, and in 1961 became Professor of Diplomatics and Archival science (Chair of Diplomatics Studies in 1961, École Nationale des Chartes Studies and Historiography in 1970), a position he held until 1990, when he was appointed Professor en surnombre (1990-1992). In the 1970s, he initiated and coordinated an Atlas historique du Limousin, which was never published.

He is the author of articles on Diplomatics, Sigillography, medieval archives and the production of deeds in the Middle Ages.

He was elected member of the Académie des Inscriptions et Belles-Lettres on December 13, 1974. His wife Anne-Marie died on January 2, 2008 at the age of 87.

He was also responsible for overseeing the Musée du Château de Langeais (1986-1991), and, as a member of the Institut de Francet, curator of the Royal Chaalis Abbey (1992-2000).

He was a member of many learned societies, including the Société de l'histoire de France, the Société nationale des antiquaires de France, the Société française d'héraldique et de sigillographie, or Monumenta Germaniæ Historica (he was president of the first three), the Société d'histoire et d'archéologie de l'arrondissement de Provins, of which he was honorary president from 1999 to his death, and was a corresponding member of the Académie de Stanislas. He is a member of the Royal Academy of Science, Letters and Fine Arts of Belgium and several other foreign academies. He has also been a member of the Comité des travaux historiques et scientifiques, and of numerous commissions on archives, diplomacy and sigillography.

== Works ==
- Helgaud de Fleury. Vie de Robert le Pieux, 1965 (édition et traduction annotée, with coll. by G. Labory)
- Recueil des actes d’Eudes, roi de France (888–898), 1967
- Les sources de l’histoire économique et sociale du Moyen Âge. 1re série (1968–1974), Provence, Comtat Venaissin, Dauphiné, États de la maison de Savoie. 2e série (1984), États de la maison de Bourgogne (in collaboration with J. Sornay), 1968–1984
- André de Fleury, 1969 (édition et traduction annotée, in collaboration with G. Labory)
- The economic development of Medieval Europe, 1971
- Recueil des actes de Louis II le Bègue, Louis III et Carloman, rois des Francs (877–884), 1979 (in collaboration with F. Grat, J. de Font-Réaulx and G. Tessier)
- La France de Philippe Auguste : le temps des mutations, 1982 (collective)
- Les origines de l’abbaye de Bouxières-aux-Dames (diocèse de Toul). Reconstitution du chartrier et édition critique des chartes antérieures à 1200, 1987
- Chartes, sceaux et chancelleries : études de diplomatique et de sigillographie médiévales, 2 vol., 1990
- Vocabulaire international de la sigillographie, 1990
- Recherches sur l’histoire de la France médiévale : des Mérovingiens aux premiers Capétiens, 1991
- Études sur la France capétienne : de Louis VI aux fils de Philippe le Bel, 1991
- Sur l’histoire économique de la France médiévale : routes, foires, draperies, 1992
- Château de Langeais : histoire et guide-itinéraire du Musée, 1992
- Le Musée Jacquemart-André à Chaalis : historique de l’abbaye royale de Chaalis et guide-itinéraire des collections du Musée, 1992
- Commerce méditerranéen et banquiers italiens au Moyen Âge, 1992
- Vocabulaire international de la diplomatique, 1994

== See also ==
- List of archivists
