= Paul Conway (archivist) =

American archivist

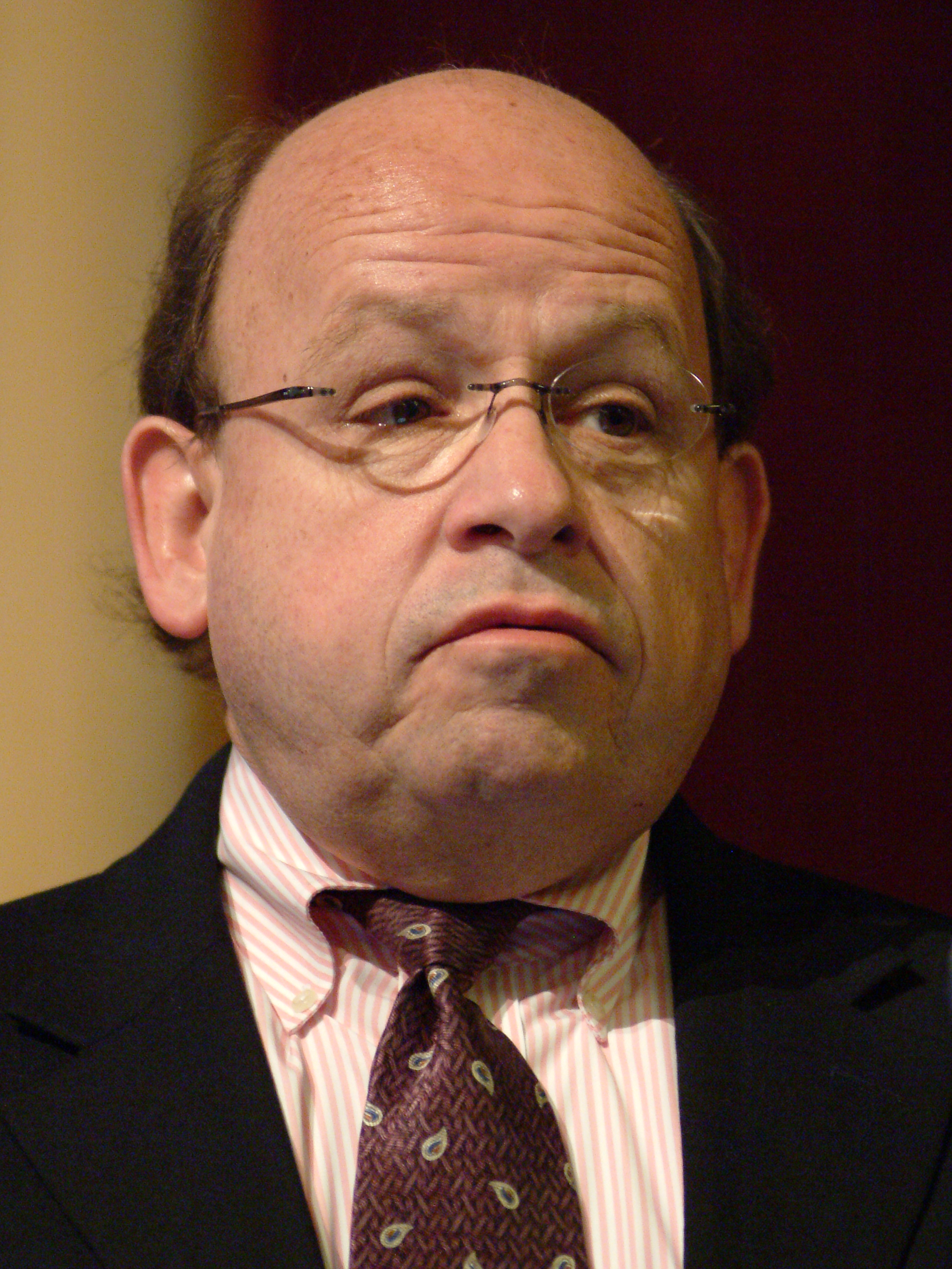
- Conway in 2009
- Born: September 7, 1953 (age 73)
- Occupations: Archivist, preservation administrator, and educator
- Spouse: Martha O’Hara Conway

Academic background
- Education: Indiana University Bloomington, University of Michigan
- Thesis: Archival Preservation in the United States and the Role of Information Sources (1991)

Paul Conway (born 7 September 1953 in Chicago) is an associate professor emeritus at the University of Michigan School of Information and has worked with Yale University and Duke University Universities after starting his career at the Gerald R. Ford Presidential Library. His research and educational work focuses primarily on digital preservation and electronic media. He has published extensively throughout his career on library preservation, conservation issues, and education of library and archives personnel.

== Education ==
In 1975, Conway received his BA (Honors) in History from Indiana University Bloomington. He has an MA in history: administration of archives (1980) and a Ph.D. in information and library studies (1991), both from the University of Michigan. His doctoral dissertation is titled "Archival Preservation in the United States and the Role of Information Sources". His research interests mainly focus on the challenges of digital information preservation and management.

== Career and significance to preservation ==
Conway joined the staff of the Gerald R. Ford Presidential Library as an archivist in October 1977 and worked there for ten years. Between 1987 and 1989, Conway worked for the Society of American Archivists as a Preservation Program Officer. From January 1990 to May 1992, he worked for the National Archives and Records Administration in various research positions. It was here that he conducted research on the Use of Archives and a review of how government agencies implement digital imaging and optical disc technology. Conway also served successfully as Preservation Program Officer for the Society of American Archivists in Chicago in 1988 and 1989. During this period, he carried out a nationwide survey of archival preservation programs. Conway became a Fellow of the Society of American Archivists in 1997.

From 1992 to 2001, Conway headed the Preservation Department at Yale University Library. While at Yale, Conway held several administrative positions and managed digital research and development projects, including Project Open Book, a planning project exploring the complexities of guaranteeing long-term access to e-journal content produced by commercial publishers, and an exploration of the potential value of e-book content to library course reserve programs. While at Yale, Conway developed a framework for understanding preservation in the digital context by creating a bridge from the five core principles of traditional preservation practice.

Prior to going to University of Michigan, Conway led the library information technology programs and services at Duke University from August 2001 to August 2006, as director for information technology services and for digital asset initiatives. At Duke, Conway focused on developing a digital service for provision and preservation of digital resources to serve the university community. Starting in September 2006, he was an associate professor at the University of Michigan School of Information. In January, 2021, he retired from his position after almost fifteen years with the university.

His impact on the archival profession is also realized in his career as a successful educator. His extensive experience in administration of archives and the practice of preservation give him a practical approach to teaching as evidenced in his courses. The courses he has developed and taught cover preservation management, archival approaches to digital content management, and digital preservation. He has also conducted several specialized workshops and seminars on information technology issues. From August 2001 to 2006, he was an Adjunct Associate Research and Teaching Professor at the University of North Carolina at Chapel Hill. He also was an Adjunct Associate Professor of Public Policy Studies and Faculty Director for Curriculum Development at Duke from July 2005 to August 2006, where he developed a curriculum for first years, "Game2know,". From 1996 to 2006, Conway worked with the Society of American Archivists as an instructor. He was involved in designing and teaching full-day workshops on digital imaging technology, including definitions of terms, system requirements, preservation and access issues, project planning, and funding.

Conway has published widely on digital preservation issues, archival users and use of archival information. His contribution to the preservation literature is in form of books, articles in peer-reviewed journals, book chapters, book reviews and conference papers. He was a member of the American Archivist editorial board from 2006 to 2012.

== Fellowships and awards ==
- 1985 Mellon Fellowship, Bentley Historical Library, University of Michigan
- 1986 H. W. Wilson Scholarship, University of Michigan
- 1996 Fellow, Calhoun College, Yale University
- 1997 Fellow, Society of American Archivists
- 2004 Research Libraries Leadership Fellowship, Association of Research Libraries
- 2005 Paul Banks and Carolyn Harris Preservation Award

== Works ==
=== Books ===
- Partners in Research: Toward Enhanced Access to the Nation's Archive: A Report on the Users of the National Archives (1994)
- Flood In Florence, 1966: A Fifty-Year Retrospective (2018, co-edited with Martha O'Hara Conway)

=== Journal publications ===
- "Modeling the Digital Content Landscape in Universities." Library Hi Tech 26 (3): 342–358. (2008)
- "Building Meaning in Digitized Photographs." Journal of the Chicago Colloquium on Digital Humanities and Computer Science 1 (no. 1). (2009)
- "Preservation in the Age of Google: Digitization, Digital Preservation, and Dilemmas." The Library Quarterly 80 (1): 61–79. (2010)
- "Modes of Seeing: Digitized Photographic Archives and the Experienced User." American Archivist 73 (Fall): 425–462. (2010)
- "Archival Quality and Long-term Preservation: A Research Framework for Validating the Usefulness of Digital Surrogates." Archival Science 11 (3): 293–309. DOI: 10.1007/s10502-011-9155-0 (2011)
- "Preserving Imperfection: Assessing the Incidence of Digitization Error in HathiTrust," Preservation, Digital Technology & Culture 42, No. 1, pp. 17–30. (2013)
- "New Culture of Scholarship: An Analysis of North American Archival Research Articles," American Archivist Online Supplement to Volume 74, pp. 306:1-15. (2013)
- "At the Nexus of Analog and Digital: A Symposium of Preservation Educators," Preservation, Digital Technology & Culture 43, No. 1-2; 2–8. (2014)
- "Digital Transformations and the Archival Nature of Surrogates," Archival Science 15 (1): 51–69. DOI: 10.1007/s10502-014-9219-z (2015)

== See also ==
- List of archivists
- Digital preservation
- Preservation (library and archival science)
- Library and Information Science
