= Tuvalu National Library and Archives =

Coordinates: 8°31′S 179°03′E

Agency overview
- Jurisdiction: Tuvalu
- Headquarters: Funafuti
- Agency executive: Kana Teafiula, National Librarian and Archivist
- Parent agency: Ministry of Education and Culture
- Website: https://www.tuvaluarchives.tv/

The Tuvalu National Library and Archives (TNLA) is the national library of Tuvalu. It is located in Funafuti.

== Role and facilities ==
The TNLA holds "vital documentation on the cultural, social and political heritage of Tuvalu", including surviving records from the colonial administration, as well as Tuvalu government archives.

The library's archives have been described as "comparatively well housed" but "endangered [...] through frequent and heavy use and [...] through risk of being washed away in a cyclone-prone area. Environmental and handling damage is occurring to key customary records". This has resulted in the Tuvalu National Archives preservation pilot project (EAP005) and Tuvalu National Archives major project of 2005, projects of the British Library and the Pacific Manuscripts Bureau of the ANU Research School of Pacific and Asian Studies, Australian National University to microfilm and digitally copy the archives.

== National Librarian and Archivist ==
Tuvalu's first Librarian and Archivist was Anita Wilson. She was appointed to establish the archive in 1977, when the government received its share of the former Western Pacific Archives, together with copies of all the publications from the Tuvalu Church. At the same time she was tasked with establishing Tuvalu's first public library.

Kana Teafiula is the Acting Librarian and Archivist.

== See also ==
- List of national libraries
- List of national archives
