= Yvonne Bezard =

French archivist and historian (1893–1939)

- Born: Yvonne Henriette Julie Bezard; 8 December 1893; Angers (Maine-et-Loire), France
- Died: 30 March 1939 (aged 45); Versailles (Yvelines) France
- Education: Sorbonne, École des Chartes
- Occupations: Archivist, historian

Signature
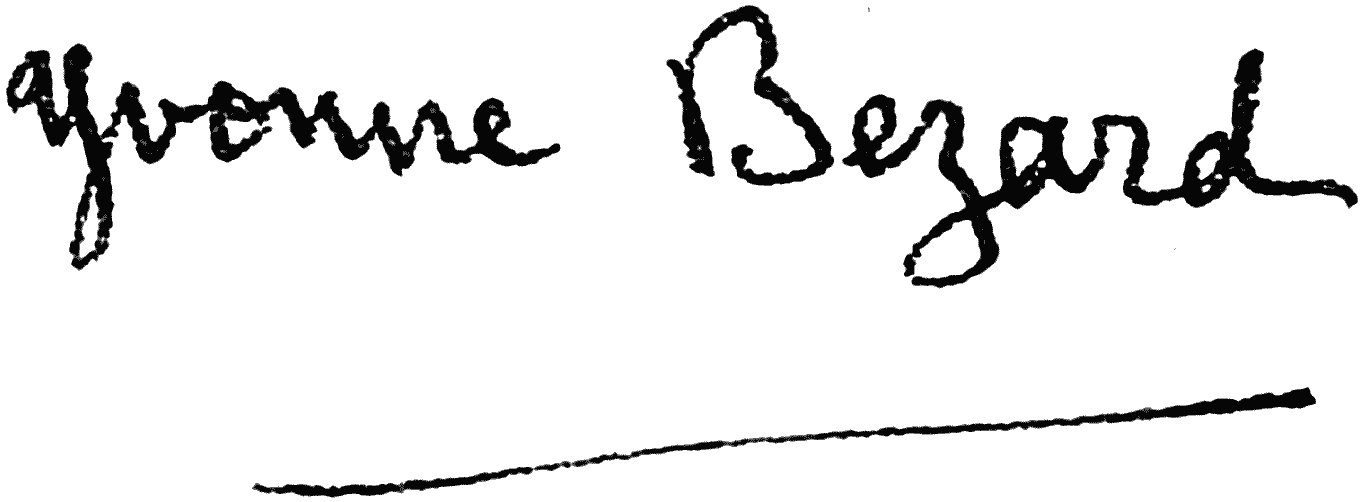

Yvonne Henriette Julie Bezard (8 December 1893 – 30 March 1939), was a French archivist and historian who worked at the National Archives of France. Her work was selected for prestigious awards, one from the Académie des inscriptions et belles-lettres and two from the Académie Française.

== Biography ==
Yvonne Bezard was born into an educated family in Angers (Maine-et-Loire) on 8 December 1893. After they moved to Versailles, her father became a long-time teacher at the Lycée Hoche. Bezard graduated in literature and earned a diploma in history and geography. After studying at the Sorbonne she presented research about the history of Versailles and her family ties to the city.

In 1923, Bezard entered the École des Chartes located in Paris and graduated third in her class in 1927, after she defended her thesis on Rural Life in the Josas Archdeaconry from the Hundred Years' War to the beginning of the Wars of Religion. Two years later, that thesis was reworked and finalized under a new title: La vie rurale dans le sud de la région parisienne de 1450 à 1560. At the same time, she published the Lettres du président de Brosses à Loppin de Gémeaux. With these two theses, she earned the title Doctor of Letters.

Soon after her thesis defense in 1930, she received significant awards. For Lettres du président de Brosses, Bezard received a Prix d'Académie from the Académie Française; for Vie Rurale, the Académie des inscriptions et belles-lettres gave her one of its most sought-after awards, the first medal of the Antiquités Nationales.

=== Research ===
Bezard's publications were numerous and included many articles in the Review of Literary History of France and the Review of the History of Versailles and Seine-et-Oise. One of her research projects concerned the study of Burgundian family life in the 16th century; a detailed study of administrative and colonial history, which in 1933, earned her another award from the Académie Française, the Prix Jules Favre.

During a stay in Switzerland, she produced a volume about Madame de Staël (1938). In Switzerland she also researched the "erudite and witty" President of the Dijon Parliament, Charles de Brosses. Her resulting book was titled Le Président de Brosses et ses amis de Genève, a collection of 104 letters exchanged between 1744 and 1766 with magistrates and scholars from Geneva, Switzerland. She was still correcting the proofs of this book when she was struck down by an illness that would claim her life within days. She tried to continue her corrections on her deathbed, but the manuscript was left to her family to finish.

=== Personal life ===
She was known to send personal notes to those close to her, one of which included this excerpt: “The best thing about life ... you can't be happy alone, even in success."

She died at 45 in Versailles on 30 March 1939 after a sudden illness.

=== Memberships ===
- Association of French Archivists: member
- Religious History Society of France: member1932–1939
- Society of the School of Charters: member
- Society of the History of Paris and the Île-de-France: member, 1930–1939

== Selected publications ==
- Assistance at Versailles under the Ancien Régime and during the Revolution, Rennes, impr. Oberthür. Versailles, libr. M. Dubois, 17. rue Hoche, 1924 (Library of the History of Versailles and Seine-et-Oise, published by the Society of Moral Sciences, Letters and Arts of Seine-et-Oise. II).
- Burials at Saint-Germain-en-Laye in the 13th century, (S. l., 1927).
- Letters from President de Brosses to Ch.-C. Loppin de Gemeaux, Paris: Libr. de Paris, Firmin-Didot et Cie, 1929.
- Rural life in the south of the Paris region from 1450 to 1560, Mesnil (Eure), impr. Firmin-Didot; Paris, libr. Firmin-Didot et Cie, 1929.
- A Burgundian family in the 18th century, Clichy (Seine), impr. Paul Dupont; Paris, Albin Michel, publisher, 1930.
- Charles de Brosses. Familiar letters on Italy, published from the manuscripts with an introduction and notes, Paris: Firmin-Didot et Cie, 1931, 2 vols.
- Maritime and colonial officials under Louis XIV: the Bégons, Paris: Albin Michel, 1932.
- President de Brosses and his friends from Geneva: based on unpublished correspondence exchanged between Charles de Brosses, Bénigne Legouz de Gerland, Charles Bonnet, Pierre Pictet, Jean Jallabert, Dijon: Annales de Bourgogne, 1937.
- The inventory after the death of the haberdasher Cramoisy, Paris: [sn], 1938 (Extr. from: “Bulletin of the Society of the History of Paris and the Île de France”, vol. LXIV).
- Madame de Staël according to her portraits, Châteauroux: Impr. Langlois; Paris; Neuchâtel: V. Attinger, 1938 (Publications of the Society of Staël Studies).
