= Marie-Anne Chabin =

- Born: Marie-Anne; 17 October 1959 (age 66); Issoudun
- Citizenship: France
- Education: University of Paris; École des chartes
- Occupation: archivist
- Employer: Paris 8 University
- Website: http://www.arcateg.fr/

Marie-Anne Chabin (born 17 October 1959 in Issoudun, Indre) is a French archivist and an internationally recognized records management and information lifecycle management expert.

== Biography ==
Graduate of the École Nationale des Chartes, Chabin first gained experience as an archivist in the public sector. In 2000, she created an advisory firm for document and records management, called Archive 17. She is involved in many projects linked to ISO 15489 and MoReq standards and has published several books and articles about diplomatics and preservation of electronic records.

From 2017 to 2022, she was associate professor at the University of Paris VIII.

== Select bibliography ==
- Je pense, donc j'archive, Paris, L'Harmattan, 1999.
- Le management de l'archive, Paris, Hermès, 2000.
- Dématérialisation et archivage électronique, Paris, Dunod, 2006 (with Jean-Marc Rietsch and Eric Caprioli).
- Archiver, et après ?, Paris, Djakarta, 2007.

== See also ==
- List of archivists
