= Barbara L. Craig =

Canadian archivist, historian and educator

- Born: 1943 (age 82–83); Toronto
- Other name: Barbara Lazenby Craig
- Citizenship: Canadian
- Occupations: archivist, professor

Academic background
- Education: University of London
- Thesis: Hospital Records in London, England and the Province of Ontario, Canada, 1880 to 1950

Academic work
- Discipline: Archival science, History of Medicine, Records Management
- Institutions: University of Toronto Faculty of Information
- Main interests: medical records, archival theory, Archival appraisal
- Notable works: Archival Appraisal: Theory and Practice (München: K.G. Saur, 2004)

Barbara L. Craig is an archivist, archival educator and scholar. She has contributed to the scholarly literature of archival theory and professional practice in the areas of appraisal, the ethnographic study of practicing archivists and users of archives, and the history of archives in her study of the impact of technology on the record-keeping practices of the British Civil Service before 1960. She has an MA in history from McMaster University, a certificate in Principles and Administration of Archives from Library and Archives Canada, and a Certificate in Records Management from the Government of Ontario. In 1989 she completed a PhD in Archival Studies from the University of London. Her dissertation was titled "Hospital Records in London, England and the Province of Ontario, Canada, 1880 to 1950."

Craig was hired by the Archives of Ontario in 1970 where she was responsible for the records of the Ministry of Health, which prompted her scholarly interest in hospital records (she was also responsible for the records management of public general hospitals in the province).

Craig became University Archivist of York University in January 1989, serving in this capacity until 1994. In this role she published a summary of the archives holdings.

She joined the Faculty of Information Studies at the University of Toronto in 1994, where she taught courses in arrangement and description and archival appraisal, achieving the rank of full professor in 2008.

== Contributions to the archival profession ==
Craig was a founding member of the Association of Canadian Archivists, serving as president from 1983 to 1984. She also served in various capacities on the Canadian Council of Archives and the International Council on Archives, and was chair of the Ontario Council of Archives (later the Archives Association of Ontario) from 1989 to 1993. Craig was on the editorial board of the journal Archivaria from 2000 to 2006, serving as General Editor from 2002 to 2004. Craig has played a leading role in advancing research in the history of archives, most notably reflected in her co-organization of the first International Conference on the History of Records and Archives (I-CHORA) in 2003, along with Philip Eppard and Heather MacNeil.

== Awards and recognition ==
- 1991: W. Kaye Lamb Prize, for outstanding contributions to the development of archival theory, Association of Canadian Archivists
- 2008: Honorary Membership Award, Association of Canadian Archivists
- 2009: made a Founding Fellow of the Association of Canadian Archivists.
- 2010: awarded the James J. Talman Award by the Archives Association of Ontario.

== Selected publications ==
Books

- Craig, Barbara Lazenby (2004). Archival appraisal : theory and practice. München: K.G. Saur. ISBN 9783598440007. OCLC 646769813.
- Craig, Barbara Lazenby (2000). Medical archives: what they are and how to keep them : an introduction and some basic advice for individuals and institutions. Toronto: Associated Medical Services, Inc. OCLC 61741653.
- Lazenby., Craig, Barbara (1995). A guide to the fonds d'archives and collections in the holdings of the York University Archives :$b"th wide opn look uv the eyez". James, Peter D., York University (Toronto, Ont.). Archives. Toronto: ECW Press. ISBN 1550222295. OCLC 32088112.
- The Archival imagination : essays in honour of Hugh A. Taylor. Craig, Barbara Lazenby., Taylor, Hugh A. (Hugh Alexander), 1920-, Association of Canadian Archivists. Ottawa: Association of Canadian Archivists. 1992. ISBN 1895382068. OCLC 25869858.
- Ontario., Archives of (1985). Guide to the holdings of the Archives of Ontario. Craig, Barbara Lazenby., Ramsey, Richard W. Toronto, Canada: Ontario Ministry of Citizenship and Culture. ISBN 0772909253. OCLC 13671119.
- Lazenby., Craig, Barbara (1984). A separate and special place : an appreciative history of Toronto's Queen Elizabeth Hospital on the occasion of its 110th anniversary. MacLeod, Ronald K. (Ronald Keith), 1940-, Queen Elizabeth Hospital (Toronto, Ont.). Toronto: The Hospital. ISBN 096917800X. OCLC 16048571.
