= Simone Berbain =

French historian and archivist (1915–1949)

- Born: 31 January 1915; Paris, France
- Died: 21 November 1949 (aged 34); Paris, France
- Education: Diplomas d'Archiviste Paleographe
- Alma mater: École Nationale des Chartes
- Spouse: Jacques Bénet

Simone Berbain (1915–1949) was a French historian and archivist.

Born in Paris on 31 January 1915, Berbain spent her childhood in Indochina.

She attended École Nationale des Chartes where she trained as an archiviste paléographe. In 1939 Berbain completed her thesis on a French trading post in West Africa in the 18th century. Published in 1942 as "Le comptoir français de Juda (Ouidah) au XVIIIe siècle," the work was a well-received contribution to the history of the role France in the Atlantic slave trade.

Berbain's interest in questions of social history and the human elements that drove economic systems led to her involvement in various organizations during and immediately after the war. This included the Centre d'information interprofessionnelle, Cabinet du ministre de la Production industrielle, and the Comité interministériel pour les questions de coopération économique européenne.

Berbain married a classmate, Jacques Bénet, in 1944. Bénet was heavily involved in the French Resistance, and later was involved in advocating for POWs, deportees and refugees in France, during and after the Second World War. The couple had two children.

Simone died in Paris on 21 November 1949. Bénet's brother-in-law (it is unclear if this is Berbain's brother), then living in Algeria, took care of Simone's children, although her eldest daughter Christine, died in early 1950.

== Select bibliography ==
- Relations économiques de la France avec la Guinée de 1664 à 1797. (1939)
- Le comptoir français de Juda (Ouidah), au XVIIIe siècle. (1942)
- Études sur la traite des noirs au Golfe de Guinée. (1942)
- Les comités d'organisation: un bilan : octobre 1944. (1945)
