= Mollie Lukis =

Australian archivist and women's rights activist

Meroula ("Mollie") Frances Fellowes Lukis OAM OBE (13 August 1912 – 1 August 2009) was a Western Australian archivist and promoter of women's rights.

Lukis was born in Balingup, Western Australia in 1912. She attended St Mary's Church of England School in Perth and the University of Western Australia from where she graduated with Honours in 1932. She gained a Diploma of Teaching the following year and worked as a teacher in Perth, Victoria and England from 1932 to 1940. During the Second World War she worked at the Munitions Supply Laboratories in Victoria.

In 1945, State Librarian James Battye chose her to lead the state's archive branch, making her Australia's first female State Archivist. She was strongly influenced by the American archival theorist Theodore Schellenberg, whom she met during his 1954 Australian tour. In 1957, she was awarded a Carnegie Grant which allowed her to travel to the United States to study with him.

Lukis became the first head of the Battye Library in 1956 and retired in 1971.

She was appointed an Officer of the Order of the British Empire in 1976 and an Order of Australia Medal for her archival work. She also received an honorary doctorate from Murdoch University.

In 2006, The West Australian listed her as one of its 100 most influential people.
