= Helen Willa Samuels =

American archivist and scholar

Helen W. Samuels
- Born: 1943 (age 82–83)
- Occupation: Archivist
- Years active: 1965–2006
- Known for: Documentation Strategy, Institutional Functional Analysis
- Notable work: Varsity Letters: Documenting Modern Colleges and Universities

Helen Willa Samuels (born 1943) is an American archivist and scholar in archival studies. She is best known for her 1986 essay "Who Controls the Past", which introduced the concept of archival documentation strategy, and her 1992 book Varsity Letters: Documenting Modern Colleges and Universities.

== Biography ==
Helen Samuels was born in Queens, New York City, in 1943. She earned a Bachelor of Arts degree from Queens College in 1964 and a Masters in Library Science from Simmons College in 1965. She began her career in libraries in 1967 as the Music Specialist at the Massachusetts Public Library in Brookline, and worked as the Music Librarian at the Hilles Library at Radcliffe College until 1972.

In 1972 she was hired by the University of Cincinnati to run their fledgling archival program, a repository participating of the Ohio Historical Society's regional network. There she collaborated with faculty in the history department in order to create the university's first institutional archive, eventually holding the position as Head of Special Collections. In 1977, she became the first Institute Archivist at the Massachusetts Institute of Technology, where she built a collection of institutional records to document the history of the university. Based on her experience in this position and funded by an Andrew W. Mellon Foundation Grant, she wrote Varsity Letters: Documenting Modern Colleges and Universities, which was published in 1992, and which received the Society of American Archivists' Waldo Gifford Leland Award.

Her final professional position was at MIT in the role of Special Assistant to the Associate Provost. In that capacity she worked in research and writing for numerous campus policy and information issues. She also worked as an educator, consulted to other institutional repositories, and served in several professional organizations before her retirement in 2006.

According to Jelain Chubb and Ben Primer, during her career Samuels established herself as a respected voice in archival theory, particularly for the development of appraisal in an academic setting and her work processing science-related collections. She emphasized a “documentation strategy” for appraisal and intake of collections that consists of researching and documenting society and its institutions in an active, systematic, and comprehensive way.

== Major contributions ==
=== Documentation strategy ===
Samuels introduced the idea of documentation strategy in her American Archivist article "Who Controls the Past". While repositories had been implementing collection policies for some time, the idea of a documentation strategy was a new intellectual framework to guide archival practice. Samuels defined documentation strategy as "a plan formulated to assure the documentation of an ongoing issue, activity, or geographic area (e.g., the operation of the government of the state of New York, labor unions in the United States, the impact of technology on the environment)". Whereas collections policies governed the appraisal choices within an individual institutional archive, a documentation strategy would be based on subject, governing that process across several different repositories. Samuels noted the importance of collaboration between complementary institutions, as only a small fraction of archival records can be preserved by each archive.

=== Institutional functional analysis ===
Samuels' book Varsity Letters: Documenting Modern Colleges and Universities serves as the introduction to her theory of institutional functional analysis. This theory re-examined the popular archival method of processing a collection based on an institution's administrative structure and instead posited that institutional archivists should process records based on their function. She argued that functions are often spread across departments in universities and other institutions, and so archival records must be processed according to their use. She offered seven institutional functions: confer credentials, convey knowledge, foster socialization, conduct research, sustain the institution, provide public service, and promote culture. Although Samuels wrote this text specifically for colleges and universities, the archival practice of institutional functional analysis has been applied in many other institutional settings.

== Selected publications ==
- Processing Manual for the Institute Archives and Special Collections, MIT Libraries (Cambridge: Massachusetts Institute of Technology, 1981)
- "An Analysis of Processing Procedures: The Adaptable Approach." (with Karen T. Lynch), American Archivist 45 / Spring 1982
- "Who Controls the Past" American Archivist Volume 49, Number 2 / Spring 1986
- "The Roots of 128: A Hypothetical Documentation Strategy" (with Philip N. Alexander), American Archivist 50 / Fall 1987
- "The Archivist's First Responsibility: A Research Agenda to Improve the Identification and Retention of Records of Enduring Value" (with Richard J. Cox), American Archivist 51 / Winter/Spring 1988).
- North American Archival Identity," Second European Conference on Archival Proceedings, Ann Arbor, Michigan, 1989 (Paris: International Conference on the Archives, 1989)
- Varsity Letters: Documenting Modern Colleges and Universities. Chicago, Ill.: Society of American Archivists; Metuchen, N.J. : Scarecrow Press, 1992
- Improving Our Disposition: Documentation Strategies, Archivaria 33 (Winter 1991–92): 125-40
- Controlling the past: documenting society and institutions: essays in honor of Helen Willa Samuels Chicago: Society of American Archivists, 2011

== See also ==
- List of archivists
- Archival Appraisal
