= Absar Ahmed =

Pakistani archivist and researcher

- ابصار احمد
- Born: 1988 (age 37–38); Karachi, Pakistan
- Occupations: Archivist; researcher; songwriter; journalist
- Years active: 2005 – present
- Organization: Radio Pakistan
- Television: Geo TV; ARY News; Express TV; PTV
- Website: Pak Patriotic Liberary

Absar Ahmed is a Pakistani researcher and archivist of national songs as well as a journalist, broadcaster, and songwriter.

== Life and career ==
Absar was born in Karachi in 1988. He started his career in 2005 as an intern with Geo TV. Later, he has also been working at ARY News, Express TV, and PTV as a host, researcher, and scriptwriter. He has broadcast some shows and scripted documentaries on Radio Pakistan.

Reportedly, Absar is the first archivist of Pakistan who has preserved more than four and a half thousand rare or almost lost national and patriotic songs. Along with this collection, he has also written several research articles on national songs adapted to music, which have been published in Pakistan's reliable newspapers and magazines, including the Pakistan Army's journal Hilaal.

== Books ==
- Yeh Naghmay Pakistan Ke (2021) — a catalog and history of Pakistani national songs from 1945 to present.
- Har Taan Pakistan (2023) — a catalog and brief history of Pakistani patriotic songs from 1911 to present.

== Radio shows and documentaries ==
- Absar Ahmed Ke Sath
- Awaz-e-Pakistan
- Tehreek e Pakistan Key Sitare

== Songs ==
- Heeray Jaisay Saal
- Pakistan Ki Main Taqdeer
- Zarb-i-Azb song
- Raddul Fasad
- Hum Rangers ke jawan (an official song Pakistan Rangers)
- Main Pakistani Aurat hoon (Pakistani women's song
- Din Aaya Takbeer ka
- Azb ki hai Zarb
- Lab pe Khan Liaqaut Ali Zaroor Aya- Shaheed-e-Millat
- Arz - E-Pakistan Tere Jan Nisaron Ko Salam
- Main Hoon Pakistan
- Quaid-e-Azam Zindabad
