= Marie-Louise Marchand-Thébault =

French historian and archivist

- Born: Marie-Louise Thébault
- Died: 2007; Gan, Pyrénées-Atlantiques
- Education: Diplomas d'Archiviste paléographe
- Alma mater: École Nationale des Chartes
- Spouse: Claude Marchand

Marie-Louise Marchand-Thébault (died 2007) was a French historian and archivist, graduated in 1953 from the École Nationale des Chartes.

Working on the records of French colonies, at Centre des Archives d'Outre-Mer in Aix-en-Provence (CAOM), she was involved in locating and managing colonial records in French Guinea, Cameroon, and Madagascar.

Marchand-Thébault was involved after 1958 in arranging and describing the archival records related to Madagascar. She managed the archives section of the Office of the High Commissioner of France in Madagascar, while the archives section of the Upper Territory of Madagascar was headed by Jean Valette. She was involved in arranging and describing records series relating to the Malagasy Uprising of 1947 in Madagascar. She renamed a records series relating to the Insurrection of 1947 which also includes the pre-rebellion period. Originally established by the High Commission under "E" it was renamed "R" by Marchand-Thébault. She also added files that she gathered as part of her tour of local districts.

Marchand-Thébault published important works of scholarship about slavery in French Guinea during the ancien regime.

In 1976 she was appointed as conservator at the Municipal Archives of Toulouse.

== Select bibliography ==
- Marchand-Thébault, Marie-Louise (1953). Le coutumier bourguignon de la Bibliothèque nationale. Étude et édition (PhD). Ecole nationale des Chartres.
- Marchand-Thébault (1960). "L'esclavage en Guyane française sous l'ancien régime". Outre-Mers. Revue d'histoire. 47 (166): 5–75. doi:10.3406/outre.1960.1315. ISSN 0300-9513.
- Marchand-Thébault, M.-L (1960). L'esclavage en Guyane française sous l'ancien régime. S.l.
- Marchand-Thébault, Marie-Louise; René-Bazin, Paule (1973). Histoire de l'université de Paris. Paris: Chancellerie des Universités de Paris.
- Marchand, Marie-Louise; Duchein, Michel (1967). "Les archives de l'enseignement en France". La Gazette des Archives. 57 (1): 89–111. doi:10.3406/gazar.1967.1961. ISSN 0016-5522.
- Marchand, Marie-Louise (1965). "Les archives de l'Académie de Paris : expérience de gestion d'un dépôt de pré-archivage". Gazette des Archives. 50 (1): 121–129. doi:10.3406/gazar.1965.1835.
