= Terry Cook (archivist) =

Canadian archivist

Terry Cook (June 6, 1947 – May 12, 2014) was a noted Canadian archivist and scholar in archival studies.

== Biography ==
Dr. Terry Cook was born in Vancouver in 1947. He earned his Bachelor of Arts degree from the University of Alberta in 1969, his Master of Arts from Carleton University in 1970, and his Ph.D. in Canadian History from Queen's University in 1977. He worked for the National Archives of Canada, specializing in archival appraisal, for a number of years. He was also an associate professor for the Archival Studies Program in the Department of History at the University of Manitoba from 1998 to 2012.

During his time at the National Archives, he established himself as a respected voice in archival theory, particularly for the development of macroappraisal. He worked as an archival consultant at Clio Consulting from 1996 to 2014. In 1998, he became a professor in the Archival Studies Program at the University of Manitoba. Cook was named a Fellow of the Society of American Archivists and a Fellow of the Association of Canadian Archivists in 2009. His first job was at the Public Archives of Canada (now Library and Archives Canada), where he directed the appraisal and records for all media and developed an archival technique called macroappraisal. He authored over 80 articles, and edited many scholarly journals including (but not limited to) Archivaria, American Archivist, and Archival Science.

== Personal life and family ==
His wife is Sharon Anne Cook, a historian and professor of education at the University of Ottawa. Together they had two children, Graham and Tim. Cook died on May 12, 2014, of pancreatic cancer in Ottawa, Canada.

== Contributions to archival theory ==
Terry Cook was instrumental in the development of archival theory at the end of the 20th century and the beginning of the 21st. His scholarship covered archival appraisal, theories of the archive, total archives, postmodernism, community archives, the fonds and series systems of arrangement and description, the contrast between analogue and digital thinking and relations between archivists and historians. Cook revealed the agency of the archivist and pushed archivists to deeply consider their role in the shaping of the historical record. He also urged archivists to be transparent in their interventions

Cook's most noted contribution to archival appraisal theory was the development of macroappraisal, which he developed during his time at the Library and Archives Canada from 1975 to 1998 and received international acceptance. It is a method for deciding which small percentage of archived materials should be kept while destroying the rest.

In 2002, he earned the Society of American Archivists' Fellows' Ernst Posner award. In 2009, he was named a Fellow of the Association of Canadian Archivists, and of the Royal Society of Canada in 2010.

== Publications ==
- Cook, Terry. "Evidence, memory, identity, and community: four shifting archival paradigms." Archival Science 13, no. 2-3 (2013): 95–120.
- Controlling the past : documenting society and institutions : essays in honor of Helen Willa Samuels. Edited by Terry Cook. Chicago : Society of American Archivists, 2011.
- Cook, Terry. "The archive (s) is a foreign country: Historians, archivists, and the changing archival landscape." The American Archivist 74, no. 2 (2011): 600–632.
- Cook, Terry. "‘We are what we keep; we keep what we are’: archival appraisal past, present and future." Journal of the Society of Archivists 32, no. 2 (2011): 173-189.
- Cook, Terry. "The Archive(s) Is a Foreign Country: Historians, Archivists, and the Changing Archival Landscape" The American Archivist. Volume 74, no 2 (Fall-Winter 2011): 600–632.
- Cook, Terry. "CHR Forum: The Archive (s) Is a Foreign Country: Historians, Archivists, and the Changing Archival Landscape." Canadian Historical Review 90, no. 3 (2009): 497–534.
- Cook, Terry. "Bucks for your Bytes: Monetary Appraisal for Tax Credit of Private-Sector Electronic Database Records." Archivaria 62 (2007): 121–125.
- Cook, Terry. "An archival revolution: W. Kaye Lamb and the transformation of the archival profession." Archivaria 60 (2005): 185–234.
- Cook, Terry. "Macroappraisal in theory and practice: origins, characteristics, and implementation in Canada, 1950–2000." Archival Science 5, no. 2-4 (2005): 101–161.
- Cook, Terry. "Macro‐appraisal and functional analysis: documenting governance rather than government 1." Journal of the Society of Archivists 25, no. 1 (Spring 2004): 5–18.
- Cook, Terry. "Byte-ing off what you can chew: electronic records strategies for small archival institutions." Archifacts (2004): 1-20.
- Imagining Archives: Essays and Reflections of Hugh A. Taylor. Edited by Terry Cook and Gordon Dodds. Maryland: Rowman & Littlefield, 2003.
- Cook, Terry. “A Monumental Blunder: The Destruction of Records on Nazi War Criminals in Canada.” In Archives and the Public Good: Accountability and Records in Modern Society, edited by Richard J. Cox and David A. Wallace, 37–65. Westport, CT: Quorum Books, 2002.
- Cook, Terry, and Joan M. Schwartz, eds. "Archives, Records and Power." Two double-length special thematic issues of Archival Science: International Journal on Recorded Information, Volume 2, nos. 1/2 and 3/4, 2002.
- Cook, Terry, and Joan M. Schwartz. "Archives, Records, and Power: From (Postmodern) Theory to (Archival) Performance." Archival Science 2, no. 3-4 (2002):171–185.
- Cook, Terry. "Fashionable nonsense or professional rebirth: postmodernism and the practice of archives." Archivaria 51 (2001): 14–35.
- Cook, Terry. "Archival science and postmodernism: new formulations for old concepts." Archival science 1, no. 1 (2001): 3-24.
- Cook, Terry. "The Imperative of Challenging Absolutes" in Graduate Archival Education Programs: Issues for Educators and the Profession." The American Archivist 63, no 2 (Fall-Winter 2000): 380-391.
- Cook, Terry. "Beyond the Screen: The Records Continuum and Archival Cultural Heritage." In Beyond the Screen: Capturing Corporate and Social Memory, edited by Lucy Burrows, 8-21. Melbourne: Australian Society of Archivists, 2000.
- Cook, Terry. "What is past is prologue: a history of archival ideas since 1898, and the future paradigm shift." Archivaria 43 (1997): 17–63.
- Cook, Terry. "The impact of David Bearman on modern archival thinking: an essay of personal reflection and critique." Archives and Museum Informatics 11, no. 1 (1997): 15–37.
- Cook, Terry. "Building an Archives: Appraisal Theory for Architectural Records." The American Archivist 59, no 2 (Spring 1996): 136–143.
- Cook, Terry. "From the Record to its Context: The Theory and Practice of Archival Appraisal Since Jenkinson." South African Archives Journal 37 (1995): 32–52.
- Cook, Terry. "Leaving Archival Electronic Records in Institutions: Policy and Monitoring Arrangements at the National Archives of Canada." Archives and Museum Informatics 9, no. 2 (1995): 141–49.
- Cook, Terry. "Keeping our Electronic Memory: Approaches for Securing Computer-Generated Records." South African Archives Journal 37 (1995): 79–95.
- Cook, Terry. "It's Ten O'Clock: Do You Know Where Your Data Are?" Technology Review 98, no. 1 (January 1995): 48–53.
- Cook, Terry. "Electronic records, paper minds: the revolution in information management and archives in the post-custodial and post-modernist era." Archives and Manuscripts 22, no. 2 (1994): 300–328.
- Cook, Terry. "Another brick in the wall; Terry Eastwood’s masonry and archival walls, history and archival appraisal." Archivaria 37 (1994): 96–103.
- Cook, Terry. "Documentation strategy." Archivaria 34 (1992): 181–191.
- Cook, Terry. "The Concept of the Archival Fonds in the Post-Custodial Era: Theory, Problems and Solutions." Archivaria 35 (1992): 24–37.
- Cook, Terry. "Mind Over Matter: Towards a New Theory of Archival Appraisal." In The Archival Imagination: Essays in Honour of Hugh Taylor, edited by Barbara Craig, 38–70. Ottawa: Association of Canadian Archivists, 1992.
- Cook, Terry. "Easy to byte, harder to chew: the second generation of electronic records archives." Archivaria 33, (Winter 1991–1992): 202–216.
- Cook, Terry. The archival appraisal of records containing personal information : a RAMP study with guidelines. Paris : United Nations Educational, Scientific, and Cultural Organization, 1991.
- Cook, Terry. "Many are called but few are chosen: Appraisal Guidelines for Sampling and Selecting Case Files." Archivaria 32 (1991): 25–50.
- Cook, Terry. "Rites of passage: the archivist and the information age." Archivaria 31 (1990): 171–176.
- Cook, Terry. "Viewing the world upside down: reflections on the theoretical underpinnings of archival public programming." Archivaria 31 (1990): 123–134.
- Cook, Terry. “Paper Trails: A Study in Northern Records and Records Administration, 1898-1958." In 'For Purposes of Dominion': Essays in Honour of Morris Zaslow, edited by W. R. Morrison and Ken Coates. Canada: Captus University Publications, 1989.
- Cook, Terry. "Legacy in Limbo: An Introduction to the Records of the Department of the Interior." Archivaria 25 (Winter 1987–1988): 73–83.
- Cook, Terry. "Leaving Safe and Accustomed Ground: Ideas for Archivists." Archivaria 23 (1986): 123–128.
- Cook, Terry. "Shadows in the Canadian Archival Zeitgeist: The Jeremiad of Terry Eastwood Reconsidered." Archivaria 22 (Summer 1986): 156–162.
- Cook, Terry. "" Some of the Books are Worn Out": The Klondike Gold Rush and Records Conservation." Archivaria 22 (Summer 1986): 254-257.
- Cook, Terry. "Archives, Automation, and Access: The Vancouver Island Project Revisited." Archivaria 20 (Summer 1985): 231–237.
- Cook, Terry. "From information to knowledge: an intellectual paradigm for archives." Archivaria 19 (1984): 28–49.
- Cook, Terry. "From the Editor: Archival Networks and Congresses." Archivaria 17 (1983): 13–17.
- Cook, Terry. "From the Editor: Dead or Alive?" Archivaria 16 (Summer 1983): 3–4.
- Cook, Terry. "From the Editor: W. Kaye Lamb, Archives and Libraries." Archivaria 15 (Winter 1982–1983): 2–4.
- Cook, Terry. "Media Myopia." Archivaria 12 (1981): 146–157.
- Cook, Terry. " 'A Reconstruction of the World': George R. Parkin's British Empire Map of 1893," Cartographica 21, no. 4 (1981): 53–65.
- Cook, Terry. "Nailing Jelly to a Wall: Possibilities in Intellectual History." Archivaria 11 (1980): 205–218.
- Cook, Terry. "The Tyranny of the Medium: A Comment on" Total Archives"." Archivaria 9 (Winter 1979-1980): 141-149.
- Cook, Terry. "Freedom of Information: The Role of the Courts." Archivaria 6 (Summer 1978): 156–158.
- Cook, Terry. "VINCENT, Consolidated Liberator and Boeing Fortress." Archivaria 5 (1977): 222–223.
- Cook, Terry. "Clio: The Archivist's Muse?." Archivaria 5 (1977): 198–203.
- Cook, Terry. "Archives Yesterday: A Glimpse at the Enthusiasms and Tribulations of Sir Arthur Doughty" Archivaria 1 (1975): 113–115.

== See also ==
- List of archivists
