= Helen Forde =

English archaeologist

Helen Forde FSA

Academic work
- Discipline: Archivist
- Institutions: University College London; National Archives; British Postal Museum & Archive; Banbury Museum

Helen Forde FSA is an archivist and academic.

== Career ==
Forde taught postgraduate courses on archives at University College London and worked as an archivist in local government and at The National Archive.

Forde was elected as a Fellow of the Society of Antiquaries of London on 14 June 2001.

Forde has served on various administrative and charitable boards. She is a trustee of the British Postal Museum & Archive and served as its Chairperson from 2011 to 2015, is a board member of the Banbury Museum, and has served on the board of the Museums, Libraries and Archives Council.

On 1 July 2019 Forde was re-elected for a further two years as a committee member to the Advisory Committee on National Records and Archives.

== Select publications ==
- Forde, H. 1997. "Preservation policies - who needs them?", Journal of the Society of Archivists 18/2, 165-173.
- Forde, H. 1998. "Preservation and conservation of documents; problems and solutions", Janus, 32-48.
- forde, H. 2002. "Archival training in the United Kingdom - new directions?", In W Stepniak (ed). Archives in the Information Society; papers of the international conference at Popowo. Warsaw, Naczelna Dyrekcja Archiwow Panstwowych. 133-140.
- Forde, H. 2005. "Access and preservation in the 21st century". Journal of the Society of Archivists 2005/2
- Forde, H. 2006. "Access and the social contract in publicly funded institutions". In Gorman, GE and SHep, SJ (eds) Preservation Management for Libraries, Museums and Archives
- Forde, H. 2007. Preserving Archives.
