= Archival appraisal =

Process of examining a body of records to determine its value for an archival library

In archival science and archive administration, appraisal is a process usually conducted by members of the record-holding institution (often professional archivists) in which a body of records is examined to determine its value for that institution. It also involves determining how long this value will last. The activity is one of the central tasks of an archivist, to determine the archival value of specific records. When it occurs prior to acquisition, the appraisal process involves assessing records for inclusion in the archives. In connection with an institution's collecting policy, appraisal "represents a doorway into the archives through which all records must pass". Some considerations when conducting appraisal include how to meet the record-granting body's organizational needs, how to uphold requirements of organizational accountability (be they legal, institutional, or determined by archival ethics), and how to meet the expectations of the record-using community.

While archival collecting is sometimes equated with appraisal, appraisal is still seen as a critical function of the modern archival profession, even though it has been argued that historical societies contribute to the "general randomness of collecting", which stands against rigorous appraisal standards even as many collecting programs still "acquire the collections of private collectors" and some aspects require partnerships between varied institutions. Appraisal is important in order to maintain cultural heritage for future generations and can provide a legal record for those concerned about their human rights.

== Overview ==
Appraisal is considered a core archival function, along with acquisition, arrangement and description, preservation and access. The official definition from the Society of American Archivists (SAA) is as follows:

In an archival context, appraisal is the process of determining whether records and other materials have permanent (archival) value. Appraisal may be done at the collection, creator, series, file, or item level. Appraisal can take place prior to donation and prior to physical transfer, at or after accessioning. The basis of appraisal decisions may include a number of factors, including the records' provenance and content, their authenticity and reliability, their order and completeness, their condition and costs to preserve them, and their intrinsic value. Appraisal often takes place within a larger institutional collecting policy and mission statement.

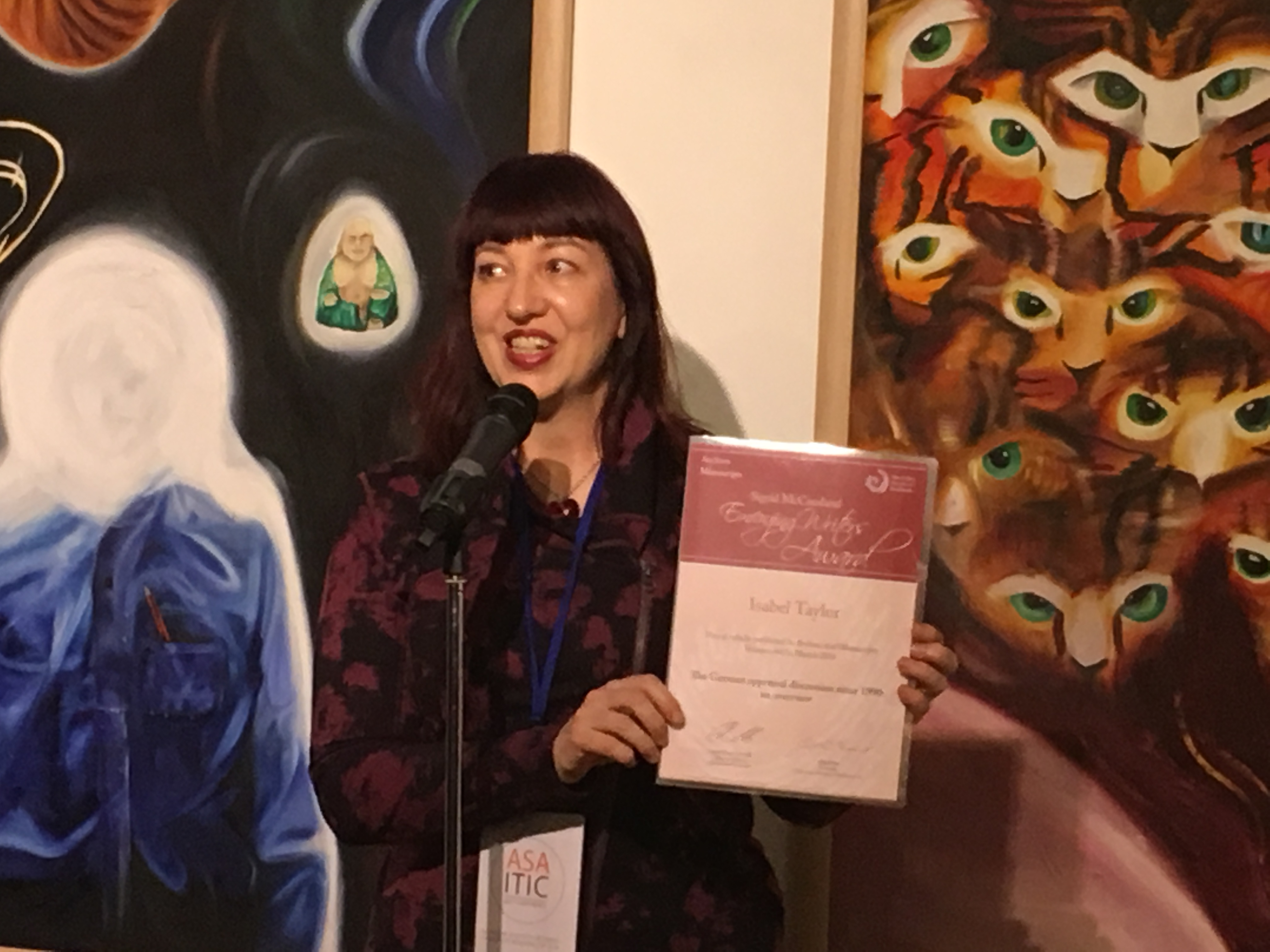
Dr. Louise Trott, announcing the winner of the Archives & Manuscripts Sigird McCausland Emerging Writers Award, Isabel Taylor, for her work, The German Appraisal Discussion since 1990: an overview

The SAA also says, in their "Guidelines for College and University Archives", that appraisal should be based on the mission statement of the archives and that archivists, using appraisal, will determine what records belong in the archives, based on the "long-term administrative, legal, fiscal, and research value" of the records themselves. They also note that archives will obtain the appropriate records that meet appraisal criteria, and that using the appraisal criteria, archives will develop a regularly updated, written acquisitions policy. Others have described appraisal as a unique skill that archivists bring to the table, especially when it comes to maintaining records and data, with problems when organizations have engaged in appraisal when they didn't have trained archivists on staff.

Appraisal can be viewed as a balancing act between the demands of administrative and heritage objectives; between the context of creation and the use of records. Depending on the degree of her or his autonomy to make appraisal decisions, an archivist's role is more or less central to the memory of an institution or society. Jacques Grimard sees archivists as participating in the "management of the world's memory" in three ways, by developing, preserving and communicating memory. In Luciana Duranti's view, appraisal is an analogue for the archival profession as a whole. It is the duty of the profession to "act as a mediator between those who produce archives and those who use them, as a facilitator of public memory making and keeping". She is cautious in her use of the term value in the context of archives, if establishing value means compromising the relationships between documents and the "impartial societal evidence" they might convey to future generations. Other archivists have argued that appraisal is not only one of the acts of record creation, but it requires the impossible in that the archivist is looking into the future, making judgements "as to what information will be of value to researchers". Furthermore, other scholars have argued that appraisal allows for the real or perceived value of records to be determined, that value judgments are made by archivists, based on historical context and their personal beliefs, when they engage in appraisal, although the latter has been contested, and that seeing "naturalness" and "utility" in records upsets existing archival appraisal theory. Whether this argument is accepted or not, a professional assessment which constitutes appraisal, requires specific knowledge and careful planning. It cannot only can be linked with records management but with documents management as part of this analytical procedure. In the process, archival appraisal theories can be consulted, especially in the case of random sampling and elimination of records, which have short-term or routine uses, from consideration as possible records within an archival institution, since they are not inactive records.

== History of appraisal theory ==
=== Muller, Feith & Fruin: the Dutch Manual, 1898 ===
Mostly concerned with the records of government bodies, the Manual for the Arrangement and Description of Archives: Drawn up by the Netherlands Association of Archivists (1898), commonly referred to as the "Dutch Manual", assumed, generally, that the archives would keep each record it acquired. The authors articulated concepts of provenance and original order that privileged an "organic bond" in a collection that precedes its transfer to an archival repository. Appraisal decisions that involve selecting individual records or groups of records for exclusion would consequently lie outside the responsibilities of the archivist, in their view.

=== Sir Hilary Jenkinson, 1922 ===
Sir Hilary Jenkinson was a British archivist and Deputy Keeper of the Public Record Office upon his retirement. His great contribution to appraisal theory is his Manual of Archive Administration (1922; revised 1937; reissued 1965) in which he argued that archives are "documents which formed part of an official transaction and were preserved for official reference". For Jenkinson, the records creator is responsible for determining which records should be transferred to the archives for preservation. Since in his view records are "impartial", the task of selection is merely a matter of choosing documents that best describe "what happened".

Jenkinson staked out a limited role for the archivist, positioned between the administrative body transferring the records and the researcher who might seek to access them. The archivist, according to Jenkinson, is to act as a steward of the records in his or her custody. Neither the archivist nor the historian is competent to make appraisal decisions. That process should be left to the donor. Jenkinson deals directly with destruction of records, which he sees as solely the purview of the creator of those records. As long as destruction is done in accordance with the needs of its "practical business" and the agency of origin refrains "from thinking of itself as a body producing historical evidence", its actions should not, in Jenkinson's view, be considered illegitimate, even by succeeding generations.

In 2010, scholar Richard J. Cox noted that many archivists still cling to Jenkinson's ideas on appraisal, which claims objectivity in appraisal because record creators engaged in “selection decisions” rather than archivists.

=== T. R. Schellenberg, 1956 ===
T. R. Schellenberg's work in Modern Archives (1956) represents a departure from Jenkinson's approach, necessitated by the advent of mass duplication and an overwhelming influx of documents into archives. In his work, he divides the value of records into primary values (the original value for the creator; for their administrative, fiscal, and operating uses) and secondary values (their lasting value after they are no longer in current use; for those other than the original creator). He defines evidential value as deriving from the "evidence records contain of the organization and functioning of the Government body that produced them", and informational value as related to the "information records contain on persons, corporate bodies, things, problems, conditions, and the like, with which the Government body dealt". After defining the terms, Schellenberg details the manner in which an archivist could perform appraisal based on these criteria, placing a stress in every case on the importance of research and analysis on the part of the archivist.

According to Schellenberg, informational value is based on three criteria:

- Uniqueness: The information in the record cannot be found anywhere else and must also be unique in form (i.e., not duplicated elsewhere).
- Form: An archivist must, according to Schellenberg, consider the form of the information (the degree to which the information is concentrated) as well as the form of the records itself (whether or not they can easily be read by others, e.g., punchcards and tape recordings would involve the use of expensive machinery to decipher).
- Importance: When appraising records, one must judge records first based on the needs of the government itself, then on the needs of historians/social scientists, as well as local historians and genealogists; he encourages archivists to be wary of records with sentimental value.

Other scholars have added that evidence and information are among the goods that records provide underlines his appraisal model, since it emphasizes evidential and informational values, and that effective records management necessitates an appraisal process. Some have even said that new thinking on appraisal led some to see distinctions between Schellenberg's "evidential" and "informational" values as artificial, while others see the degree of use of records as the only means that acquisition or appraisal can be evaluated.

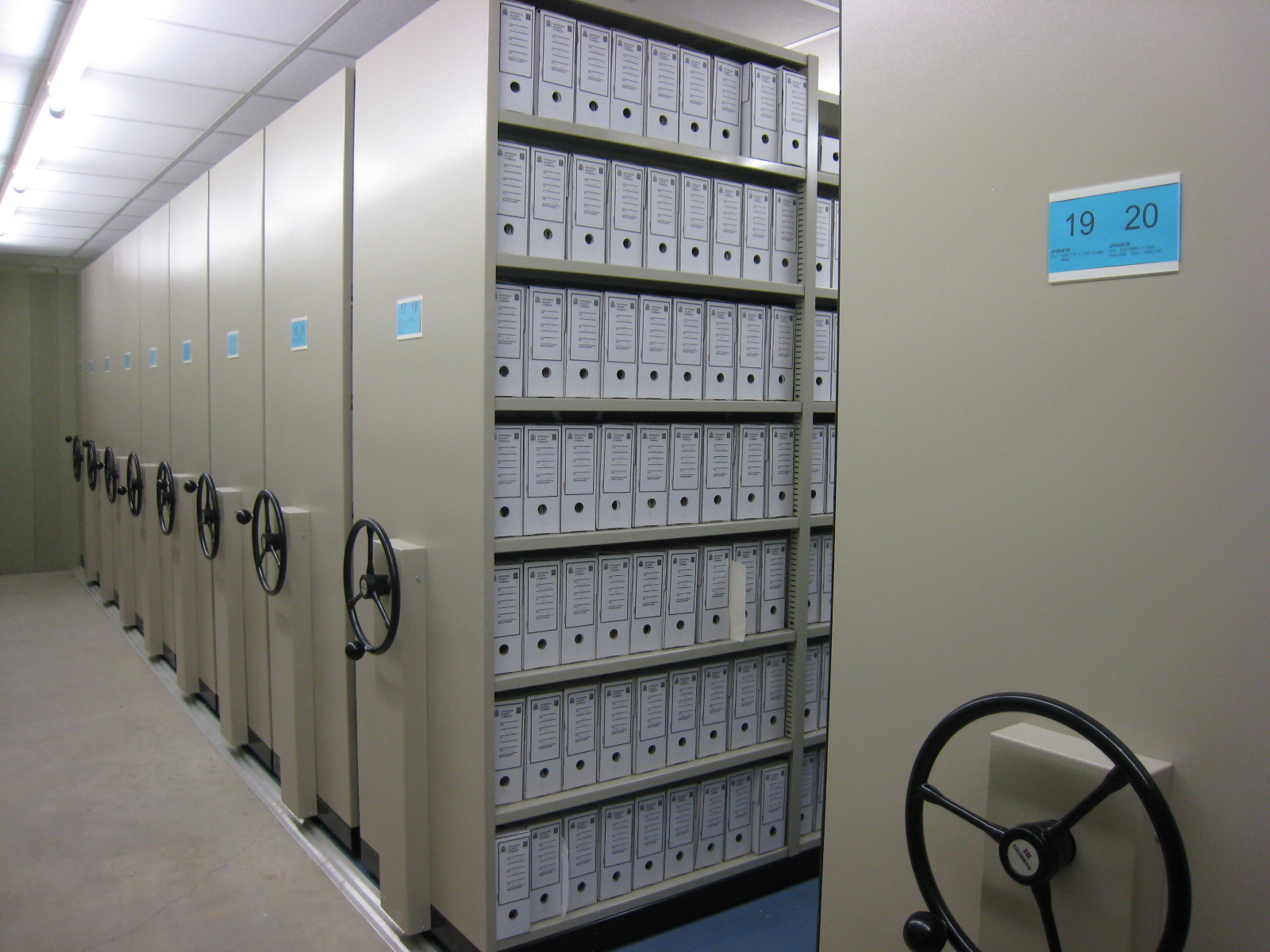
Archive Repository of the Courts of Sant Boi de Llobregat (Network of Judicial Archives of Catalonia)

The archival appraisal theory of Schellenberg was a major factor in the American Friends Service Committee, et al. v. William H. Webster, et.al (1983) case, which began in June 1979 as social action organizations, historians, journalists, and others, sued the U.S. government to stop destruction of FBI files challenging an existing "archival appraisal decision" of the National Archives and Records Administration (then called NARS). In 1986, Susan D. Steinwall, then at the Area Research Center at University of Wisconsin–River Falls, wrote that this case not only warns archivists to not rely too much "on the opinions of nonarchivists", like FBI agents, regarding the usefulness of the records of a specific agency, but it calls into question commonly held archival assumptions. In her article, she describes how the archivists who appraised the FBI records not only relied on Schellenberg's manual, The Appraisal of Modern Public Records, but on FBI reference material and his own experience. Not only did NARS approving disposal requests for the FBI in 1945 and 1946, but it wasn't until 1978 that they reviewed their appraisal decisions of FBI files under "mounting public pressure", and in appraising these records they had relied on the FBI descriptions of their own files, discussing the records they were to dispose with FBI officials before "approving records disposition requests". After bringing in the writings of others in the field of archival appraisal, which was purportedly embryonic in the late 1970s, like Philip C. Brooks, JoAnne Yates, and Maynard Brichford she notes that often Schellenberg is evoked in discussion of appraisal because he provided archivists with vocab to describe documentation's "potential research values." She adds that in his book, The Appraisal of Modern Records, Schellenberg described how "modern public records" have two types of values, one for "immediate use of the originating agency and secondary for later use by other agencies and users", with secondary values considered "evidential or informational", with many larger series of records in the National Archives accessioned for information they "contained regarding matters other than government actions". She ends her article by arguing that this case, often called the "FBI files case", shows that government archivists should reconsider Schellenberg's appraisal philosophy, and notes how some archivists, like Frank Boles and Julia Marks Young, have advocates for not interpreting what Schellenberg says literally, noting that at times, records that have minimal administrative value may have not have, conversely, "minimal value to research."

== Some current approaches to appraisal ==
With social movements in the United States in the 1960s and 1970s, existing Jenkinsonian and Schellenbergian ideas held by archivists began to be shaken, with efforts to broaden historical records beyond "elites and socially dominant groups", leading some to say that social justice was a call for justice for archives and tying it to appraisal itself. Some, within the field, like Tyler O. Walters, have written about how challenging it is for writers in the archival and library field to create preservation priorities and appraisal methods. They have argued that archival managers understand the appraisal methods in setting preservation priorities in their archive, which is the first responsibility. Others have added to this that archivists have long recognized that "their first professional responsibility is to identify and protect the small portion of the overall record that has long-term value."

Some of these changes involved borrowing from experiences of librarians. In 1977, Howard Zinn argued that institutions has ignored "experiences of marginalized peoples", saying they had gaps in their collections which are often "presented as comprehensive representations of social history", following his speech to the Society of American Archivists seven years earlier when he openly questioned the "notion of archival neutrality". Apart from Zinn, Hans Booms also discussed, as did others, the societal role of archivists and how they influence appraisal, with some even posing feminist analysis of appraisal which bolstered social inclusion, placing archivists within ever-changing community dynamics. There have also been scholars who have emphasized the importance of appraising personal archives because they show an individual's character and attitude that theories like macro-appraisal do not account for, necessitating more of an "archives of character than of achievement", with efforts to document our "complex inner humanity" rather than what is on the surface. One of the outgrowths of social change during that period and "rethinking" of archival principles, including of business records, was macro-appraisal in Canada and documentation strategy in the U.S., along with archives that reflect specific social issues and communities, reflecting a changing interest by archivists in "documenting the wider society" and a need to properly document not only society but "public interaction with state institutions".

=== Macro-appraisal ===
Terry Cook, a Canadian archivist, argues that North American appraisal theory is unplanned, taxonomic, random and fragmented, and has rarely embodied the concepts of institutional and societal dynamics which would lead archivists to a working model that would allow them to appraise the broad spectrum of human experience. His model is a top-down approach, which focuses on key processes through which a particular function is expressed by intersecting with structures and individuals.

Macro-appraisal is distinguished from micro-appraisal in that the former seeks to appraise the institution by understanding the context of creation and the interrelationships between, for instance, the different ministries or agencies within a government. In Cook's view, this institutional understanding should precede and inform the latter, micro-appraisal; the appraisal of documents. His approach to macro-appraisal does not just derive from the position of the creating body within an established hierarchy. It is not top-down in a conventional, bureaucratic sense. It is top-down in that it moves from macro to micro-appraisal.

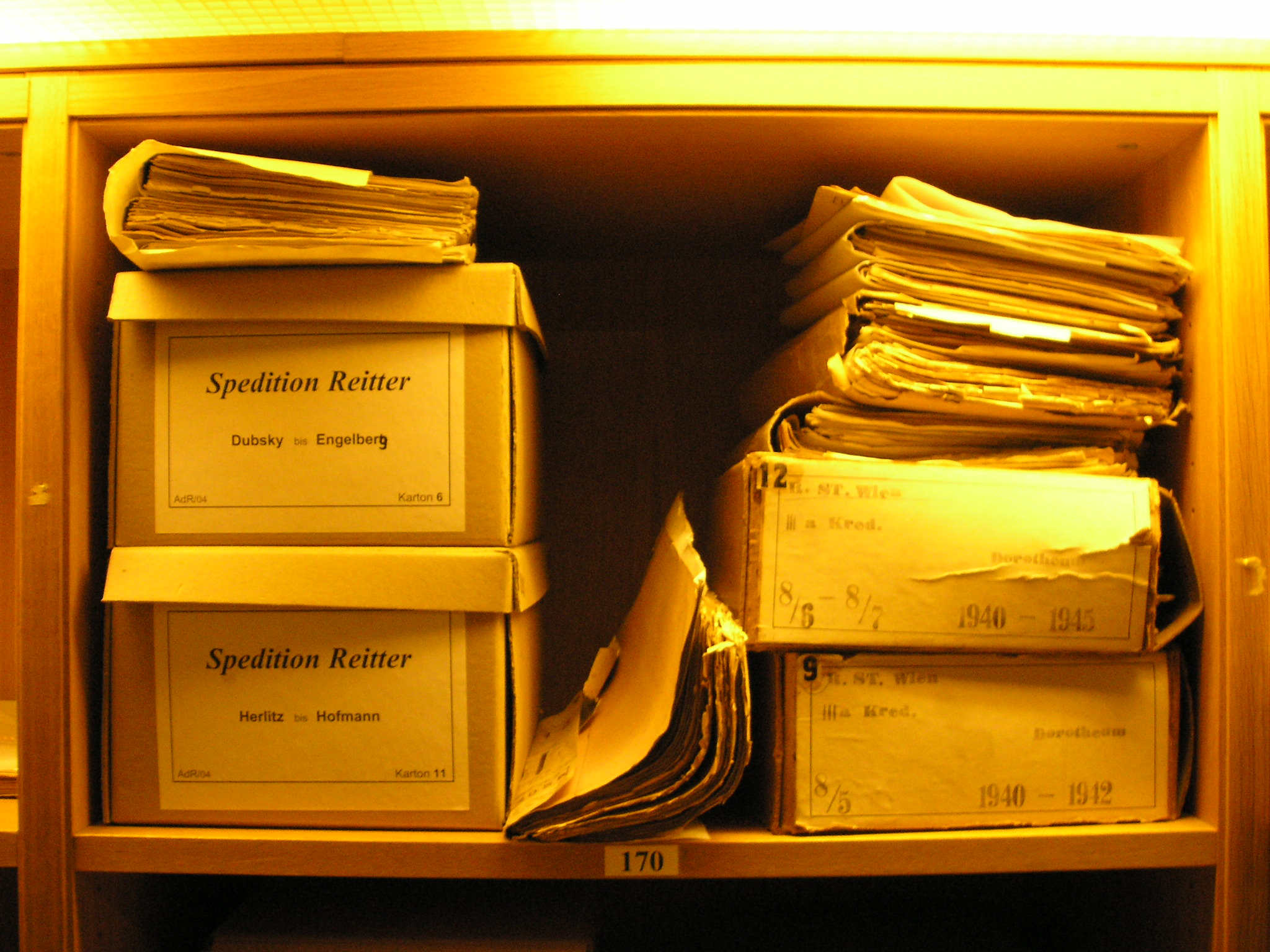
The Austrian State Archives in the Erdberg district of Vienna

This requires a planned, logical approach—archivists embarking upon appraisals are equipped with an understanding of the record creator, its mandate and functions, its structure and decision-making processes, the way it creates records, and changes to these processes over time.

Macroappraisal assesses the societal value of both the functional-structural context and the work-place culture in which the records are created and used by the creator(s), and the interrelationship of citizens, groups, organizations – the "public" – with that functional-structural context. If appraisal designates the long-term value of the context of records, or series of records, for their potential research values, macroappraisal assesses the significance of the context of their creation and contemporary use.

— Terry Cook, "Macroappraisal in Theory and Practice: Origins, Characteristics, and Implementation in Canada, 1950–2000"

The benefits of this process are theoretical (identifying the important functions in society which should be documented) and practical (the ability to focus appraisal activities on records of the highest potential archival value).

Cook also argued that in any appraisal model archivists need to remember the people who slip through the cracks of society, with the voice of marginalized groups often only heard and documented through "their interaction with such [white, male, and capitalist] institutions and hence the archivist must listen carefully to make sure these voices are heard". Julie Herrada, an archivist, added to this by noting there is value in collecting contemporary material and noted that sorting and weeding of records is best "left up to the archivist during the appraisal process".

=== Documentation strategy ===
Connected with the writings of Helen Willa Samuels, documentation strategy aims to reach beyond institutional frameworks when appraising collections. In the past, she says, archivists have been passive, concentrating on researchers’ needs rather than understanding a document in context. This has led to a circular problem, as researchers state their needs based on the context that they deduce from the archives, and as the archives create an artificial context based on researchers’ stated needs. "Archivists are challenged to select a lasting record", Samuels says, "but they lack techniques to support this decision making" (1992). Samuels argues that while archivists once needed to know and understand the complex bureaucratic structures of organizations, they must now understand the structures between organizations and ignore institutional boundaries.

However, this is increasingly impossible; archivists need to examine documentation in a comprehensive manner. A documentation strategy is, then, "a plan formulated to assure the documentation of an ongoing issue, activity or geographic area". Its development includes records creators, archivists, and users, and it is carried out through a system-wide understanding of the intended life-cycle of the record.

=== Appraisal and the digital world ===
Within the archival field, there has been some debate about how to engage in appraisal in the digital realm. Some have argued that effective appraisal, which prioritizes acquisitions by archival institutions, is part of a coordinated approach to data, but that criteria for appraisal should incorporate accepted "archival practice", assessing not only significance of data to the research community, but significance of data source and context, how materials would complement existing collections, uniqueness of data, potential usability of data, and "anticipated cost of processing". Additionally, others have described appraisal and selection by web archives as including selection of materials to be digitally "captured" and URLS where a "web crawler will start", which fits with those who argue that the capacity to make appraisals in the "context of online representation and interpretation" is becoming possible. At the same time, some scholars have said that digitization of records may influence decision-making of appraisal since the greatest proportion of users for archives are generally family historians, often called genealogists, leading to implications for future record-keeping and entailing that digitization be clearly defined as just one component of appraisal which is "appropriately weighed against other considerations". Other informational professionals have also connected appraisal to digital curation of data, saying that one of the key areas of digital curation and digital preservation is selection and appraisal of materials.

=== Appraisal and the question of community archives ===
Apart from macro-appraisal, documentation strategy, and debate about the place of appraisal in the digital world, there has been questions of how appraisal relates to the phenomenon of community archives, or archival institutions which are run by and for the communities they serve, rather than a government or other external entity. Scholars are divided on approaches archivists should take, some saying that appraisal not only needs to be reframed when looking at community archives, while others say that communities should directly be enabled to participate in the appraisal process, defining what they see as valuable records, rather than having the archival profession take up this mantle. The latter was the case with a community archive documenting police brutality in Cleveland, Ohio, with scholars noting that citizen archivists maintain responsibility over management and direction of this people's archive, specifically as it pertains to outreach and appraisal of the archive itself, describing not only the archives' purpose but its construction. Even though, two archivists, Katie Shilton and Ramesh Srinivasan, proposed a "participatory archiving model" in 2007 in an effort to re-orient archival concepts such as provenance, ordering of records, and appraisal, hoping that it would help alleviate some representation by multicultural communities, this model would occur with a "traditional archives" rather than a community archives. They also acknowledged, when proposing this model, that it was labor-intensive and outside scope of most archival institutions.

=== Bias of archivists and appraisal ===
In the archival field, more, like Christian James and Ricardo L. Punzalan, have said that the core archival functions of provenance, original order, appraisal, and arrangement to be inadequate. Part of this change is a focus on bias and value judgments by archivists. Randall C. Jimmerson wrote about this in 2007, archivists need to be conscious of their "potential bias" by not only working to preserve records which are often overlooked but by documenting their appraisal decisions, while recognizing it is impossible to be "neutral or invisible" in archival appraisal. This was in line with what Elizabeth Yakel noted in 2003: the need to re-examine old appraisal decisions, and the suggestion of scholar Richard Cox to attribute appraisal decisions to specific individuals. Despite Jimmerson's suggestions, ten years later scholars were still lamenting that archivists seemed to not document "transformative effects" of their appraisal decisions and recommended that archivists should not only acknowledge their own role in appraisal, but not the appraisal criteria they applied and the assumptions they made in processing and describing records, along with the records they decided to not keep.
