= Anita Wilson (archivist) =

Archivist for Tuvalu, Hong Kong and British royal family

- Anita Wilson, first archivist / librarian for the Government of Tuvalu
- Born: Anita Smith; 1943; England
- Died: 15 August 2006 (aged 62–63); Surrey, England
- Education: University of Manchester, England; University College London, England
- Occupations: Archivist; Librarian
- Employer(s): Government of Tuvalu; Government of Hong Kong; British royal family
- Spouse: John F Wilson (m. 1967; div. 1997)

Anita Wilson (1943 - 15 August 2006) was the first archivist/librarian for the Government of Tuvalu, as well as archivist for the Government of Hong Kong and the British royal family.

== Personal life and education ==
Born Anita Smith, she married John F Wilson in Sutton Coldfield in 1967. They divorced in 1998. Wilson attended Doncaster Girls’ High School. She read history at University of Manchester graduating with a BA (Hons) in history in the mid-1960s. She subsequently completed a postgraduate secretarial course and a Diploma in Archive Administration. She earned a master's degree in Archive Studies from University College London in 1983. Wilson was a committed Christian Scientist and keen choir member.

== Work and travel ==
=== England ===
In 1966 Wilson was a researcher at the Labour Party headquarters in Westminster. After moving to Sutton Coldfield, she taught until 1971, when she joined the Council for Education in World Citizenship, briefly returning to teaching in 1975. She also worked as a school and university librarian.

=== South Pacific and Caribbean ===
In 1976 Wilson's husband was appointed Senior Crown Counsel of the Solomon Islands. The following year they moved to Tuvalu, where the government's records, consisting of nine crates of documents, had been unexpectedly returned prior to the island's independence in 1978. Wilson was appointed as Tuvalu's first archivist/librarian, and worked with the Ministry of Social Services in setting up the Tuvalu National Library and Archives. She corresponded with the Western Pacific High Commission to extract all Tuvalu records from the Western Pacific Archives in order to despatch them to London. In addition to her archival responsibilities, she was asked to establish Tuvalu's first public library, with the support of the British Council's Library Development Scheme.

=== Hong Kong ===
Wilson moved to Hong Kong in 1983. Between 1986 and 1997 she was employed as an archivist for the Government of Hong Kong, helping to ensure the effective handover of records between governments. She headed a unit responsible for transferring to microfilm the Government's policy records from 1945 to 1997. She also identified records relating to Britain's colonial rule that could be transferred to the UK. She was awarded a Governor's Commendation for her work in 1997 and played a role in the Hong Kong handover ceremony on 30 June 1997.

She assisted author Myron Echenberg in the research of his book Plague Ports: The Global Urban Impact of Bubonic Plague between 1894 and 1901.

Wilson was an active member of the Hong Kong Branch of the Royal Asiatic Society. She was Honorary Secretary between 1986 and 1988, and from 1988 to 1997 she was a Council Member, editor of the Newsletter and tour arranger. After leaving Hong Kong she joined the Friends of the Hong Kong Branch of the Royal Asiatic Society (UK), continuing to arrange UK-based tours.

=== Return to England ===
Wilson returned to England in 1997, working briefly for the Public Records Office (now The National Archives) in a part-time role. In 2001 she was appointed to the Royal Archives, based at Windsor Castle. She assisted in archiving the Queen's papers, and those of other members of the Royal Family (except Prince Charles, who had his own archivist). In this role, she worked with the staff of Holyrood House, Sandringham House, and Balmoral Castle.
