= Tonia Sutherland =

American archives scholar

Tonia Sutherland is an American archivist and educator with an expertise in Black archival studies. She conducts research on critical archival studies, digital studies, and science and technology studies. Sutherland earned a master's degree in library and information science in 2005 and a doctorate in 2014 from the University of Pittsburgh. She holds a Bachelor of Arts in history, performance studies, and cultural studies from Hampshire College.

Sutherland is the child of two Caribbean immigrants and grew up in Pennsylvania. She identifies as queer and is a first-generation college graduate.

Her published books include Resurrecting the Black Body: Race and the Digital Afterlife, published by the University of California Press in October 2023.

== Publications ==
=== Books ===
- Sutherland, Tonia (2023). Resurrecting the black body: race and the digital afterlife. Oakland, California: University of California Press. ISBN 978-0-520-38386-9.

=== Book chapters ===
- Sutherland, Tonia; Sturtz, Linda; Kerr, Paulette (April 22, 2022). "Resistance in/and the Pre-Emancipation Archives". In Aarons, John A.; Bastian, Jeannette A.; Griffin, Stanley H. (eds.). Archiving Caribbean Identity: Records, Community, and Memory. London: Routledge. doi:10.4324/9781003105299. ISBN 978-1-003-10529-9.
- Sutherland, Tonia (April 13, 2021), "Introduction to Part III: Freedom Stories", in Leung, Sofia Y.; López-McKnight, Jorge R. (eds.), Knowledge Justice, The MIT Press, pp. 219–222, doi:10.7551/mitpress/11969.003.0016, ISBN 978-0-262-36320-4.

=== Selected articles ===
- Cifor, M., Garcia, P., Cowan, T.L., Rault, J., Sutherland, T., Chan, A., Rode, J., Hoffmann, A.L., Salehi, N., Nakamura, L. (2019). "Feminist Data Manifest-No".
- Sutherland, Tonia (June 5, 2017). "Archival Amnesty: In Search of Black American Transitional and Restorative Justice". Journal of Critical Library and Information Studies. 1 (2). doi:10.24242/jclis.v1i2.42. ISSN 2572-1364.
- Espinal, Isabel; Sutherland, Tonia; Roh, Charlotte (2018). "A Holistic Approach for Inclusive Librarianship: Decentering Whiteness in Our Profession". Library Trends. 67 (1): 147–162. doi:10.1353/lib.2018.0030. hdl:2142/101941. ISSN 1559-0682.
- Sutherland, Tonia (April 28, 2017). "Making a Killing: On Race, Ritual, and (Re)Membering in Digital Culture". Preservation, Digital Technology & Culture. 46 (1): 32–40. doi:10.1515/pdtc-2017-0025. ISSN 2195-2965.
