= Soemartini =

Indonesian archivist and historian (born 1930)

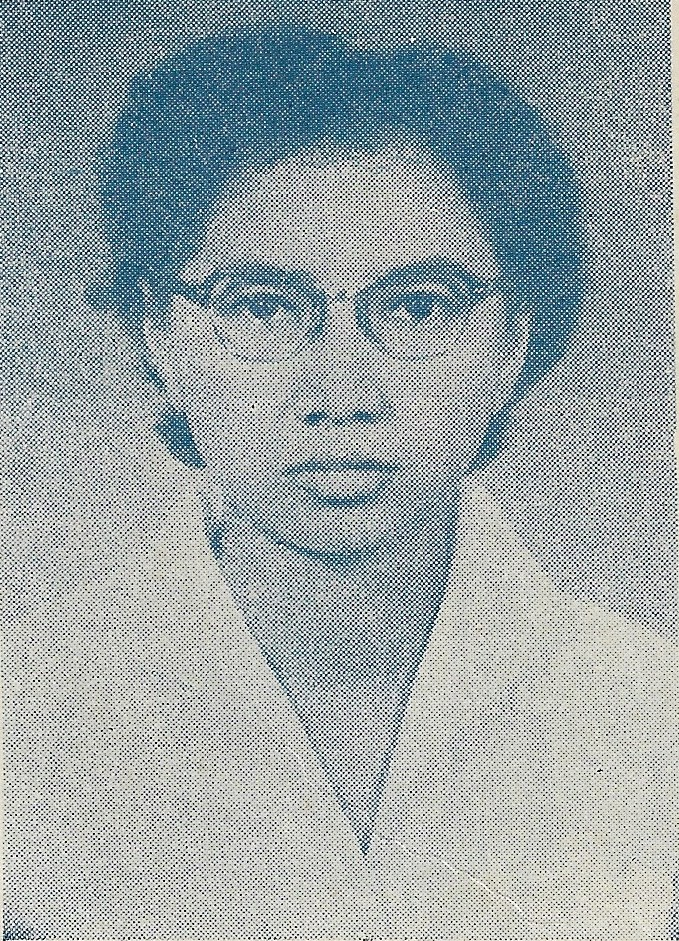
- Soemartini in 1961

Chief of the National Archives
- In office 1970 – 22 January 1991
- Preceded by: Mohammad Ali
- Succeeded by: Nurhadi Magetsari

Personal details
- Born: 17 August 1930 Yogyakarta, Dutch East Indies
- Died: 26 December 2017 (aged 87)
- Education: Gadjah Mada University (dropped out); University of Indonesia (Dra.)

Soemartini (17 August 1930 – 26 December 2017) is an Indonesian archivist and historian who served as the chief of Indonesia's national archives for more than two decades. She was previously a lecturer at the Faculty of Letters of the University of Indonesia and became the inaugural chairwoman of the faculty's alumni association.

== Early life ==
Soemartini was born on 17 August 1930 in Yogyakarta. She was raised in the city, where she completed her primary education in 1943, followed by junior high school in 1946 and high school in 1950. Initially, she enrolled in the Faculty of Law at Gadjah Mada University (UGM), but her interests shifted towards history. Despite her father's preference for her to continue in law, Soemartini pursued her passion and switched to the newly established history department at UGM.

However, her path was interrupted when the history department at UGM was closed due to the repatriation of Dutch professors. Soemartini was forced to transfer to the history department at University of Indonesia (UI) in Jakarta. She faced another challenge when she discovered that the history curriculum at UGM was more aligned with the archaeology curriculum at UI. She chose to restart her studies from the preparatory level.

After graduating in 1961, Soemartini began teaching history at her almamater, becoming the department's chair after a while. Soemartini was then invited by the then-Rector of UI, Soemantri Brodjonegoro, to pursue archival studies in the Netherlands. From 1967 to 1968, she studied at the Rijksarchief School, where she excelled in both paleography and archival studies, earning her diploma in a remarkably short time. She also gained practical experience at the Algemeene Rijksarchief, the Netherlands' archival authority.

== Career ==
Upon her return to Indonesia, Soemartini was offered a position at the National Archives by Soemantri Brodjonegoro. She accepted the offer in 1969 with the condition that she could continue teaching at UI and have a year or two to adjust to the bureaucratic environment of the National Archives. Upon the retirement of the previous director of the National Archives, Mohammad Ali, in 1970, Soemartini was appointed as his successor on the same year. After a year, she became the archive's permanent director.

Soemartini's leadership was marked by a strong commitment to making the National Archives accessible for research. She recognized the lack of qualified personnel and the limited resources available. She secured a small budget of 20 million for the National Archives, emphasizing its importance and ensuring its inclusion in future budget allocations. She also sought assistance from colleagues at UI and UGM, including historians Harsja W. Bachtiar and Sartono Kartodirdjo, to develop archival education programs. She also leveraged a cultural agreement between Indonesia and the Netherlands to establish a collaborative relationship with the Algemeene Rijksarchief. This collaboration focused on exchanging knowledge and resources, including sending Indonesian archivists to the Netherlands for training.

Soemartini's efforts to address the issue of colonial archives held in the Netherlands were particularly noteworthy. She advocated for a joint heritage approach, recognizing the shared historical significance of these records. This led to an agreement where both countries retained their respective archives but had access to copies in the form of microfilms. Her tenure was marked by significant progress in making the archives accessible for research, improving the institution's infrastructure, and fostering international collaboration. She retired in 1989 after 20 years of service and handed over her office to Nurhadi Magetsari, former dean of UI faculty of letters and Mohammad Ali's son, on 22 January 1991.

Soemartini was also entrusted to lead the UI faculty of letters alumni association for more than ten years, with archaeology professor Ayatrohaedi as her deputy. In his memoir, Ayatrohaedi stated that the faculty's alumni association remained dormant during most of her leadership.

== Later life ==
After her retirement, Soemartini focused on teaching history and library and information science in UI. She also managed the Pelita Ilmu foundation, a foundation established by her colleagues and herself to provide sex education to teenagers. On 11 August 2000, she received the Star of Mahaputera, 5th class, from President Abdurrahman Wahid, with the conferment ceremony being held on the Merdeka Palace four days later. Throughout her life, Soemartini was never married, and she lived alone at her house in Pondok Indah. She died on 26 December 2017.
