= Bep Bijtelaar =

Dutch archivist (1898 – 1978)

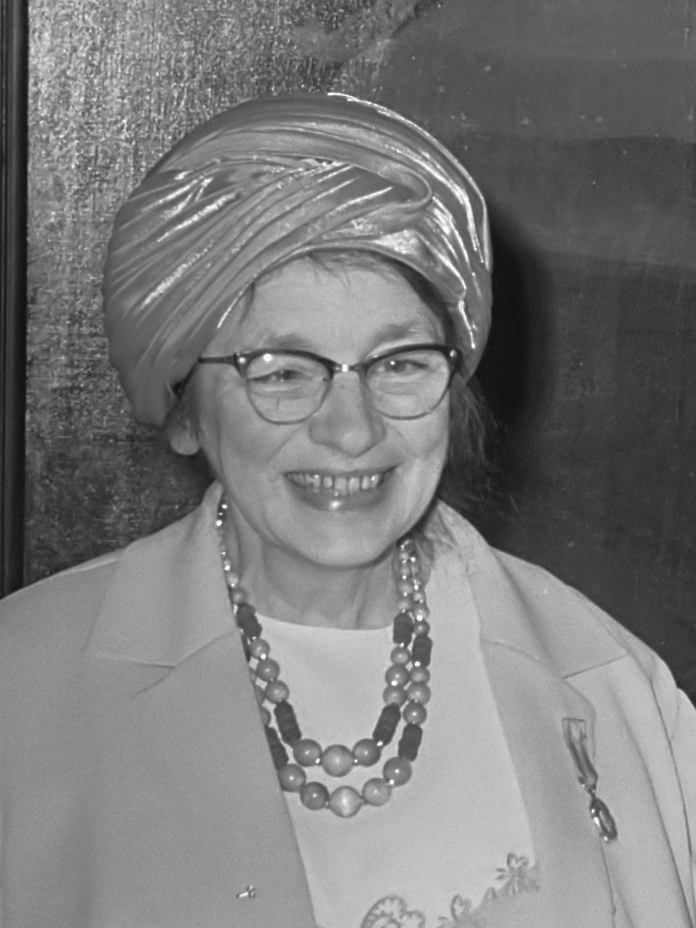
- Bijtelaar at the Silver Carnation award ceremony, 1969
- Born: Barendina Maria Bijtelaar; 23 December 1898; Amsterdam, Netherlands
- Died: 24 October 1978 (aged 79); Amsterdam
- Burial place: Amsterdam, Netherlands
- Occupations: Archivist, historian
- Known for: Saving artifacts from destruction by occupation forces

Barendina Maria (Bep, Betty or Betsy) Bijtelaar (23 December 1898 – 24 October 1978) was a Dutch archivist and artist. She was instrumental in recording old images and saving artifacts in Amsterdam, Netherlands, when occupying Nazi forces threatened their destruction during World War II.

== Biography ==
Bep Bijtelaar was the daughter of the tobacco merchant Cornelis Bijtelaar and Hendrika Willemina Wolff. She was taught at the "School with the Bible for Sloten and Overtoom" at 13 Eerste Schinkelstraat in the present-day Amsterdam district of De Baarsjes. She then learned typing and bookkeeping to qualify for an office job. With the money she earned there, she financed drawing and painting lessons with Gerrit Willem Knap. That was followed with another art course at the school of the Mathesis Scientiarum Genitrix society in Leiden, South Holland.

== Career ==
=== 1934–50 ===
In 1934, after the death of her mother in 1934, Bijtelaar began what would become her first masterpiece: drawing copies of all the gravestones in the Oude Kerk (Old Church) and trying to identify the people buried there ("the stone literature of ecclesiastical building history" as she called it). Her interest had been sparked while taking walks with her father along monuments in Amsterdam.

Another of Bijtelaar's works was mapping and drawing all the bronze bells in Amsterdam after city officials, who were aligned with the occupying forces of Nazi Germany, wanted to remove them during World War II. Working closely with Jan Belonje, she was instrumental in saving all eleven bells requisitioned in Amsterdam by inventing a story that the entire Calvinist church would probably have to be demolished to remove its bells. In 1947, her self-illustrated book De zingende torens van Amsterdam (The singing towers of Amsterdam) about her research was published.

She became a member of the Genootschap Amstelodamum (Amsterdamum Society) and wrote a story about "Two glasses with coats of arms of mayors in the Oude Kerk in Amsterdam" in 1949. She also gave lectures in and about the church. There is a painting by her of the interior of the Westerkerk in the Prinsenhuis next to the church.

=== 1950–69 ===
In 1951, Bijtelaar was appointed to a building committee that had to supervise the renovation of the Oude Kerk, which was then in a deplorable state. She went to the municipal archives and retrieved all the documents concerning the construction of the church. Another investigation yielded the exact burial place of Rembrandt's wife Saskia van Uylenburgh (1642), and she laid thirty roses on her grave in her memory. On Bijtelaar's initiative, the stone was inscribed. Another discovery of hers was that Bishop Guy of Avesnes from Utrecht had visited the city in 1306 just before 17 September, known in Amsterdam history as the day on which the city's church was consecrated. However, her last articles in Amstelodanum were about the new church, called Nieuwe Kerk.

=== 1969–75 ===
In 1969, Bijtelaar received a Silver Carnation Award from Prince Bernard in his Palace on Amsterdam's Dam Square. She lived a large part of her later life in the Dutch Reformed diaconate on Eerste Hugo de Grootstraat (in Amsterdam-West). When the residences that had been built against the wall of the Oude Kerk were renovated in the mid-1960s and Bijtelaar was allowed to move into one of them. Her home had previously housed a sexton's servant so it featured its own passage to the church. Living there, Bijtelaar was able to visit her church anytime, day or night.

In 1974, woodworker Joop van Huisstede chiseled Bijtelaar's portrait into one of the seat supports in the choir during the restoration of the pews of the Oude Kerk. She is shown wearing a suit and cap.

== Death and funeral ==
On 24 October 1978, two months before her 80th birthday and shortly before the restoration of her beloved Oude Kerk was completed, Bep Bijtelaar died in the hospital that's now called Wilhelmina Gasthuis, but her funeral caused problems. Bijtelaar never married and had wanted to be buried next to her parents but that cemetery, Huis te Vraag, had already been closed in 1962. Likewise, a new grave in the Oude Kerk could probably not be permitted for legal reasons. So, her well-attended funeral service was allowed to take place in that church, but her remains were initially taken to Ouderkerk aan de Amstel. She was buried at De Nieuwe Ooster, but her grave was "cleared" in 1988. She is still commemorated with a memorial stone that cites her valuable archival work. It's located above the inner passage between her former home and Oude Kerk.
