= Hermine Moquette =

Dutch archivist (1869–1915)

Hermine Christine Hélène Moquette (Sluis, 25 April 1869 – Bilthoven, 17 December 1945) was a Dutch historian and one of the first female archivists in the Netherlands. She worked more than 30 years at the Rotterdam Municipal Archives and her research on Dutch women was widely published.

== Biography ==
Moquette was born in Sluis (Zeeland), as the daughter of Frédéric Jules Pierre Moquette (1836–1915), a minister and abolitionist, and Rudolphina Johanna Krijt (1840–1928). The Moquette family including Hermine and her three brothers and first moved to Hijkersmilde (Drenthe) and later to Sneek. In 1882, Hermine went to the municipal grammar school, after which she went on to study Dutch at the University of Groningen. She graduated in June 1898, making her the third woman at that university to obtain a doctoral degree (the first was physician Aletta Jacobs in 1876). Moquette's dissertation concerned the influence of the British novelist Samuel Richardson on the work of Dutch writers Aagje Deken and Betje Wolff. Years later she studied law, but abandoned that field after earning her bachelor's degree in 1909.

=== Archivist ===
In 1898, with her doctoral degree in hand, Moquette moved to Rotterdam, where her parents were already living. As was customary for female university graduates, she became a teacher at a girls' school. During this period, she met deputy municipal archivist Mr. W.F. Bezemer and became interested in the archival profession. Not long after, she applied for the position of deputy municipal archivist that resulted from Bezemer's death. When she was rejected, she volunteered her services as an 'unpaid employee' at the Rotterdam Municipal Archives. She started that position in March 1899 and after one year she had worked her way up to temporary civil servant with the rank of deputy archivist. Her work consisted largely of making inventories. In 1904 she completed the inventory of the Holy Ghost Home archive and in 1907 that of the Orphanage archive.

In 1901, Moquette was admitted to the Association of Archivists in the Netherlands (VAN). Before her membership, this association consisted exclusively of male members. Because she experienced for herself how women were disadvantaged in the archive profession, she encouraged women through publications in De Hollandsche Lelie not to be inferior to men in terms of education, because she had noticed that in cases of equal suitability men were often given preference.

Moquette did considerable research into the history of Rotterdam. For the Nieuw Nederlandsch Biografisch Woordenboek she wrote biographies of famous Rotterdammers and she was co-author of Rotterdamsche Straatnamen, historischegelegd (1910). For the exhibition De Vrouw 1813–1913, she was also the author of a two-part publication, Domestic Life and Social Life, about the history of women in the Netherlands from 800 to 1800. She occasionally gave lectures and published historical articles based on current events in daily and weekly newspapers. She retired from her position at 60 on 1 May 1929.

=== Personal life ===
After her retirement, she moved to The Hague. She lived there with her youngest brother and together they made trips to Switzerland, France, and the North Cape, Norway. In 1942 they moved to Utrecht, where her oldest brother and his wife also lived. Moquette remained unmarried.

During the years of World War II, she was greatly disturbed to learn of the German bombing of her old hometown of Rotterdam as well as the failure of Dutch forces to stop the advances of Nazi troops. Two of her brothers died during the Dutch Hunger Winter (1944–1945) that resulted from the Nazi occupying forces. Moquette then moved to Bilthoven. A few months after the country's liberation from the Germans on 17 December 1945, she died at 76.

In the Prinsenland district of Rotterdam, a street was named after her on 21 April 1992 (Hermine Moquettestraat).

== Selected publications ==
She published her research under her full name: Hermine Christine Hélène Moquette. She was widely published in the New Dutch biographical dictionary as well as the magazine Neerlandia, published by the General Dutch Association.

- Hermine C. H. Moquette (1898). On the Novels of Wolff and Deken Considered in Connection with the Romantic Creations of Richardson. Archived from the original on 7 August 2020.
- J.M. Droogendijk, HCH Moquette (1910). Rotterdam street names explained historically. WL & J. Brusse, Rotterdam.
- Hermine CH Moquette (1915). The Woman. Part 1: Domestic Life. Archived from the original on 4 August 2020.
- --- (1915). The woman. Part 2: Social Life. Archived from the original on 9 August 2020.
