= Judith Hornabrook =

Chief Archivist (1972–1982) of New Zealand

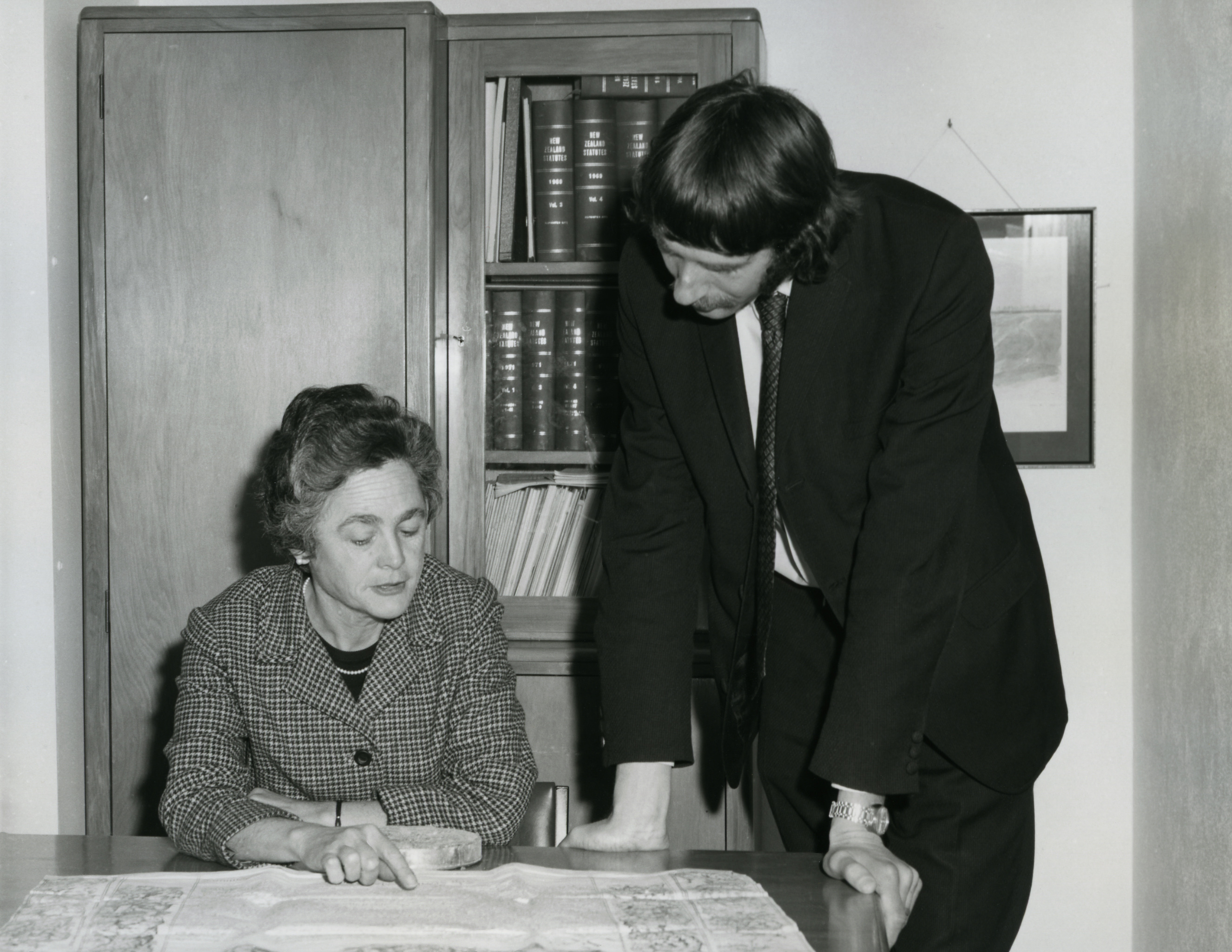
- Born: 8 October 1928
- Died: 3 July 2011 (aged 82); Wellington
- Education: Victoria University of Wellington
- Occupation: Archivist

Judith Sidney Hornabrook (26 October 1928 – 3 July 2011) was the Chief Archivist of New Zealand at the Archives New Zealand from 1972 until 1982.

== Career ==
After World War II, Hornabrook earned a position with the New Zealand government in the War History Branch. She then joined the National Archives of New Zealand as a reference archivist. In 1973, Hornabrook was named Chief Archivist of New Zealand at the Archives New Zealand. She left the Archives New Zealand in 1982 to become the Chief Archivist in Papua New Guinea.

Hornabrook published several works related to her professional knowledge and work in national archives.

Hornabrook died on 3 July 2011.

== Selected bibliography ==
- Hornabrook, Judith S; International Council on Archives; Pacific Regional Branch (1987). National Archives and Public Records Services of Papua New Guinea: instructional handbook. Port Moresby, Papua New Guinea: PARBICA.
- Hornabrook, Judith S; New Zealand Society of Genealogists (1980). National Archives of New Zealand: genealogical sources. New Zealand Society of Genealogists.
- Hornabrook, Judith S; International Council on Archives; Pacific Regional Branch (1987). A basic archives handbook for the Pacific region. Port Moresby, Papua New Guinea: PARBICA.
- Hornabrook, Judith (1 January 1978). "New Zealand's Archives". Archivaria. 7: 82–85. ISSN 1923-6409.
- Hornabrook, Judith S. (1977). "Development of archives in New Zealand". In Hill, Richard S.; Walters Hodder, Michael David; National Archives of New Zealand (eds.). Archives and manuscripts: a New Zealand seminar : proceedings of a seminar held in Wellington, 21-26 September 1975. Wellington: New Zealand Library Association for National Archives of New Zealand. OCLC 5172324.
- Hornabrook, Judith (1 August 1976). "New Zealand's war archives". Archives & Manuscripts: 281–284.
- Hornabrook, Judith (1 May 1975). "Thoughts on New Zealand's national archives". Archives & Manuscripts: 103–107.
- Hornabrook, Judith (1 February 1973). "The death of John Dobree Pascoe (1908-1972), Chief Archivist, National Archives of New Zealand". Archives & Manuscripts: 37.
- Hornabrook, Judith (1 November 1972). "Sources for Australian history in the National Archives of New Zealand". Archives & Manuscripts: 2–7.
- Hornabrook, Judith S (1951). New Zealand and the Tonga Defence Force, 1939-1945: being a thesis in history presented for the degree of Master of Arts. Wellington, N.Z.: Victoria University of Wellington.
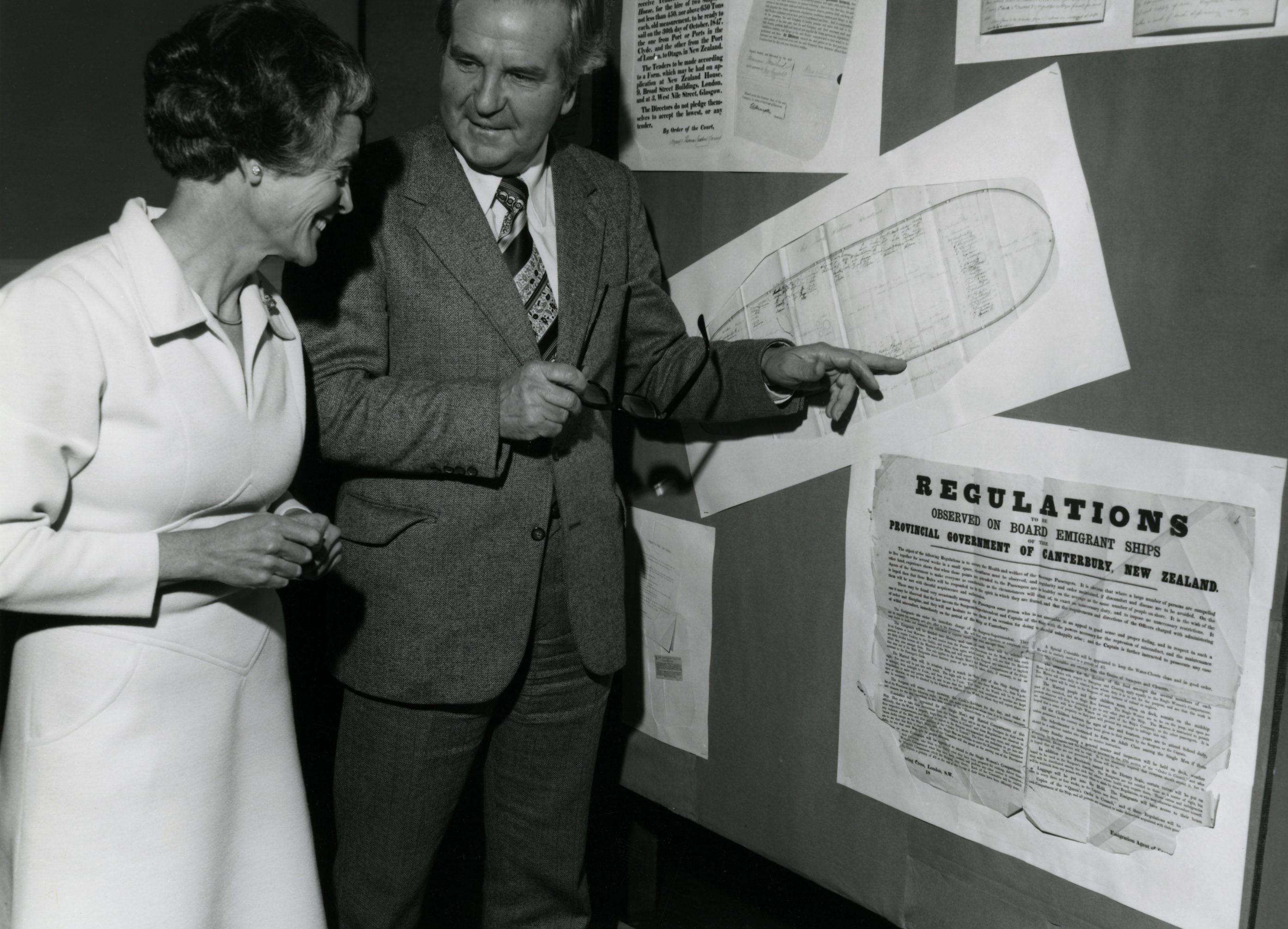
  Judith Hornabrook, Chief Archivist, National Archives with Alan Highet, Minister of Internal Affairs at National Archives Open Day, 24 November 1979

== See also ==
- Archives New Zealand
- National Archives of Papua New Guinea (en français)
