= Margaret M. H. Finch =

American historian

Margaret Maddox Hammond Finch
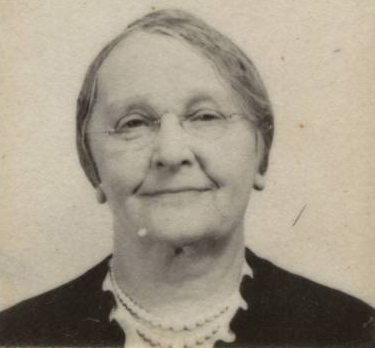
- Finch in 1941
- Born: Margaret G. Maddox; January 6, 1878
- Died: August 3, 1958 (aged 80)
- Occupations: archivist, genealogist
- Years active: 1919–1949
- Employer: National Archives and Records Administration
- Spouses: Rosser Mead Hammond; Erastus M. Finch

Margaret Maddox Hammond Finch (1878–1958) was an American archivist and genealogist. She was an employee of the United States Federal Government from 1919 until her retirement in 1949, where she was an expert in military pension records from the Revolutionary War and the War of 1812.

== Biography ==
Finch was born Margaret G. Maddox on January 6, 1878 to George Edward Maddox and Laura V. Appleby. She began working for the War Department in 1919 after her first husband, Rosser Mead Hammond, died in the influenza outbreak of 1918. She progressed to the Bureau of Pensions in the Department of the Interior where she specialized in pension and bounty-land files from the Revolutionary War and the War of 1812, later becoming the chief of the branch. Finch assisted researchers in securing copies of the pension records and was the main point of contact for historians, genealogists, and academics hoping to access the records in her care. In the 1920s she married Dr. Erastus M. Finch, a doctor and lawyer. In the 1940s, pension records were transferred to the National Archives and Records Administration and Margaret M. H. Finch accompanied them. She was known for being very knowledgeable about the collections, giving regular presentations on their use.

She retired from the National Archives in 1949. Margaret stated that, working with the records, the men, "almost become living people, and their descriptions of battles in which they fought are so real you feel like you've been an actual participator."

Finch died on August 3, 1958, at the age of 80.
