= Anahera Morehu =

New Zealand librarian and archivist

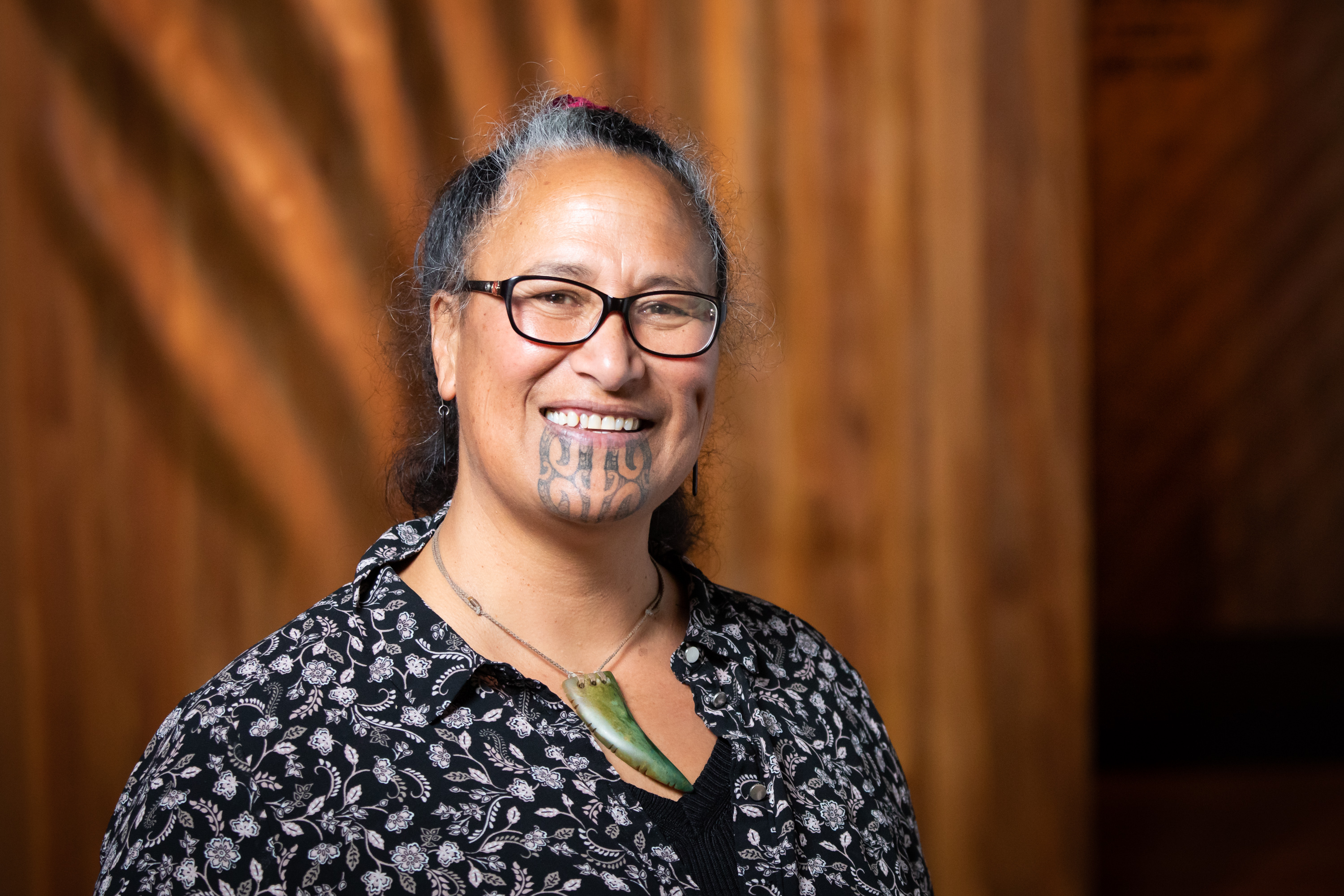

Chief Archivist of New Zealand
- Incumbent
- Assumed office 14 June 2023
- Prime Minister: Chris Hipkins
- Preceded by: Stephen Clarke

Personal details
- Born: Auckland, New Zealand

Anahera Morehu is a New Zealand public servant. As at 2023, she is the Chief Archivist of New Zealand and general manager of Archives New Zealand. She was appointed on 14 June 2023. She had previously been appointed as acting Chief Archivist from November 2022.

Morehu was the President of LIANZA from 2020 to 2021. In the beginning of 2022 Morehu was appointed Kaihautū (Director Rātonga Māori) at Archives New Zealand before being appointed as acting Chief Archivist. At the end of 2022 Morehu was awarded the Te Rau Herenga o Aotearoa LIANZA Life Membership award.
