= Rinskje Visscher =

Dutch archivist (1868–1950)

Rinskje Visscher (10 December 1868 – 26 March 1950) was the first female municipal archivist in the Netherlands and published research about the city of Leeuwarden.

== Biography ==
Known as Rins Visscher, she was born in the village of Akkrum as the youngest of the five daughters of Jan Visscher, a Mennonite minister, and Julia Epkes van Mesdag. She was the niece of Codien Zwaardemaker-Visscher, her father's sister, who was active in the women's movement. She first went to primary school in Akkrum, where she grew up, and then to the French School for a year. In 1881 she moved to Leeuwarden where she attended the Secondary Girls' School (MMS). During that period she lived with her uncle Eilard Attema, a lawyer and deputy of Friesland province, and her aunt Rinskje Epkes van Mesdag (after whom she was named).

Visscher earned her diploma in 1886 and continued her studies to obtain the certificate of primary education and the lower certificates of French, English and German. After gaining these certificates, she taught for a short time in Sneek and Arnhem but she decided that teaching was not for her and moved to Switzerland to study French at the University of Geneva. Back in the Netherlands, she obtained the certificates of Secondary French A and B.

She began working at her first job in 1898, in the antiquarian bookshop of Martinus Nijhoff in The Hague. During this time she wrote the catalog for the National Exhibition of Women's Labor.

=== Municipal archivist ===
On 9 May 1900, Visscher was appointed the municipal archivist of Leeuwarden becoming the first female municipal archivist in the Netherlands. She began her work there on 15 June 1900 and took her oath of office the next day. In the magazine De Vrouw en haar Huis, Johanna Naber wrote that Visscher, by becoming the municipal archivist, 'paved a new path for the development of female intellect, of female labor power'.

During the annual meeting of the Association of Archivists (VAN) on 16 June 1900, it was unanimously decided that Visscher should not be allowed to become a member of the association, because her work was not sufficiently scientific in nature. According to Samuel Muller, chairman of the Association of Archivists (VAN), the only advantage of women playing an active role in the archival world was that it would "make the reputation of dryness and stuffiness disappear when ladies, arch enemies of stuffiness, come to work with us and through their loveliness make a visit to an archive a relaxation and a pleasure." Despite her earlier rejection by VAN, on 19 October 1909 Visscher officially accepted an invitation to become a member after all.

=== Research ===
As an archivist, Rinskje Visscher compiled an inventory of the archives of two medieval hospices and the oldest pious guild in Leeuwarden. She made a new catalog of the City Library and contributed to the Supplement to the Leeuwarden City History by Eekhoff from 1846.

On 24 October 1934, Visscher retired from her duties at age 65 after working as a municipal archivist in Leeuwarden for 33 years. After her retirement, she remained in Leeuwarden and published works on historical subjects for several more years.

In July 1940, she moved to Amersfoort, where she stayed in several boarding houses until her death. She died there on 26 March 1950, at the age of 81 and was cremated at Westerveld, where her ashes were interred in grave 1308747.

=== Honors ===
1940: appointed Knight in the Order of Orange Nassau.

== Selected works ==
- Visscher, Rinskje. Leeuwarden van 1846 tot 1906: een vervolg op Eekoff's geschiedkundige beschrijving van Leeuwarden (Leeuwarden from 1846 to 1906: a sequel to Eekoff's historical description of Leeuwarden). Nijhoff, 1908.
- Visscher, Rinskje. Iets over het muziekleven te Leeuwarden in het begin der 17e eeuw (Musical life in Leeuwarden in the early 17th century). publisher unknown, 1925.
- Visscher, Rinskje. Catalogus der stedelijke bibliotheek van Leeuwarden (Catalog of the City Library of Leeuwarden). Martinus Nijhoff, 1932.
