= List of archival organizations in North America =

List of archival organizations in North America and Canada

This is a list of archival organizations in North America. This directory is maintained by the Regional Archival Associations Consortium (RAAC).

== United States — National Archival Organizations ==
Academy of Certified Archivists

Archivists for Congregations of Women Religious

Archivists of Religious Institutions

Association of Catholic Diocesan Archivists

Association of Moving Image Archivists

Council of State Archivists

Librarians, Archivists, and Museum Professionals in the History of Health Sciences

National Association of Government Archives and Records Administrators

National Episcopal Historians and Archivists

== United States — Regional, State and Local Archival Organizations ==
Archivists of Central Texas

Archivists of the Houston Area

Archivists Round Table of Metropolitan New York, Inc.

Arizona Archives Alliance

Association of Hawai'i Archivists

Association of St. Louis Area Archivists

Capital Area Archivists of New York

Charleston Archives, Libraries and Museum Council

Chicago Area Archivists

Chicago Area Medical Archivists

Chicago Area Religious Archivists

Cincinnati Area Archives Roundtable

Cleveland Archival Roundtable

Conference of Inter-Mountain Archivists

Consortium of Iowa Archivists

Delaware Valley Archivists Group

Greater New Orleans Archivists

Kansas City Area Archivists

Kentucky Council on Archives

Los Angeles Archivists Collective

Louisiana Archives and Manuscripts Association

Maine Archives and Museums

Metro Detroit Archivists League

Miami Valley Archives Roundtable

Michigan Archival Association

Mid-Atlantic Regional Archives Conference

Midwest Archives Conference

Missouri Association for Museums & Archives

New England Archivists

New England Archivists of Religious Institutions

New Hampshire Archives Group

New York Archives Conference

Northwest Archivists, Inc.

Oklahoma Archivists Association

Portland Emerging Archivists

Seattle Area Archivists

Society of Alabama Archivists

Society of California Archivists

Society of Florida Archivists

Society of Georgia Archivists

Society of Indiana Archivists

Society of Mississippi Archivists

Society of North Carolina Archivists

Society of Ohio Archivists

Society of Rocky Mountain Archivists

Society of Southwest Archivists

Society of Tennessee Archivists

South Carolina Archival Association

Southeastern Wisconsin Archives Group

Three Rivers Archivists

Tri-State Catholic Archivists

Twin Cities Archives Round Table

== United States — Archives Institutes ==
Archival Education and Research Institute

Archives Leadership Institute

Georgia Archives Institute

Western Archives Institute

== Canada— National Archival Organizations ==
Association des archivistes du Québec

Association of Canadian Archivists

Canadian Council of Archives/Conseil canadien des archives

== Canada — Provincial and Local Archival Organizations ==
Archives Association of British Columbia

Archives Association of Ontario

Archives Council of Prince Edward Island

Archives Society of Alberta

Association for Manitoba Archives

Association of Newfoundland and Labrador Archives

Council of Nova Scotia Archives

Réseau des services d'archives du Québec

Saskatchewan Council for Archives and Archivists
