= Elizabeth Drewry =

Elizabeth Drewry may refer to:

- Elizabeth B. Drewry (1907–2000), American archivist
- Elizabeth Simpson Drewry (1893–1979), American politician from West Virginia
