= Yedlin =

Yedlin is a surname. Notable people with the surname include:

- DeAndre Yedlin (born 1993), American soccer player
- Pablo Yedlin (born 1966), Argentine physician and politician
- Steve Yedlin (born 1975), American cinematographer

== See also ==
- Hedlin
