= Andrea Hinding =

American archivist

Andrea Hinding (born July 15, 1942) is an American archivist and historian. She served as the curator of the University of Minnesota Elmar L. Andersen Library and was elected fellow of the Society of American Archivists in 1977. Her two-volume work Women's History Sources: A Guide to Archives and Manuscript Collections in the United States (1979) significantly shaped the study of women's history and archival practices relating to sources about women throughout the 1980s and 1990s.

== Early life and education ==
Hinding grew up in the American Midwest, as the eldest child of a Danish father and Slovenian mother. She began studying journalism at Marquette University, Wisconsin, before moving to the University of Minnesota in the early 1960s. In 1966, she graduated in history magna cum laude, and earned a master's degree in history in 1973.

== Career ==
=== University of Minnesota ===
Hinding was the first staff person and later curator of the University of Minnesota Elmer L. Anderson Library. She also wrote and edited books about archives and history, particularly women's history and feminism, sports and the YMCA. She also published articles through the Society of American Archivists' journal, The American Archivist, and is listed as an editor on many books, journals and directories.

=== Women's History Sources ===
Hinding's two-volume work Women's History Sources: A Guide to Archives and Manuscript Collections in the United States was described by Nan Robertson in the New York Times as "the bible of reference books in women's history". It "shaped scholarship in women's history through-out the 1980s and early 1990s", and "caused many archivists to rethink the way they organized and described their holdings, eventually bringing to light countless women's materials hidden in the papers of husbands, fathers, and sons. It could no longer be asserted accurately that there were few resources for the study of women's history."

=== Society of American Archivists ===
Hinding was elected a Fellow of the Society of American Archivists in 1977, and served on the executive council from 1975 to 1979 and as president from 1984 to 1985. She was a longtime member of the Organization of American Historians and the Midwest Archives Conference, and served on the executive council of the former from 1977 to 1980.

=== Advocacy and Public Life ===
She also served as University of Minnesota representative for women's issues on the Big Ten Conference in the mid-1970s. In 1986, when several University of Minnesota basketball players were charged with sexual assault, she disagreed with university president Kenneth Keller's decision to set up a task force to study the issue, and stated that more decisive action, such as canceling the season or firing the athletic director Paul Giel, should have been taken.

=== Publications ===
- Women's History Sources: A Guide to Archives and Manuscript Collections in the United States, Vols 1 and 2, 1979
- Feminism: Opposing Viewpoints, 1986
- Proud heritage: a history in pictures of the YMCA in the United States, 1988
- Common bonds : a memoir in photographs of the University of Minnesota, 1997
