= Maynard J. Brichford =

American academic archivist (1926–2019)

- Born: Maynard Jay Brichford; August 6, 1926; Madison, Ohio
- Died: December 28, 2019 (aged 93); Urbana, Illinois
- Education: University of Wisconsin–Madison; Hiram College
- Occupations: archivist; historian
- Years active: 43
- Employers: Society of American Archivists; University of Illinois at Urbana–Champaign; Illinois State Archives; Wisconsin Department of Administration; Wisconsin Historical Society
- Spouse: Jane Hamilton Brichford
- Children: 4

Maynard J. Brichford (1926-2019) was an American archivist who served as the 35th president of the Society of American Archivists (SAA). He was a leading academic archivist who established the archives program at the University of Illinois at Urbana-Champaign.

== Life ==
Born in Madison, Ohio in 1926, Brichford attended Hiram College for a year before joining the Navy in 1945. After the war he returned to his studies, graduating with a bachelor's degree in 1948. He then continued his studies at the University of Wisconsin–Madison and received a master's degree in American history in 1951. Following his graduation he worked for a few years at the Wisconsin Historical Society, and as a records manager at the Illinois State Archives and the Wisconsin Department of Administration. During his time in Illinois, Brichford was trained by state archivist Margaret Cross Norton.

In 1963 he became the first archivist at the University of Illinois at Urbana-Champaign, working with the university to make its records accessible to researchers. He also established a manuscripts collecting program, acquiring the collections of the American Library Association and the papers of Avery Brundage. Brichfold also served as a professor of library science at the university and taught courses on archival administration. In the 1970s he took sabbaticals in European archives, bringing European concepts and practices back to the United States. Brichford retired from the university in 1995.

Throughout his career, Brichford was also involved in professional associations such as the Midwest Archives Conference and the Society of American Archivists. He was elected an SAA fellow in 1970, and served as president of the organization from 1979 to 1980.

== Death ==
Brichford died on December 28, 2019, in Urbana, Illinois, and is buried in Connersville, Indiana.

== Works ==
=== Books ===
- Archives & Manuscripts: Appraisal & Accessioning (Chicago: Society of American Archivists, 1977)
- Bob Zuppke: The Life and Football Legacy of the Illinois Coach (Jefferson, N.C.: McFarland & Co., 2008)

=== Articles ===
- "University Archives: Relationships with Faculty," American Archivist 34, no. 2 (1971): 173-181
- "Academic Archives: Überlieferungsbildung," American Archivist 43, no. 4 (1980): 449-460
- "Who Are the Archivists and What Do They Do?" American Archivist 51, no. 1-2 (1988): 106-110
