= Karen Jefferson =

American archivist

- Education: Howard University
- Occupation: Archivist

Karen L. Jefferson is an American archivist who serves as the Head of Archives and Special Collections at the Atlanta University Center. She has been a member of the Society of American Archivists for almost 40 years, serving on the Council from 1997-2000 and receiving the Fellows Award in 2004.

== Education ==
Jefferson earned her Bachelor's Degree in History from Howard University in 1974. In 1975, she earned her Master's in Library Science from Atlanta University.

== Career ==
She started her career as a Library Technician at the Moorland–Spingarn Research Center at Howard University in Washington, DC in 1975. She worked here for 18 years and served as the Curator of Manuscripts from 1987-1993, managing a collection of 60,000 linear feet.

In 1993, Jefferson became the Program Officer in the Division of Preservation and Access with the National Endowment for the Humanities. She worked here for three years, advising applicants and monitoring grants.

She then spent two years working at Duke University in the John Hope Franklin Research Center for African American Documentation. Here she focused on acquisitions. After her two years with Duke, Jefferson moved to the Robert W. Woodruff Library of Atlanta University as the Head of Archives and Special Collections. Here, she holds the responsibility of archives that support Clark Atlanta University, the Interdenominational Theological Center, Morehouse College, and Spelman College.

Since her move to Atlanta, Jefferson has been active in other library and archive organizations. She has worked as an instructor, mentor, author, editor, and committee member. Some of her work has extended to institutions and programs such as the Association of Certified Archivists, SOLINET, the Society of Georgia Archivists, and the Historically Black Colleges and Universities Archives Institute.

In 2003, the University of Maryland awarded Jefferson the James Partridge Outstanding African American Information Professional Award.

=== Society of American Archivists ===
Jefferson helped found the Archives and Archivists of Color Roundtable and served as the co-editor of its newsletter. She has also worked extensively in researching the roundtable and her work is compiled in the unpublished Archivists of Color Directory. When a history of the roundtable was being compiled, Jefferson was quoted in an interview on the importance of diversity to the archival profession: “Archives must ensure that all people are included in the historical record of humankind.”

In 1996/1997, the SAA Council appointed a Task Force on Organizational Effectiveness with one of their main issues being how to address diversity. The Council chose to create a Task Force on Diversity, with Karen Jefferson as a member as well as Kathleen Roe, Susan Fox and Deborah King. The task force was to investigate how the SAA was addressing, or not, issues of diversity. In their discussions, they examined the SAA's organizational structure and how it could change to reinforce existing activities as well as how it could encourage diversity as a whole in the archival profession and the Society.

She has served the SAA in several ways: on the National Historical Publications and Records Commission, Award Subcommittees, the Task Force on Diversity, as a member of the Publications Board, and as part of the Society's Council from 1997-2000.

In 2004, she was one of the recipients of the SAA Fellows Award. In the process of her nomination, her supporters are quoted in H. Thomas Hickerson's blurb on her win:

Perhaps most importantly, she has made SAA a better organization for African American professionals, and has made SAA a better organization as a result. As a kind and caring guide and teacher, she has served as a mentor and a model for young African American information professionals. As a leader in SAA, she has been a wise and forceful presence in the governance of our Society.
