= Bergis Jules =

American archivist and scholar

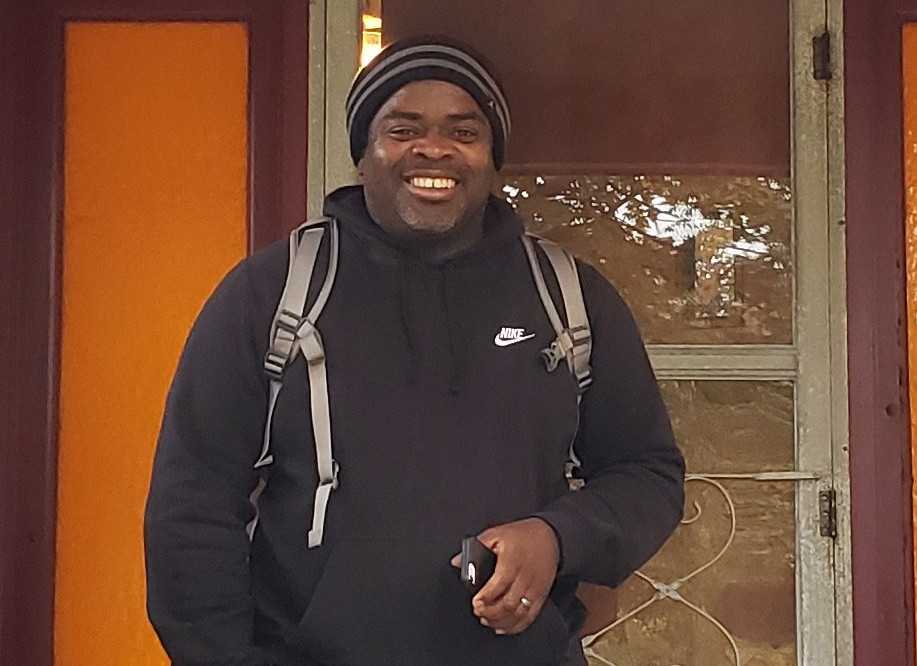
- Bergis Jules photographed outside the Boggs Center in Detroit
- Born: 1981 (age 44–45); Saint Lucia
- Occupations: Archivist, Historian
- Known for: Community Archives, Activism

Bergis Jules is an American archivist and scholar. He is known for digital humanities projects that aim to diversify and democratize the historical record, and for his scholarly research on community-based archives.

Between 2014 and 2018, he served as the university and political papers archivist at the University of California, Riverside. Before that, he was the University Archivist at George Washington University and a project director at the University of Chicago's Black Metropolis Research Consortium. He is currently (as of March 2024) the Director of Equity Initiatives for Shift, a non-profit devoted to designing products to solve social problems, and the Community Lead for the Documenting the Now (DocNow) project.

Jules has received wide attention for and has devoted much of his scholarly and professional activity to DocNow, a set of tools for researchers to work with Twitter data and a community of practice to explore these tools' applications. The project was conceived by Jules and Edward Summers during the 2014 Society of American Archivists Conference, which coincided with the shooting of Michael Brown and subsequent protests in Ferguson, Missouri. Meredith Evans also joined the project as a partner. Within six days of the shooting, Summers created a tool to capture and archive tweets referencing the protests. The project garnered some immediate criticism, about privacy, intellectual property, and ethical issues around collecting social media posts, such as whether the collected posts might be used for police surveillance purposes, which has prompted Jules to explore and promote conversations around these issues.

Jules holds a B.A. in African-American and African Studies from Earlham College and an M.A. in African-American and African diaspora history, an M.L.S. from Indiana University Bloomington, and a Ph.D. in History from the University of California, Riverside.

He has been a project lead or partner on grant-funded projects totaling several millions of dollars and has received multiple fellowships, including an Institute of Museum and Library Services National Leadership Grant for Libraries; the 2018–2020 Paul Evan Peters Fellowship, which supports outstanding scholars of library and information science; and two separate grants amounting to $1.7 million from the Andrew W. Mellon Foundation to support DocNow and communities looking to create their own digital projects.

In 2007, Jules received the Society of American Archivists' Harold T. Pinkett Student of Color Award. Jules was a 2008 American Library Association Spectrum Scholar.

He was elected to a three-year term on the Society of American Archivists Council between 2015 and 2018.
