= Elizabeth B. Drewry =

American archivist and head of FDR Presidential Library

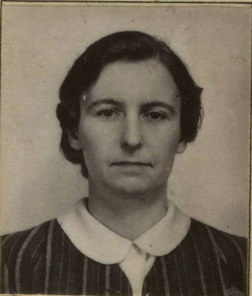
- Drewry in 1941
- Born: 1907
- Died: January 5, 2000 (aged 92–93); Gaithersburg, Maryland, U.S.
- Education: George Washington University (AB, MA), Cornell University (PhD 1933)
- Occupation: Archivist

Elizabeth Belle Drewry (1907 – January 5, 2000) was an American archivist, recognized for her long career at the National Archives and the Franklin D. Roosevelt Presidential Library and Museum. The first woman to become the head of a Presidential library, she was an expert in American World War I history and published Historical Units of the First World War (1942). In 1965, she received a Federal Women's Award, presented personally by President Lyndon B. Johnson for her work at the National Archives.

== Education ==
Drewry was a native of Washington, D.C., and a graduate of Holy Cross High School. She went on to attend George Washington University, where she earned a bachelor's and master's degree, and then Cornell University, where she earned her doctorate. Her thesis dealt with Episodes in westward expansion as reflected in the writings of General James Wilkinson, 1784-1806.

== Career ==
Drewry began her career as the head of the history department at Penn Hall Junior College in Chambersburg, Pennsylvania.

In 1936, she joined the National Archives as a reference supervisor. She spent a quarter of a century with the agency, ending her federal career as chief of the records retirement branch of the Office of Records Management. During the 1950s, she spearheaded an effort to introduce a uniform records retention and disposal system.

Drewry was a specialist in World War I history. Her book, Historical Units of the First World War, was published in 1942 by the Government Printing Office. She also served as an adviser to the Thomas A. Edison Foundation.

After Herman Kahn left the Library to take up a post as Special Assistant to the Archivist of the United States, Drewry stepped into the role of Director. She was the first woman to head a Presidential Library, and served there from 1961 to 1969. From 1963 to 1967 she served as a Council Member of the Society of American Archivists (SAA). She was one of only fourteen women to hold an elected office in the SAA before 1972, when the committee on the Status of Women in the Archival Profession was formed. Drewry was instrumental in the effort to raise funds to expand the Library to house Eleanor Roosevelt's papers; construction was completed in 1972.

After her retirement from the Library, Drewry spent several years as the director of a girls summer camp in Chambersburg, Camp Robin Hood.

== Awards and honors ==
- Federal Women's Award
- Fellow, Society of American Archivists
