= Shonnie Finnegan =

American archivist

Marchand "Shonnie" Finnegan (born 1931) is University Archivist Emerita at SUNY Buffalo. She is known for her work as an archivist through several organizations, namely the SUNY at Buffalo University Archives, the Society of American Archivists and the Mid-Atlantic Regional Archives Conference. She has been heavily awarded and recognized for her work in archives and libraries across the country in speeches and presentations and has written extensively on women's history, local history and the archival profession.

== Career ==
She began working at the University Archives at the University at Buffalo in 1967. She was instrumental in developing the Archives, gathering documents from attics, closets, and other storage spaces. She actively pursued many of the collections that make up the Archives today, including the records of women's history at Buffalo and Western New York. Her work and research in women's and local history and archival organization has helped the University Archives immensely and even led to several papers and presentations.

In 1979, she was awarded the Chancellor's Award for Excellence in Librarianship. During her long career in archives, she also served as a member of the Board of Managers of the Buffalo and Erie County Historical Society. Finnegan also served as Director of the Buffalo Community Studies Group. She was appointed to the New York State Historical Records Advisory Board by Governor Cuomo and served there from 1976 to 1985.

Since 1968, Finnegan has been a member of the Society of American Archivists, making connections that encouraged her to become an active archivist and even co-founding MARAC and LOAC. She has served on many committees and task forces and has been heavily involved in the Committee on Status of Women in the Archival Profession and the Committee of college and University Archives. In 1975, she was elected as a Fellow, the Society's highest honor and from 1980 to 1984, she served on the National Archives Advisory Council as a representative of the SAA. In 1984, Finnegan served as the Society's vice president during Andrea Hinding's term as president, "the first time two women had ever served in succession as SAA VP/President." And in 1985, she began her term as the 41st President of the SAA. While president, she was tasked to plan the monumental 50th Anniversary for the SAA. In her presidential address, she also noted areas of improvement. She specified the Task Force on Archives and Society and the Committee on Goals and Priorities (C-GAP) as two groups that needed the support of SAA members.

She has written and published several articles and books, mainly through the SAA's journal, The American Archivist. Much of her research focuses on women and local history, but she also explores archives and technology.

Throughout her career, she has been heavily involved in programs across the state of New York that began under the leadership of state archivist Ed Weldon, who happened to hire Kathleen Roe early in her career. In 1984, she helped compile the report, "Toward a Usable Past," which along with Government Records programs, helped develop initiatives that continue today. She was also heavily involved in the SUNY at Buffalo Chapter of the American Association of University Professors (AAUP), serving as secretary, vice president and president. Finnegan also worked on the National ad hoc Academic Freedom Investigating Committee.

She retired from her position at Buffalo in 1997, but she remains active in the archival profession the University Archives.
