= Elizabeth W. Adkins =

American archivist (born 1957)

- Occupation: archivist
- Known for: former President of the Society of American Archivists

Elizabeth W. Adkins (born 1957) is an American archivist who was the president of the Society of American Archivists. She was the leading archivist at the Ford Motor Company and Kraft Foods. Since 2015, she has worked at Grant Thornton International as the director of information governance.

== Education ==
Adkins was born in 1957. She attended Binghamton University for her BA in History and attended Carnegie Mellon University for her MA in history.

== Career ==
Adkins spent 11 years as the manager of archives services for Kraft Foods. She also served the Ford Motor Company for 12 years where she led the Global Information Management Program. She became a Certified Archivist, Certified Records Manager, and certified Information Governance Professional.

Adkins was the Society of American Archivists Treasurer from 2000 to 2003, and later served as vice president and president of the society. She also served as chair for the Business Archives Section and has taught the Business Archives Workshop since 1992.

She is also a Certified Archivist and has served the Academy of Certified Archivists as president. She has also served the International Council on Archives and ARMA International. She has served as chairperson of the Northern Virginia chapter of ARMA and has been elected Chapter Leader of the Year for five of the past six years.

Adkins has spoken at several conferences and events on archives. She has also researched and written on archives in publications, including "A History of the Ford Motor Company Archives, with Reflection on Archival Documentation of Ford of Europe's History," "Our Journey toward Diversity—and a Call to (More) Action," and "The Development of Business Archives in the United States: An Overview and a Personal Perspective." She has written essays and reviews for journals including the American Archivist.

In 2015, Adkins moved to Grant Thornton where she was working in 2018.

== Awards and honors ==
- Society of American Archivists Fellow Award, 2002
- Distinguished Service Award from the Academy of Certified Archivists
