= William D. Overman =

American archivist

William Daniel Overman (August 15, 1901 – November 4, 1970) was the state archivist of Ohio and the founding director of the archives of the Firestone Tire and Rubber Company.

Overman was born in Waverly, Ohio, and raised in the area of Columbus. He attended Ohio State University, receiving his bachelor's and master's degrees in 1925 and 1926. He later returned to Ohio State and earned a Ph.D. in American history in 1931. After completing his education, Overman taught for a few years in Pennsylvania before joining the Ohio Historical Society as state archivist in 1934.

In 1937 Overman was hired by Harvey Samuel Firestone to catalog Firestone's papers. He then returned to the Ohio Historical Society, and was also appointed curator at Ohio State University. Then in 1943 Overman became the founding director of the business archives at Firestone Tire and Rubber Company, and is known as the first American business archivist. He remained with the company until his retirement in 1966. Overman died in Akron, Ohio, and was buried in Kenton, Ohio.

Overman was an active contributor to the Society of American Archivists, serving as the organization's president (1957-1958), vice-president (1949-1950), treasurer (1952-1957), and as a council member (1961-1965).
