= Danna C. Bell =

Archivist and librarian at the Library of Congress

- Born: November 17, 1960
- Died: November 19, 2024 (aged 64)

Danna C. Bell (Nov 17, 1960 - Nov 19, 2024) was an archivist and librarian at the Library of Congress. She served as president of the Society of American Archivists from 2013 to 2014, and served on the Advisory Committee on the Records of Congress. She was invited to many national and international events and conferences on archives and special collections, including the ARL/SAA Mosaic Program Leadership Forum in 2016. She was active in the archives profession, writing and speaking on the importance of archival work.

== Education ==
Bell earned her bachelor's in public administration and master's in college student personnel from Miami University, which she attended from 1978 to 1984. She earned an MLIS from Long Island University.

== Career ==
In 1990, Bell began work at Marymount University as a reference librarian and coordinator. In 1993, she left Marymount and began her four-year service at the District of Columbia Public Library as an archivist. She served as the curator of the National Equal Justice Library before becoming an archival consultant at American University's College of Law.

In 1998, she joined the Library of Congress, where she worked in a number of roles. Most notably, she served as a member of the Digital Reference Team and as the educational outreach specialist. Her work appeared in the Southern Poverty Law Center's Teaching Tolerance curriculum.

She wrote several papers, essays, and articles over her career, and presented at conferences, primarily of the Society of American Archivists and the Mid-Atlantic Regional Archives Conference (MARAC). She was the production coordinator for the Teaching with the Library of Congress blog. Bell served as a reviewer for the Library Journal, Educational Media Reviews Online, and the Public History Resource Center. Bell taught the course "Real-World Reference: Moving Beyond Theory" for the Society of American Archivists (SAA).

As president of the Society of American Archivists, Bell worked to include everyone. In an introduction, her mother, Marlyn Jews, said of Bell: "She worked to be inclusive in the development of goals and objectives for [the SAA]. And she championed those goals and objectives."

=== Affiliations ===
Bell was an active member of the Society of American Archivists throughout her career. She served on and chaired numerous committees, including the Nominations and Elections Committee; the Reference, Access and Outreach Section; and SAA Council. From 2013 to 2014, she served as the 69th president of SAA.

She was also heavily involved in the Mid-Atlantic Regional Archives Conference (MARAC). During her career, she served on many committees, including as chair of the professional organization from 2009 to 2011.

Bell was involved in community and church groups as well as local government. She served in leadership positions in many other groups and organizations. She was a board member of the Woodrow Wilson Presidential Library and Museum, including serving as secretary.

=== Death ===
Bell died in November 2024 after suffering a severe bout of pneumonia as a result of COVID-19, according to a shared post on Facebook.
