= Council of State Archivists =

Membership organization for US state and territorial archives

- Abbreviation: CoSA
- Formation: 1989; 37 years ago
- Type: Non-profit; NGO
- Location: Boston, MA
- Region served: United States
- Members: 56
- Executive Director: Joy M. Banks
- President: Kenneth Williams (2022-2023)
- Website: www.statearchivists.org
- Formerly called: Council of State Historical Records Coordinators (COSHRC)

The Council of State Archivists (CoSA) is a non-profit membership association of the United States state and territorial government archives.

Originally established as the Council of State Historical Records Coordinators (COSHRC) in 1989, CoSA incorporated as a non-profit in 2002. Current program priorities include the State Electronic Records Initiative (SERI), publishing guidance on email archiving, and providing a network of support.

In 2018, the Society of American Archivists recognized CoSA with the Distinguished Service Award for the organization's significant contributions to the archives profession.

== History ==
State Historical Records Advisory Boards (SHRAB) were first proposed in 1975 in a report from Herbert Angel to the recently formed National Historical Publications and Records Commission (NHPRC), chaired by the Archivist of the United States. Each SHRAB is led by an appointed State Coordinator. After several years of work and recognizing their need to carry out their mandate across the various archival association missions, the State Coordinators formed the Council of State Historical Records Coordinators (COSHRC) in 1989, maintaining close ties to the NHPRC.

In the early years of COSHRC, membership expanded to include State Historical Records Coordinators and the Deputy State Coordinators. These archival leaders issued many reports to document and guide work related to historical records and archives in coordination with their peers in other organizations, such at the Society of American Archivists (SAA), the National Association of Government Archives and Records Administrators (NAGARA), and the American Association for State and Local History (AASLH).

Under the leadership of Peter Gottlieb (COSHRC Steering Committee Chair, 2000), the Council started planning for its future and its continued relationship with the NHPRC, and in 2002, the work Gottlieb started took shape when COSHRC incorporated as an independent 501(c)(3) organization. The shifting mission and priorities of the group also motivated a name change in 2005 to the Council of State Archivists (CoSA).

Today, the Council supports its mission to "provide leadership to strengthen and support state and territorial archives leaders and staff in their work to preserve and provide access to government records." Research, education, and advocacy remain central to all programs, and representatives from member institutions serve on a variety of committees to accomplish these tasks.

== Awards ==
The CoSA Awards Program provides annual recognition to individuals, programs, and institutions for their contributions to the field of government archives, such as those awarded to Jim Condos, Doug Robinson, and the New Mexico Historical Records Advisory Board.
