= Richard Pearce-Moses =

American archivist and educator

Richard Pearce-Moses is an American archivist and educator. He was president of the Society of American Archivists in 2005–6. He was recognized by the Library of Congress for his work as a Digital Preservation Pioneer. He was the first director of the Master of Archival Studies (MAS) program at Clayton State University.

== Career ==
Before coming to Clayton State, he worked at the Arizona State Library and Archives for nearly twelve years where he served as deputy director for Technology and Information Resources, providing oversight and directing the enterprise architecture for information systems used to manage the agency's library, archival, and other collections, including both physical and electronic holdings. Previously, he held positions as the Director of Digital Government Information and as the Coordinator of the Cultural Inventory Project.

Pearce-Moses worked as Documentary Collections Archivist and Automation Coordinator for the Heard Museum, as Curator of Photographs at the Arizona State University Libraries, and as a Local Records Management Consultant for the Texas State Library. He has a Master of Arts in American Studies from the University of Texas at Austin and a Master of Science in library and information science from the University of Illinois at Urbana–Champaign.

Pearce-Moses has been an active member of a number of research projects, has served as a member of the National Archives' Advisory Committee for the Electronic Records Archives. He is a certified archivist, and was presented with the American Library Association’s Kilgour Award for Research in Library and Information Technology. In 2002, he won an NHPRC Archival Research Fellowship to write A Glossary of Archival and Records Terminology.

He was elected president of the Society of American Archivists in 2005. In 2009, he was recognized by the Library of Congress for his work as a Digital Preservation Pioneer In 2010, he became the first director of the Master of Archival Studies (MAS) program at Clayton State University.
