= Diana Lachatanere =

American archivist

Diana Lachatanere is an American archivist. She retired from the Schomburg Center for Research in Black Culture at the New York Public Library in 2013, where she held the position of assistant director for Collections and Services from 1995 to 2013, and Curator of the Manuscripts, Archives and Rare Books Division from 1988 to 2013. She was also the Manager of the Scholars-in-Residence Program, 1990–2013.

== Education ==
Lachatanere graduated from the City College of New York in 1969 and received her MLS from the University of California, Berkeley, where she also received the Edith M. Coulter Scholarship.

== Career ==
Lachatanere began her career in archives and libraries in 1976 with the California Historical Society in San Francisco. Starting as a processor, she became the Assistant Manuscripts Librarian in 1978 while also earning her MLS degree.

=== Schomburg Center for Research in Black Culture ===
In 1980, she started at the Schomburg as the Assistant Archivist in the Manuscripts, Archives and Rare Books Division, and became Curator of that Division in 1988. Lachatanere worked at Schomburg in various roles, including assistant director of Collections and Services and Manager of the Scholars-in-Residence Program. While managing collections at the Schomburg, she assisted in the planning of Center-wide exhibitions and co-authored/ supervised National Endowment for the Humanities funded processing grants.

She has served as a consultant on many different archival programs including the Center for Black Music Research; Institute for the Study of History, Life and Culture of Black People at Jackson State University; Jazz Heritage Project at Medgar Evers College; and the Cuban Archives Project of the Cuban Research Institute, Florida International University.

=== Involvement with SAA ===
Lachatanere's first Society of American Archivists meeting was in 1978 when the meeting was held in Nashville, TN. Ann Allen Shockley, the librarian and archivist at Fisk University, had served on the Program committee and shepherded several sessions which included African American panelists. During the conference she invited "all of us, all of the young, people of color to her house for dinner ... She made it very clear that this was the first time the Society had had this number of black people there." However, it wasn't until 1981 that a roundtable was created specifically for minorities in archival work.

The idea came out of the session "Minorities and the Profession: An Agenda for Action," (1981) chaired by Harold Pinkett, where Lachatanere was a panelist. After the session, archivists including Archie Motley, Thomas Battle, John Fleckner and Danny Williams, began to talk about next steps, including the drafting of a resolution to be presented to the SAA Business meeting. Members approved the resolution and the Task Force on Minorities was created. Thomas Battle was appointed as the chairman, with Diana Lachatanere invited as the SAA representative for the Joint Committee on Minority Recruitment. In 1984, she was elected to the Nominations Committee and was appointed to the Membership Committee.

Among the issues that the Task Force recommended was the creation of a membership committee. Lachatanere stated in the same interview, "the reason why we were pushing a membership committee is because then, out of the membership committee you could put together a recruitment program that could in fact target, we would target everybody, but we could specifically target black folks..."

In 1987 the task force ended with the recommendation that a minorities' roundtable be formed. Council approved the motion and the Archivists and Archives of Color Roundtable was established later that year, with Diana Lachatanere and Carol Rudisell serving as the initial coordinators for the roundtable. Diana served as co-editor and prepared the first two newsletters for the roundtable and helped to set an agenda for the group. The roundtable held its first meeting in September 1987 at the annual SAA conference in New York City. This meeting brought a structure for the roundtable that continues today, including the process of electing two co-chairs, with one being elected every year.

With SAA, Lachatanere has served a number of roles on committees and taskforces, including:

- Representative to the Joint Committee on Opportunities for Minorities in Museums, Archives and Historical Agencies, 1982
- Ex-officio member of the Task Force on Minorities, 1982–1984
- 1984 Nominating Committee
- 1986, 1991 Program Committees
- Manuscripts Repositories Section Steering Committee (1984 1988), Vice-chair (1986–1987), Chair (1987–1988)
- Chair, Nominations and Elections Committee (1989)
- Chair, Minorities Roundtable (1986–1987)
- SAA Membership Committee (1987–1989)

Within the Mid-Atlantic Regional Archives Conference, Lachatanere has also filled many roles:

- Fall 1986 Program Committee
- At-Large Representative (1987–89)
- MARAC Membership Committee (1987–88)
- Nominations and Elections Committee (1989)
- Arlene Custer Awards Committee (1991–93)

== Affiliations ==
- Advisory Committee, Afro-Latino Archives and Research Institute, 2006–2009
- Member, Board of Associates, The Afro-Latin@ Project, 2005–2007
- Consultant, African American Heritage Initiative Advisory Committee, Montclair Historical Society, 2005
- Consultant, Center for Black Music Research, Columbia College, 2004
- Astor Fellowship, New York Public Library, 2002–2003
- Member, Advisory Committee, Caribbean Collection Project, Brooklyn College, 2002- 2003
- Member, Documentation Advisory Council for the New York Heritage Documentation Project, New York's State Historical Records Advisory Board, 2000–2002
- Member, Collections Roundtable, National Underground Railroad Freedom Center, Cincinnati, Ohio, 2000
- Consultant, The Ford Foundation, Editing and Archives Meeting, 1998
- Member, New York's State Historical Records Advisory Board, 1996–1998
- Panelist, National Endowment for the Humanities, Division of Preservation and Access, February 1994
- Consultant, Jazz Heritage Project, Medgar Evers College, 1993
- Consultant, Cuban Archives Project, Cuban Research Institute, Florida International University, 1993
- Member, Research Task Force Committee, National African American Museum Project, 1992
- Member, African American Educational Archives Project Advisory Board, 1991–1997
- Consultant, Closer Cooperation Study Committee on the Archives of Payne Theological Seminary and Wilberforce University, 1991
- Consultant, Northside Center for Child Development, Inc., 1991
- Board Member, New York State Historical Records Advisory Council of New York Metropolitan Reference and Research Library Agency (METRO), 1989–1994
- Task Force on Collection Development and Documentation Strategies; Co-chair, Ethnic Succession and Changing Demography Task Force of the "Ordinary People, Extraordinary Lives" Project (co-sponsored with Robert F. Wagner Labor Archives, New York University and New York Metropolitan Reference and Research Library Agency, 1992–1993
- Puerto Rican Archives Survey Advisory Committee, Center for Puerto Rican Studies, Hunter College, City University of New York, 1989–1990
- Consultant, Institute for the Study of History, Life and Culture of Black People, Jackson State University, 1989
- Consultant, Walter Pach Papers. Archives of American Art, Smithsonian Institution, June 1988-June 1989
- Reviewer, National Endowment for the Humanities, (1980- ); National Historical Publications and Records Commission, (1990- )
- Guest Lecturer, Introduction to Archives Administration. Queens College, School of Library and Information Studies, 1981, 1982

== Publications ==
- "Ethnic Succession and Demographic Change," with Nelida Perez. In: Bernhardt, Debra and Rachel Bernstein, eds. Ordinary People, Extraordinary Lives: An Assessment of Archival Sources Documenting 20th Century New York City Social History, (NY: New York University, 1994.)
- Review, "The Black Experience: A Guide to Afro-American Resources in the Florida State Archives" in Provenance, Fall 1989
- "Researching Black Theatre at the Schomburg Center" and "Annotated Checklist of Plays." Black Theatre in Photographs catalog, (April 1983)
- Preliminary Listing of the San Francisco Manuscript Collections, California Historical Society (1980)
- Interview with Katherine Stewart Flippin: Schlesinger Library Black Women Oral History Project (1981)
- Naomi Anderson Johnson, San Francisco Public Library (1979)
- "Blacks in California: An Annotated Guide to the Manuscript Sources in the Library of the California Historical Society." California History (Fall, 1978)

=== Papers and presentations ===
- Panelist, Remaking the Past to Make the Future: "From Community Archives to International Research Center," Beyond Silence: Meaning and Memory in the Noise of Haiti's Present, Bard College, 2010
- Panelist, "Ethnic Archives: Collecting within Cultural Contexts," Society of American Archivists, 2008 Annual Meeting
- Paper, "The Source: Literary Research and Collections," Panel: Literary Research, Documentation and Archival Activity, Organization of Women Writers of Africa, 2004
- Paper, "African Libraries Documenting the Global Black Experience," Africana Libraries and Resources in the Information Age, Schomburg Center for Research in Black Culture, 2001
- Paper, "A National Perspective for African American Archives," Margaret Walker Alexander: A Twentieth Century Voice from the South, A National Symposium and Poetry Festival, 2000
- Panelist, "Race? Ethnicity? Diversity? What exactly are we talking about?" Society of American Archivists, 1996 Annual Meeting
- Panelist, "Policies on Research Access to Unprocessed Collections," Society of American Archivists, 1993 Annual Meeting
- Panelist, "Future African American Documentation Initiatives: Needs, Opportunities and Next Steps," Assessing the History and Future of African American Documentation Initiatives Conference co-sponsored by the State Historical Records Advisory Board of North Carolina and North Carolina Central University, 1993
- Paper, "How to Maintain a Local Church Archive," How Firm a Foundation: A Conference on Local Church History, African Methodist Episcopal Church, 1993
- Chair, "Documenting Contemporary Social Protest Movements," Society of American Archivists, 1989 Annual Meeting
- Panelist, "Black Archives in the Mid-Atlantic Region," Mid-Atlantic Regional Archives Con¬ference, Spring 1989 Meeting
- Chair, "Documenting Prominent Personalities: The Life of Paul Robeson," Society of American Archivists, 1987 Annual Meeting
- Panelist, "Building Your Clientele: Outreach Programs for New Audiences, "Mid-Atlantic Regional Archives Conference, Fall 1987
- Meeting Chair, "Documenting Minorities," Society of American Archivists, 1986 Annual Meeting
- Paper, "Manuscript Collections at the Schomburg Center for Research in Black Culture," The Afro-American History Society and the Afro-American Historical & Genealogical Society, 1986
- Panelist, "Available Resources and Needed Explorations: Panel of Curators of Ethnic American and Foreign Archives," American Society for Theatre Research, 1985
- Co leader, "Directing a Processing Staff," Roundtable, Society of American Archivists, 1983 Annual Meeting
- Panelist, "Career Planning for Archivists," Workshop, Society of American Archivists, 1982 Annual Meeting
- Panelist, "Developing Local Black Archives." A National Conference on Local Afro American History, sponsored by the National Afro American Museum and Cultural Center, 1982
- Chair, "Basic Exhibition Techniques," Mid Atlantic Regional Archives Conference, Fall 1981 Meeting
- Panelist, "Minorities and the Profession: An Agenda for Action." Society of American Archivists, 1981 Annual Meeting
- Paper, "The Schomburg Center". A National Conference on Black Museums Interpreting the Humanities, sponsored by the National Endowment for the Humanities in cooperation with the Bethune Historical Development Project, the National Council of Negro Women and the African American Museums Association, 1980
