= Charles E. Lee =

American archivist and historian

Charles Edward Lee
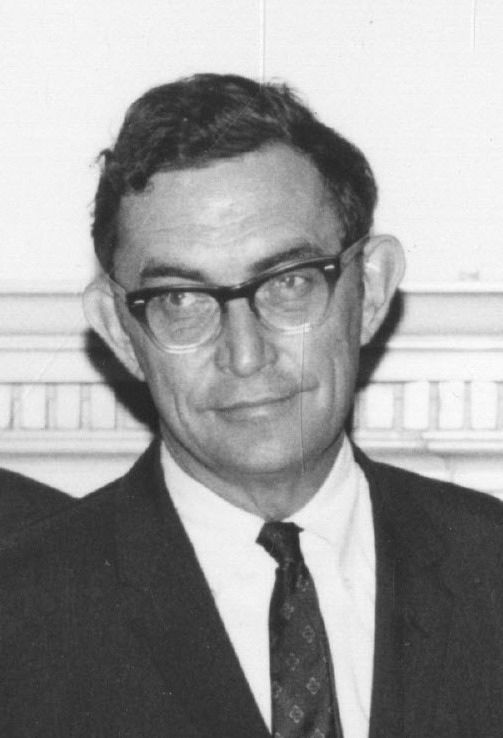
- Lee in 1969
- Born: Charles Edward Lee; June 17, 1917; Asheville, Buncombe County, North Carolina, U.S
- Died: May 30, 2008 (aged 90); Hartsville, Darlington County, South Carolina
- Education: University of South Carolina
- Occupations: Historian; archivist
- Employers: Society of American Archivists; University of South Carolina; University of South Carolina Press; South Carolina Department of Archives and History
- Spouse: Jane Blizzard Lee

Charles Edward Lee (1917–2008) was an American archivist and historian in South Carolina. He taught history at the University of South Carolina, and was director of the South Carolina Department of Archives and History between 1961 and 1987. During this time he was active in historic preservation work, and served as the 27th President of the Society of American Archivists.

Although he was born in North Carolina, Lee attended the University of South Carolina to earn his bachelor's and master's degree in history. He continued his studies at the University of Chicago before he returned to South Carolina to begin a career in teaching and editing. In 1961 he was appointed director of the South Carolina Archives Department (later the Department of Archives & History), with a supplemental appointment as state historic preservation officer in 1969. Lee oversaw a period of significant growth for the state archives, which expanded its role, facilities, and staff under his leadership.

Lee died in Hartsville, South Carolina on May 30, 2008.
