= Philip C. Brooks =

American archivist

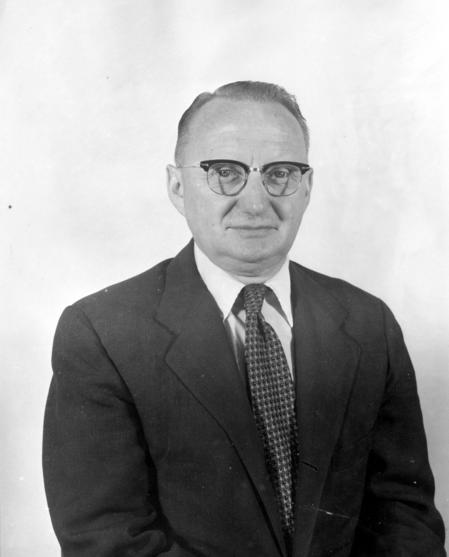
Portrait of Philip C. Brooks, 1958

Philip Coolidge Brooks (January 19, 1906 – July 24, 1977) was an archivist with the National Archives and Records Service, and directed the Harry S. Truman Library from 1957 to 1971.

Brooks was born in Washington, D.C. in 1906, the youngest son of Colorado Congressman Franklin E. Brooks. He completed his undergraduate studies at the University of Michigan, and later received a master's and doctoral degree from the University of California, Berkeley. In 1935 Brooks took a position with the National Archives, working first as a special examiner but quickly advancing within the agency. In 1957 he was appointed the first director of the Harry S. Truman Library, where he served for 14 years until his retirement.

Brooks was also a founder and contributor to the Society of American Archivists (SAA), and the author of books and articles on the archives profession. He was SAA's first secretary, was appointed with the support of the National Archives, and served from 1936 to 1942. He later served as the Society's seventh president from 1949 to 1951.
