= Leon deValinger Jr. =

American archivist and historian

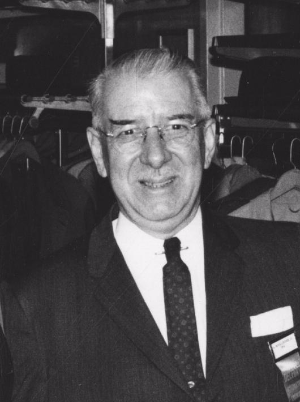
- Close-up of Leon deValinger Jr., taken in 1966 at the Extraordinary Congress of the International Council on Archives.
- Born: Leon deValinger Jr. June 25, 1905; Middletown, Delaware
- Died: July 5, 2000 (aged 95); Dover, Delaware
- Occupation: State Archivist of Delaware

Leon deValinger Jr. (June 25, 1905 – July 5, 2000) was an American archivist and historian, and served as the state archivist of Delaware from 1941 to 1970.

Leon deValinger Jr. was born in Middletown, Delaware, and studied history and political science at the University of Delaware. He received his undergraduate degree in 1930, and a master's degree in 1935 with a thesis on the early development of local government in Delaware. After completing his bachelor's degree, deValinger was hired to work as an assistant at the Delaware state archives and worked under archivists Henry Clay Conrad and George Ryden.

Following Ryden's death, in October 1941 deValinger was appointed the first full-time state archivist. He served as state archivist from 1941 to 1970, when he was reassigned as state historian. During his tenure he worked to advance archival services and programs, and was an early adopter of technologies such as microfilm and lamination. DeValinger resigned shortly after his appointment as historian, and worked briefly for the League of Local Government before his retirement.

DeValinger was an active contributor to the archival profession, and served in the Society of American Archivists as a council member (1954–1957), treasurer (1957–1961), and president (1962–1963).
