= Wilfred I. Smith =

Dominion Archivist of Canada
- In office 1970–1984
- Preceded by: William Kaye Lamb
- Succeeded by: Jean-Pierre Wallot

Personal details
- Born: May 20, 1919 Port La Tour, Nova Scotia, Canada
- Died: July 28, 1998 (aged 79)
- Spouse: Joanne Eileen Capstick
- Children: Gordon Heather Gail

Wilfred I. "Wilf" Smith (May 20, 1919 – July 28, 1998) was a Canadian public servant and Dominion Archivist from 1970 to 1984.

Born in Port La Tour, Nova Scotia, Smith received a Bachelor of Arts degree in 1943 and a Master of Arts degree in 1946 from Acadia University. He received a Ph.D. from the University of Minnesota.

Smith joined the Public Archives of Canada in Ottawa in 1950. He was chief of the Manuscript Division (1963–1964), director of the Historical Branch (1964–1965), Assistant Dominion Archivist (1965–1968) and Acting Dominion Archivist (1968–1970). From 1970 to 1984, he was Dominion Archivist.

He was President of the Society of American Archivists from 1972 to 1973.

== Honours ==
In 1985, he was made an Officer of the Order of Canada in recognition for having "developed the Public Archives of Canada into a world-class institution".
