= Hedlin =

Hedlin is a surname. Notable people with the surname include:

- Edie Hedlin (born 1944), American archivist, librarian, and historian
- Eric Hedlin (born 1993), Canadian long-distance swimmer
