= Brenda Banks =

American archivist (born 1949)

- Born: November 11, 1949; Atlanta, Georgia
- Died: July 25, 2016 (aged 66); Thomaston, Georgia
- Education: Spelman College; Atlanta University
- Occupation: Archivist
- Years active: 1972–2016
- Employer(s): Georgia Archives, Banks Archives Consultants

Brenda S. Banks (November 11, 1949 – July 25, 2016) was an American archivist known for her work in preserving the history of Georgia as board chair for the Georgia Archives Institute. Her work with the Georgia Archives and her innovations in education and training programs made her a leading figure in American intellectual life.

== Career ==
=== Georgia State Archives ===
Banks was a fixture in the Archival, Curatorial and Library Sciences field in Georgia for nearly 40 years, and dedicated herself to identifying, selecting, preserving, and making accessible the records that constitute the state's recorded history. Her career began shortly after earning a master's degree in Library Science from Atlanta University in 1972, when she joined the Georgia Department of Archives and History as Assistant Archivist. She was the only African-American professional on staff at that time. Banks rose through the ranks, ultimately becoming deputy director of the Georgia Archives. In her role as deputy director, she was responsible for administering the archives program and served as project manager for the construction of a new 172,000 square foot state of the art archives facility. In her final years before her retirement in 2005, she was elected to serve as the board chair for the Georgia Archives Institute.

=== African-American history ===
After her work for the state of Georgia, she dedicated herself to several historical significant projects. She was managing archivist for the Morehouse College, Atlanta, GA, Martin Luther King, Jr. Collection, and served the Audre Lorde Collection at Spelman College as the senior project archivist.

=== Banks Archives Consultants ===
Banks was the president and CEO of Banks Archives Consultants, and part of the SGA Fellow class of 2009. She held positions as project manager for SOLINET's (Solutions for Innovative Networks, since merged to create new company) Gulf Coast Academic Library Recovery Project, and assisting various architecture firms and cultural institutions with archival design.

=== Professional associations ===
Banks was active in numerous standards bodies related to archival, curatorial and library sciences. She was the president of the Society of American Archivists for the 1995–1996 term. Banks has served as president of the Society of Georgia Archivists, served on the Board of the National Association of Government Archives and Records Administrators, and the International Council on Archives. Banks was also appointed as a transition team leader for the Clinton Administration to conduct a management review of the National Archives and Records Administration.

=== Distinguished positions ===
SAA President, 1995-1996

SGA President, 1988-1989

Chair, SAA Diversity Task Force

Co-Founder, SAA Archives & Archivists of Color Roundtable

Fellow, SAA

Fellow, SGA

Co-Founder, Georgia Archives Institute

Deputy Director, Georgia Archives

President and CEO, Banks Archives Consultants

== Awards and commendations ==
She received several awards throughout her career, including: Fellow of the Society of American Archivists, Governor's Award in the Humanities, Archives Advocacy Award (Georgia Historical Records Advisory Board), Individual Achievement Award in Archives and Records Management at the Georgia Records Association, Society of American Archivists Council Exemplary Award, Fellow of the Society of Georgia Archivists, Distinguished Alumnae Award at the National Association for Equal Education Opportunity, Alumnae Achievement Award at Spelman College, Beta Phi Mu, and she was highlighted in the magazines Black Enterprise and Ebony.
