= Gregor Trinkaus-Randall =

American archivist and preservationist (1946–2019)

- Born: January 10, 1946
- Died: August 16, 2019 (aged 73); Lincoln, Massachusetts
- Education: University of Wisconsin–Madison; Deerfield Academy
- Occupations: archivist; preservation specialist
- Years active: 38
- Employers: Society of American Archivists; Massachusetts Board of Library Commissioners; Peabody Museum of Salem; Computer History Museum; USS Constitution Museum
- Spouse: Vickery Trinkaus-Randall
- Children: 2

Gregor Trinkaus-Randall (1946-2019) was an American archivist and preservationist who served as the 67th President of the Society of American Archivists (SAA). He was also known as a leader in the library and archives preservation community in Massachusetts.

== Life ==
Trinkaus-Randall was born in Boston, Massachusetts, in 1946 and attended Deerfield Academy. He then studied at the University of Wisconsin–Madison (UWM), receiving a bachelor's degree in history and French in 1968, and a master's degree in African history in 1973. After graduation he taught high school courses at Virginia Academy and the Beaver Country Day School before returning to UWM to pursue an MALS degree in library science and archival administration under F. Gerald Ham.

After completing his degree, Trinkaus-Randall began his career as an archivist at the USS Constitution Museum and the Computer Museum before moving to the Peabody Museum of Salem. In 1988 he became the preservation specialist for the Massachusetts Board of Library Commissioners, where he remained until his retirement, in 2018. In this position he coordinated emergency response planning for cultural heritage institutions throughout the state, as well as other preservation activities.

Trinkaus-Randall was also involved in professional associations related to archival work, including the New England Archivists (NEA) and the Society of American Archivists. He served as president of the New England Archivists in 1995 and 1996, and was president of the Society of American Archivists in 2011 and 2012. In 2017 he was elected president of the Academy of Certified Archivists (ACA); he later resigned because of illness. He was also the recipient of the NEA Distinguished Service Award and the ACA Distinguished Service Award. He was elected an SAA Fellow in 2006.

== Death ==
Trinkaus-Randall died on August 16, 2019.

== Works ==
- Protecting Your Collections: A Manual of Archival Security (Chicago: Society of American Archivists, 1995)
- "The Good, the Bad, and the Ugly: The Archival Profession and Future Challenges," American Archivist 76, no. 1 (Spring/Summer 2013): 10–18
- "The USA PATRIOT Act: Archival Implications," Journal of Archival Organization 3, no. 4 (2006): 7–23
- "Library and Archival Security: Policies and Procedures to Protect Holdings from Theft and Damage," Journal of Library Administration 25, no. 1 (1998): 91–112
