= Sue E. Holbert =

Archivist

- Born: 1935 (age 90–91)
- Occupation: American archivist
- Years active: 1972-1993
- Known for: Minnesota Historical Society archivist, Minnesota State Archivist

Sue E. Holbert (born 1935) was an American archivist with the Minnesota Historical Society and the Minnesota State Archivist (1979–1993). She is now the owner of Booklady Used and Rare Books in Chicago, Illinois.

== Career ==
After working in the Minnesota Historical Society's publications division, in 1972 she became an archivist there. In 1979, she became the Minnesota State Archivist. Professionally, she was also a member of the Society of American Archivists (SAA) council (1981–1985), chair of SAA's Government Records Section (1980–1981), and SAA President (1987–1988). In 1983, she was elected as a fellow of SAA. Holbert also served as deputy coordinator of the Minnesota State Historical Records Advisory Board from 1978 to 1988 and also headed the State Coordinators' Steering Committee (1985–1986).

== Publications ==
In 1977, she wrote Archives & Manuscripts: Reference & Access, part of the SAA basic manual series. She also wrote the chapter Women in the Minnesota Legislature in Women of Minnesota: Selected Biographical Essays.
