= Clifford K. Shipton =

American archivist and historian

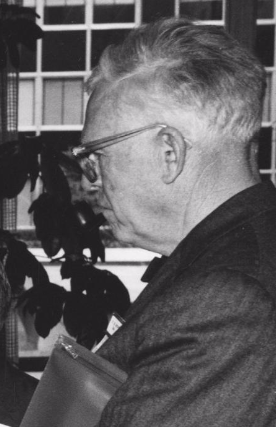
- 1966
- Born: Clifford Kenyon Shipton; August 5, 1902; Pittsfield, Massachusetts
- Died: December 3, 1973 (aged 71); Ayer, Massachusetts
- Occupations: archivist; historian
- Spouse: Dorothy Boyd MacKillop Shipton

Clifford Kenyon Shipton (August 5, 1902 – December 3, 1973) was an American archivist and historian. He served as university archivist at Harvard University and director of the American Antiquarian Society.

Shipton was born in Pittsfield, Massachusetts, and first came to Harvard in 1922. He received an undergraduate degree from the university in 1926, and later completed master's and doctoral studies. In 1930 he began work as editor of the Sibley's Harvard Graduates; between 1932 and 1975 he completed work on the Harvard classes of 1690 to 1771. In 1938 was appointed Harvard University Archivist. He was also director of the American Antiquarian Society from 1959 to 1967.

Shipton was a founding member of the Society of American Archivists and was its president in 1967 and 1968.
