= Jackie M. Dooley =

American archivist

Jackie M. Dooley is an American archivist who has served with the Library of Congress, UC San Diego, the Getty, OCLC Research, and as council member, vice president, and president of the Society of American Archivists. She has published several notable works that have been extraordinarily useful in the archival profession in the United States and in the United Kingdom. She has been most influential in her work to utilize the internet and blogs in her archival work, reaching hundreds of thousands of people working in archives or simply interested in the field. She has helped promote several institutions online including the Society of American Archivists and the Library of Congress.

== Career ==
Over her decades-long career, Dooley has great experience in special collections, including rare books, archives, manuscripts and visual materials. At the University of California, Irvine, Jackie Dooley was Head of Special Collections and Archives. Dooley is currently the Head of Collections for Cataloging at the Getty Center for the History of Art and the Humanities in Santa Monica, California. From 1992–1994 Dooley served as the vice-chair/chair-elect for the Association of College and Research Libraries' Rare Books and Manuscripts Division. She retired from her position as Program Officer at OCLC Research in 2018.

She writes on archives and the archival profession through many outlets, including the OCLC Research blog as well as the SAA. As president of the SAA, she has been applauded for seeking broad input and acting creatively in the work of the Annual Meeting Task Force and on the SAA's strategic planning process. She also started the "Off the Record" blog as an important communication of the SAA and has enthusiastically promoted the SAA on Twitter.

She has been an active member of the Society of American Archivists throughout her career. She has served in various positions throughout her membership, including Council Member, Vice President, and President from 2012 to 2013. She has also written several pieces for the organization's journal, The American Archivist, and has edited issues in the past.

Dooley has also remained active in both the Rare Books and Manuscripts Section of the Association of College & Research Libraries and the Working Group on Special Collections of the Association of Research Libraries.

== Selected works ==
- Encoded Archival Description: Context, Theory, and Case Studies (1997)
- Taking Our Pulse : the OCLC Research Survey of Special Collections and Archives (2010)
- Descriptive Metadata for Web Archiving: Recommendations of the OCLC Research Library Partnership Web Archiving Metadata Working Group (2018)
- The Archival Advantage: Integrating Archival Expertise Into Management of Born-Digital Library Materials (2015)
- Survey of Special Collections and Archives in the United Kingdom and Ireland: Summary and Recommendations (2013)
