= Helen Wong Smith =

American archivist and librarian

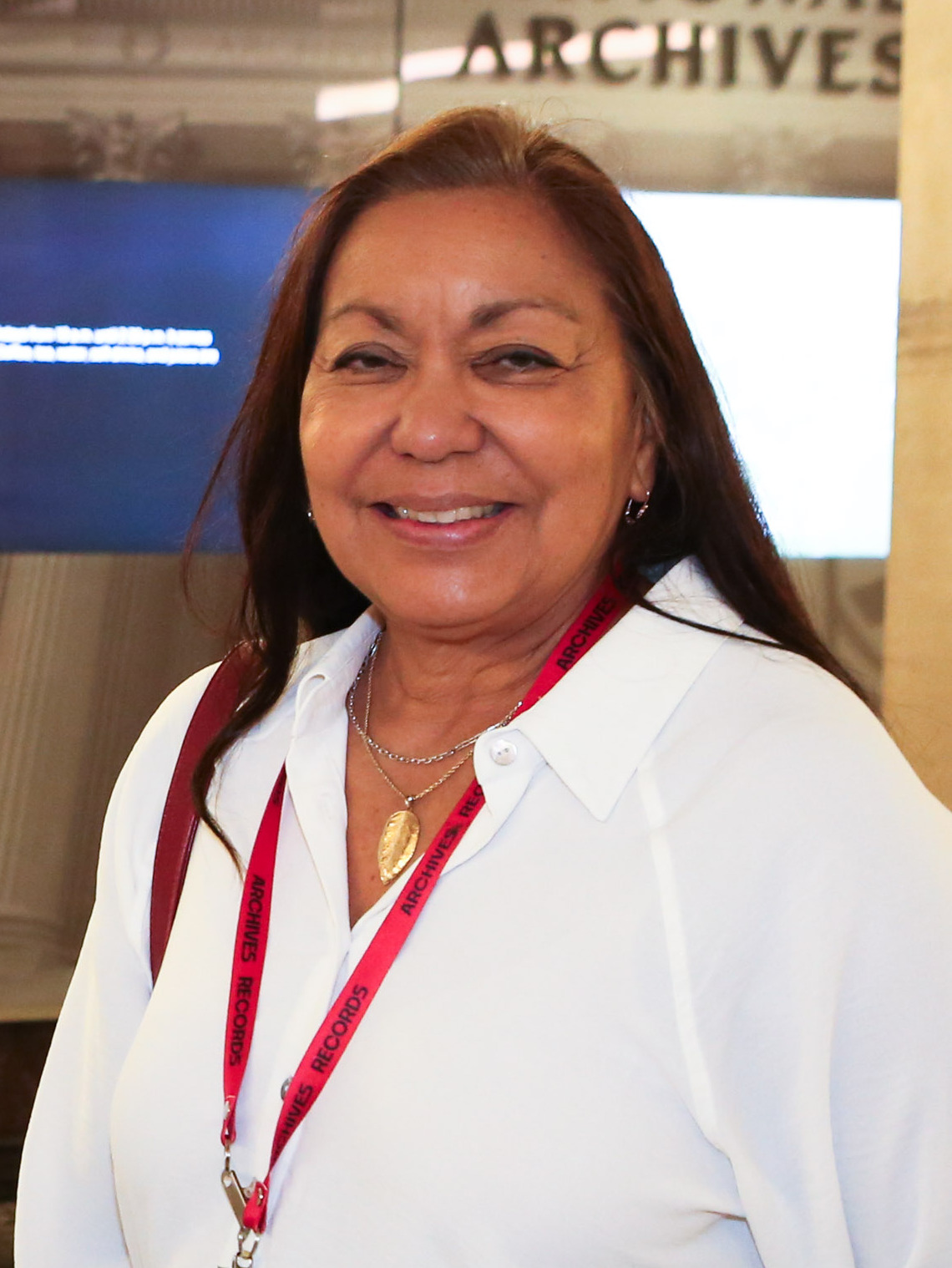
Helen Wong Smith in July 2023 at the Society of American Archivists and Council of State Archivists Joint Annual Meeting Open House at the National Archives in Washington, D.C.

Helen Wong Smith is an American archivist and librarian. She is the archivist and librarian for University Records at the University of Hawaiʻi at Mānoa. She works in the University Archives and Manuscripts Collection of the Public Services Division. She is formerly an Archivist and Librarian for the State Historic Preservation Division as well as the executive director of the Kauaʻi Historical Society. Smith is an active member of the Society of American Archivists, becoming president in 2023, and having served in many leadership roles including on the council, the Committee on Education, and the Nominating Committee from 2012 to 2014. Smith was named an SAA Fellow on June 10, 2016.

== Early life and education ==
Smith's hometown is Heʻeia on the island of Oʻahu. Her heritage is Chinese and Portuguese.

She attended the University of Hawaiʻi for a bachelor's degree in Hawaiian Studies as well as her Master's in Library Science.

== Career ==
Smith has worked in several archive or library positions across Hawaiʻi, including the Hawaiian Collection Librarian at the University of Hawaiʻi at Hilo and lead archivist for the Pacific Island Network of the National Park Service. In 2000, she became a Certified Archivist and served on their Nominating Committee. She has been elected twice as the president of the Association of Hawaiʻi Archivists, as well as serving as president of the Hawaiian Library Association and the Hawaiian Historical Society.

She has served as ambassador of Hawaiian and Pacific archives and worked to bring forward unknown or forgotten collections in her research and presentations. She has researched and written on Hawaiian cultural resources as well as presenting her discoveries through lectures and workshops for over 35 years.

Smith is also a strong advocate for cultural competency among archivists and allied professions. In 2015, she addressed the SAA at their Annual Meeting with her "Adopting Cultural Diversity Competence" presentation, which is now a workshop that is offered by the SAA. In the description of the course, Smith explains Cultural Diversity Competency (CDC) is "the ability to function with awareness, knowledge, and interpersonal skill when engaging people of different backgrounds, assumptions, beliefs, values, and behaviors." Among the desired outcomes, the course should bring students to critically examine their interactions with people of other cultures, create methods to improve those interactions, and "combine cultural-mindedness with culturally centered communication skills for effective relationships with all people forming the basis for culturally competent organizations, communities and societies."

In an interview with Joyce Gabiola, Smith explained that she was surprised to be nominated for the SAA Fellows Award. When she first joined the SAA, she

felt very isolated. Not un-welcomed, but definitely not embraced. When seeing who was on Council and the leadership, I believed the only place would be AACR. There wasn't a clear opportunity for me back then, so I was shocked when I became a Fellow. I haven't written books, so being elected is an example of inclusion and diversity. From the middle of the Pacific my contribution has been limited and it's most likely the introduction and training in cultural competency that has led SAA to recognize me.

Smith has advocated for diversity among archivists and archives. In the same interview, she states that "our job as archivists is to show what we have, but also what isn't there—what this collection lacks. This is why it's important for professionalization."

== Publications ==
- "Expanding the Reach of the Cosmic Dancer: Inter-campus Collaboration Provides Access to the works of the Rev. Dr. Mitsuo Aoki" Archival Outlook, Society of American Archivists, July/August 2022.
- Relevant, Respectful, and Responsive: Government Archives in the 21st Century – An Overview of Cultural Competency in State and Territorial Archives in 2022, Michelle Gallinger, Helen Wong Smith, Anne W. Ackerson, State Electronic Records Initiative, Council of State Archivists, March 2022.
- "Review of Leading and Managing Archives and Manuscripts Programs," American Archivist, 83-1 (Spring/Summer 2020).
- "Introduction," Diversity, Inclusion, and Cultural Competency Special Issue, Journal of Western Archives: 2019 Volume 10: Issue 1, Article 1.
- "Assessing Power Dynamics in Multigenerational Archives" Archival Outlook, Society of American Archivists, January/February 2021.
- "Transition from Traditional to Western Medicine in Hawaiʻi (Part 2) Western Legislative Impacts on Traditional Medical Practices" Hawaiʻi Journal of Medicine & Public Health, May 2016, Volume 75, Number 5
- "Transition from Traditional to Western Medicine in Hawaiʻi (Part 1)" Hawaiʻi Journal of Medicine & Public Health, March 2016, Volume 75, Number 3.
- Significance of HbA1c and its measurement in the diagnosis of diabetes mellitus: US experience, Juarez DT, Demaris KM, Goo R, Mnatzaganian CL, Wong Smith H, Diabetes, Metabolic Syndrome and Obesity: Targets and Therapy October 2014 Volume 2014:7 Pages 487–494.
- "Transition from Tradition to Western Medicine in Hawaiʻi (Part 2): Western Legislative Impacts on Traditional Medicine Practices." Hawaiʻi Journal of Medicine & Public Health 75, number 5 (2016): pages 148–150.
- "Transition from Traditional to Western Medicine in Hawaiʻi (Part 1)." Hawaiʻi Journal of Medicine & Public Health 75, no. 3 (2016): pages 87–89.
- Kerri A. Inglis and Helen Wong Smith. "University of Hawaiʻi, Hilo: Hawaiʻi at Hilo & the Christensen Photographic Collection: Preserving a Piece of Hamākua's History." Past or Portal? Enhancing Undergraduate Education through Special Collections and Archives. Edited by Eleanor Mitchell, Peggy Seiden and Suzy Taraba. Chicago: Association of college and Research Libraries, 2012.
- A Brief History of the Ahupuaʻa of Puʻuwaʻawaʻa and its Neighbors in North Kona, Island of Hawaiʻi.

Collaboration with Marion Kelly, for Earl Bakken, Kīholo, Hawaiʻi, 1996.

== Awards ==
- President's Award for Excellence, Council of State Archivists, 2022
- Awardee, Lei Lau Kukui Award, Society of American Archivists Student Chapter, Hawaiʻi, 2018
- Awardee, Archives Leadership Institute, Berea College, Kentucky, 2016
- Fellow, Society of American Archivists, 2016
- Agnes C. Conrad Award, Association of Hawai'i Archivists, 2009
- Awardee, Mary Edward Professional Award - Library Alumnus, 1990
- Awardee, Beta Phi Mu (Library Honor Society) Chapter XI, 1986
