= Clifford Muse =

American historian and archivist

Clifford L. Muse, Jr. (born April 27, 1944, in Highstown, New Jersey) is an African American historian and archivist. He is currently Howard University's archivist and associate director at the Moorland–Spingarn Research Center. He is most well known for his involvement in the diversity issues of the archive profession as well as his research and writings on Dr. Martin Luther King, Jr. and Frederick Douglass.

== Career ==
Dr. Muse was born in Highstown, New Jersey, where he also attended high school. He graduated from Hartwick College in Oneonta, New York, and Howard University.

He worked as an archivist in the Office of the Presidential Libraries in the National Archives and Records Service (NARS) and was the senior archivist on the Richard Nixon Presidential Materials Project.

In 1981, Muse began working at Howard University. He has remained an adjunct faculty member at Howard, as well as The Catholic University of America, for over 30 years. He teaches courses on American history, archives and information management. He specializes in studying black history around the world and has contributed heavily to Moorland-Spingarn's impressive collection.

== Affiliations ==
He is a member of many organizations, including the American Historical Association (AHA), Mid-Atlantic Regional Archives Conference (MARAC), Association of Records Managers and Administrators (ARMA), and the Association for the Study of Afro-American Life and History (ASALH).

He is also a career-long member of the Society of American Archivists and was influential in creating diversity committees, task forces, and even in the roundtable. Along with 8 other SAA members, Muse helped to form the Archivists and Archives of Color Roundtable in 1987.

He has written numerous articles and book reviews in many publications. He is most well known for his articles on Frederick Douglass and Martin Luther King, Jr. He has also written heavily on the history of Howard University and his articles, "Howard University and U.S. Foreign Affairs During the Franklin D. Roosevelt Administration, 1933-1945" and "Howard University and the Federal Government During the Presidential Administrations of Herbert Hoover and Franklin D. Roosevelt, 1928-1945" are heavily cited by historians and academics.

In 1995, he co-authored Howard in Retrospect: Images of the Capstone, a history of Howard University, with Thomas Battle.
