= Dolores Renze =

American archivist (1907–2002)

- Born: Dolores C. Renze; July 11, 1907; Denver, Colorado, U.S
- Died: December 4, 2002 (aged 95)
- Education: University of Denver; American University
- Occupations: administrator; archivist
- Employers: Society of American Archivists; Colorado State Archives
- Spouse: Walter Renze
- Children: 2

Dolores C. Renze (July 11, 1907 – December 4, 2002) was an American archivist and administrator who served as the 21st President of the Society of American Archivists. She was also an editor of The American Archivist.

== Life ==
Born in 1907 in Denver, Colorado, U.S., to father Thomas E. Calahan and mother Anna Phennah. She later married Walter Renze and had two children, James and Beverly.

Renze was educated at the University of Denver and American University where she obtained her Bachelor's, Master's and Doctoral degrees. She also held Certificates of Completion in Archives, Records Administration and Management, Oral History, Micrographics, and Public Administration.

In 1949, Renze succeeded Herbert O. Brayer to become the first woman to be appointed State Archivist of the Colorado State Archives until in 1973 when she retired.

Starting in 1950, she also led one of the earliest American programs for training archivists, jointly offered by the University of Denver and the Colorado State Archives. Upon retirement, she continued to play an active part in archival education at the University of Denver by partnering with Enid Thompson as adjunct professors in archival management and history until in 1985, following the termination of the program.

In 1965, she was elected president of the Society of American Archivists after she had previously served as vice-president and secretary. She has written and lectured on several archival subject matters.

In addition to her archival experience, she also served as an administrative assistant to a Wyoming Senator, an archaeologist in the Southwest, and a law enforcer for the Labor and Agriculture Departments. She served in many volunteer organizations and directed or participated in many boards.

Her archival collection, the Dolores C. Renze Papers, are held at the University of Denver Archives. The collection consists of Colorado State Archives materials, archive projects, University of Denver materials, lists and notes, and repository guides that were created and used during her career. The collection also includes correspondence, publications such as newspaper clippings, and inventories.

=== Affiliations ===
- Member of Zeta Tau Alpha sorority
- Member of Phi Beta Kappa
- Member of Mensa Society
- Member of American Association of University Women
- Member, Fellow, Secretary, Vice President (1964–1965) and President (1965–1966) of Society of American Archivists

== Death ==
Renze died on December 4, 2002.
