= William L. Joyce =

American archivist (1942–2021)

- Born: William Leonard Joyce; March 29, 1942; Rockville Centre, New York
- Died: June 6, 2021 (aged 79); Princeton Junction, New Jersey
- Education: Providence College; St. John's University (New York City); University of Michigan
- Occupation: archivist
- Employers: University of Michigan; American Antiquarian Society; New York Public Library; Princeton University; Pennsylvania State University

William L. Joyce (March 29, 1942 – June 6, 2021) was an American archivist, librarian, and academic administrator. He served as the 42nd president of the Society of American Archivists.

== Career ==
Joyce was raised in Freeport, New York, and completed his undergraduate education at Providence College. He continued his studies at St. John's University, earning a master's degree in 1966, and earned a Ph.D. in history from the University of Michigan in 1974. For his dissertation he focused on the history of the 19th-century Irish-American press.

Upon entering the field of librarianship and archives, Joyce worked at the William L. Clements Library at the University of Michigan from 1968 to 1972. In the years to come he would work for the American Antiquarian Society (1972–1981), the New York Public Library (1981–1986), Princeton University (1986–2000), and Pennsylvania State University (2000–2010). This included service as a curator, education officer, and library administrator. Over the course of his career, Joyce also wrote on American publishing history and librarianship.

Joyce was an active member of the library and archives community, serving in the Society of American Archivists (SAA), the Rare Books and Manuscripts Section of the Association of College and Research Libraries, the Grolier Club, and the American Historical Association. Within SAA he served as a member of Council, and was elected the organization's president for 1986 to 1987. He also served prominent roles in the Task Force on Institutional Evaluation and the Committee on Archival Information Exchange. He was elected a Fellow of the Society in 1982. In addition to his service in professional organizations, Joyce was a member of the John F. Kennedy Assassination Records Review Board from 1993 until the release of the committee's report in 1998.

Joyce retired from Pennsylvania State University in 2010, and died on June 6, 2021, in Princeton Junction, New Jersey.
