= H. G. Jones =

American archivist and administrator (1924–2018)

- Born: Houston Gwynne Jones; January 7, 1924; Caswell County, North Carolina, U.S
- Died: October 14, 2018 (aged 94); Pittsboro, North Carolina
- Education: Appalachian State Teachers College; George Peabody College; Duke University
- Occupations: administrator; archivist
- Employers: Society of American Archivists; State Archives of North Carolina; University of North Carolina at Chapel Hill

Houston Gwynne Jones (1924–2018) was an American archivist and administrator in North Carolina. He served as director of the State Archives of North Carolina, and then as a curator and historian at the University of North Carolina at Chapel Hill. Jones was also active in the archives and history professions, serving as the 24th President of the Society of American Archivists.

During World War II, Jones served as a sonar operator in the United States Navy. After the war, he completed his undergraduate degree at Appalachian State University before getting his M.A. from George Peabody College and his Ph.D. from Duke University.

Jones was born on January 7, 1924, in Caswell County, North Carolina, and died on October 14, 2018, in Pittsboro, North Carolina.
