= Ruth W. Helmuth =

American archivist

- Born: Ruth Walter; August 29, 1918; Cleveland, Ohio, U.S
- Died: July 16, 1997 (aged 78)
- Education: Radcliffe College; Smith College
- Occupations: administrator; archivist
- Employers: Society of American Archivists; Case Western Reserve University
- Spouse: Donovan Edward Helmuth
- Children: 1

Ruth Irma Walter Helmuth (1918–1997) was an American archivist who served as the 36th President of the Society of American Archivists. She was also a leader in the archives community in Ohio, and was a founding member of the Society of Ohio Archivists.

== Life ==
Born in 1918 in Cleveland, Ohio, U.S., Helmuth was educated at the Radcliffe College and Smith College where she obtained her Bachelor's and master's degrees. After graduation she taught high school English classes and worked in office management before entering the archives profession.

In 1967 Helmuth was appointed university archivist for Case Western Reserve University, continuing in this position until her retirement in 1985. During her time at the university, she helped sponsor summer workshop programs for training archivists, and worked to establish a formal archives training program in association with the School of Library Science and the Department of History.

Helmuth was also involved with regional and national archival associations. From 1973 to 1977, Helmuth served on the SAA Council while she was serving at Case Western Reserve University. In 1979, she was elected vice president and in 1981 she became the president of the Society of American Archivists. During her career she also worked on a range of professional committees related to archival training and professional standards.

== Death ==
Helmuth died on July 16, 1997.
