= Midwest Archives Conference =

Regional archivist association

The Midwest Archives Conference (MAC) is a regional archivist association serving the Midwestern region of the United States. MAC was founded in 1972 and held its first fall meeting in the Bismarck Hotel in Chicago, Illinois. While MAC has over 800 members from various states and countries, the MAC region is composed of Illinois, Indiana, Iowa, Kansas, Kentucky, Michigan, Minnesota, Missouri, Nebraska, North Dakota, South Dakota, Ohio, and Wisconsin. MAC holds annual conferences with roundtables, panels, and workshops targeted towards archivists, curators, and librarians. Conferences have addressed such topics as federal funding for archives, documenting social history through the records of various ethnic groups, conservation, and data reporting standards for archival institutions. Other presentations have discussed how an archives can tie into their parent institution's anniversaries and big events, or how to make popular music collections a part of your archives. Annual meetings include informational sessions and notable plenary speakers, such as Pulitzer Prize winning author Leon Dash, who spoke at the 2006 Annual Meeting in Bloomington, Illinois. Annual conferences also often include themes, such as "Documenting Rural America" (the theme of the 1986 conference held in Hudson, Wisconsin.

== History ==
The Midwest Archives Conference officially began in May 1972 with 111 members although the idea of a regional conference had been discussed as early as the 1971 Society of American Archivists meeting in San Francisco. At a second meeting on September 29–30 MAC adopted a constitution, amendments, and elected officers and Council members. The MAC Newsletter began quarterly publication in January 1973. Due to the efforts of Mary Lynn Ritzenthaler and others MAC began publishing its scholarly journal, The Midwestern Archivist (later Archival Issues), in 1976 . An early review of The Midwestern Archivist by Trudy Huskamp Peterson notes that the first two issues included only articles and book reviews, with plans to include additional material in later issues.

== Publications ==
MAC offers the following publications:

- The Midwestern Archivist (1976–1991)
- Archival Issues (1992–current)
- MAC Newsletter (1973–current)

== MAC presidents ==
- 1972–1975: Archie Motley
- 1975–1977: Jacqueline Haring
- 1977–1979: Mary Ann Bamberger
- 1979-1981: Nicholas Burckel
- 1981–1983: Patrick Quinn
- 1983–1985: James Fogerty
- 1985–1987: Mary Janzen
- 1987–1989: William Maher
- 1989–1991: Nancy Lankford
- 1991–1993: Valerie Gerrard Browne
- 1993–1995: J. Frank Cook
- 1995–1997: Mark Greene
- 1997–1999: Pat Michaelis
- 1999–2001: Frank Boles
- 2001–2003: Cheri Thies
- 2003–2005: Steve McShane
- 2005–2007: Elisabeth Wittman
- 2007–2009: Dennis Meissner
- 2009–2011: Tanya Zanish-Belcher
- 2011-2013: Ellen Swain
- 2013–2015: Amy Cooper Cary
- 2015–2017: Jennifer Johnson
- 2017–2019: David McCartney
- 2019–2021: Erik Moore
- 2021-2023: Tamar Chute
- 2023-2025: Jennie Thomas
