= Herbert E. Angel =

American Archivist (1907–1999)

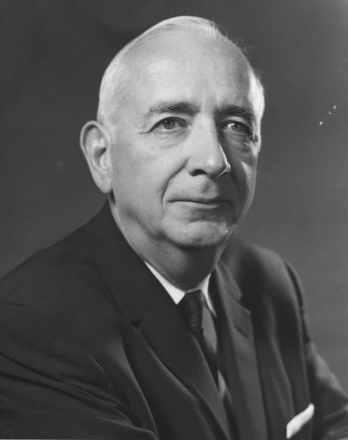
- Born: April 12, 1907; Virginia, US
- Died: January 16, 1999 (aged 91); Fort Worth, Texas, US
- Occupation: Deputy Archivist of the United States

Herbert Edmund Angel (April 12, 1907 – January 16, 1999) was an American archivist, and served as Deputy Archivist of the United States.

Angel began his service as a federal employee in 1932, and joined the National Archives after it was established in 1936. Over the course of a career spanning more than three decades, Angel advanced to the position of Deputy Archivist of the United States. Following his retirement in the late 1960s, Angel also played a prominent role in the development of the records grant program of the National Historic Publications Commission. During his service he was active in the archives community, and served as president of the Society of American Archivists from 1966 to 1967.

Angel died on January 16, 1999, in Fort Worth, Texas.
