= Academy of Certified Archivists =

The Academy of Certified Archivists is an American independent, nonprofit organization of professional archivists founded in 1989.

== History ==
The professional qualifications of archivists became an issue in the 1950s, when the Society of American Archivists (SAA) and the American Historical Association made the case that the archivist of the United States should be a professional, not political, appointee. The 1970s saw much internal SAA discussion of education and professional development, but few colleges and universities were interested in program accreditation. By the mid-1980s, it became clear that individual certification was the viable option. In 1987, SAA established an Interim Board for Certification (IBC) to set standards for professional certification and the exam to be administered. It also evaluated practicing archivists' petitions for certification. In 1989, one hundred such petitions were approved and the Academy of Certified Archivists (ACA) was created.

As of July 2016, 231 applicants had registered for the examination and there were over 1,100 Certified Archivists.

== Membership requirements ==
Archivists seeking certification must meet eligibility requirements regarding their education and experience. That certification may be maintained by various professional development activities, including workshop attendance, and professional service.

== Examination ==
The ACA exam, offered annually at various locations, is a multiple choice test that covers seven domains of knowledge:

- Selection, appraisal, and acquisition
- Arrangement and description
- Reference service and access
- Preservation and protection
- Outreach, advocacy, and promotion
- Managing archival programs
- Professional, ethical, and legal responsibilities

== Debate over certification ==
The benefits of certification have been a subject of debate within the profession and in its literature. When SAA polled its members in 1985, over 70% supported the ACA's creation. In a 2013 survey, Susan Hamburger found that "archival certification has a lukewarm to hostile response from hiring managers." Only 3% of employers required certification, and 30% preferred it. Eira Tansey's analysis of listserv job postings between October 2006 and May 2014 revealed a distinct regional split: "Few jobs indicate a hiring preference for ACA archival certification, however those that do tend to be in the South and Midwest." Mott Lin argues that certification places archives firmly in line with other professions, and that "archivists of today are fortunate" for the practice in light of the failure to implement accreditation of individual archives or educational programs.
