= Meredith Evans (archivist) =

Archivist and historian

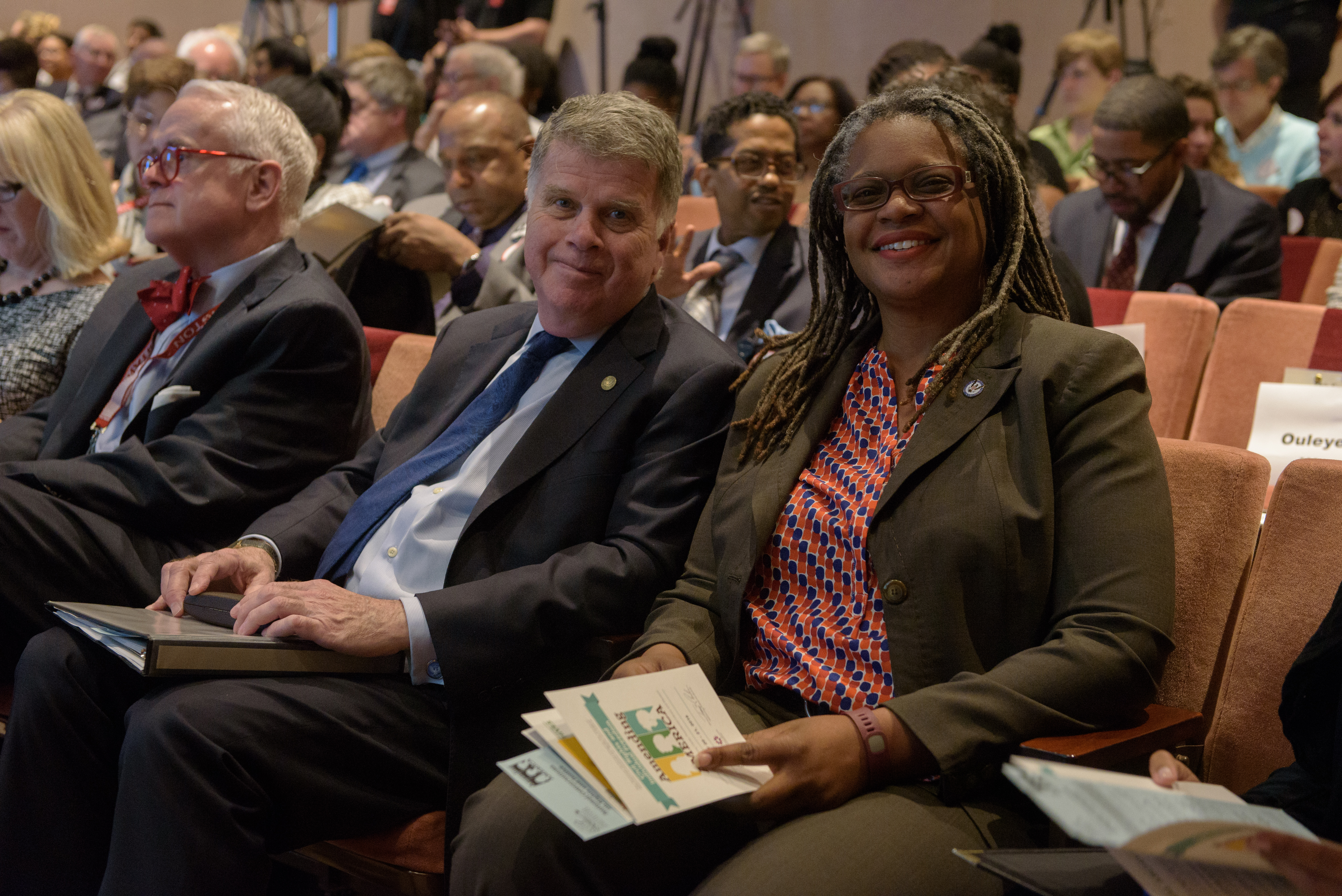
- Meredith Evans (right) with David S. Ferriero, Archivist of the United States.jpg
- Education: Clark Atlanta University; North Carolina State University; University of North Carolina at Chapel Hill
- Occupation: Archivist
- Title: Director of the Jimmy Carter Library and Museum

Meredith Rachelle Evans is an archivist, historian and scholar and the director of the Jimmy Carter Library and Museum in Atlanta. Her work focuses on the African-American experience in the United States, including the documentation of archival records from African-American churches in the Atlanta area, and the preservation of social media from recent civil rights protests such as those of the Ferguson unrest in Ferguson, Missouri after the shooting of Michael Brown.

== Education ==
Evans attended Friends Seminary and received her high school diploma in 1990. At Friends, she founded the student organization Cultural Awareness Reaching Everyone (CARE) and advocated for Black authors to be included in the curriculum.

She received a Bachelor's degree in History and a master's degree in library science from Clark Atlanta University. She holds a master's degree in public history from North Carolina State University and a PhD in library science (archives concentration) from the University of North Carolina at Chapel Hill. Her dissertation focused on the records management and retention practices of African American churches in the Atlanta area.

Dr. Evans has taught classes in library, archives and information sciences including Clark Atlanta University, Wayne State University, San José State University, and the University of North Carolina at Charlotte.

== Career ==
While a curator at Atlanta University Center, Evans was instrumental in obtaining an Andrew W. Mellon Foundation grant for the digitization of the papers of Martin Luther King Jr. As an archivist, she co-taught a workshop in archival preservation titled "The Lessons of Pilgrim Baptist Church: Preventing the Loss of Your Heritage," which addressed the care and preservation of church archives and records in the wake of a tragic fire that destroyed the historic Pilgrim Baptist Church in Chicago in early 2006.

Evans served as the Director of Special Collections at George Washington University (2008–2012), Associate University Librarian for Special Collections & Digital Programs at the University of North Carolina at Charlotte (2012–2014), and Associate University Librarian at Washington University in St. Louis (2012–2015). She was instrumental in the creation of "Documenting Ferguson," a community-curated digital repository documenting the unrest in Ferguson, Missouri, after the fatal shooting of Michael Brown by a police officer. She has written about the impact of new archival methods to "collect the now" as related to born-digital materials that are preserved by modern archives in a post-custodial era of archival science. In 2014, WUSTL joined with the University of California at Riverside and the Maryland Institute for Technology in the Humanities at the University of Maryland, College Park, and later received a Mellon Foundation grant to create "Documenting the Now: Supporting the Scholarly Use and Preservation of Social Media Content," an initiative to ethically collect and preserve Twitter feeds on topics of social justice for future scholarly research.

In November 2015, Dr. Evans was named as the new director of the Jimmy Carter Presidential Library and Museum in Atlanta. She continues to hold this office as of January 2025.

In April 2017, Evans was elected as Vice President/President Elect of the Society of American Archivists. She served as the 74th president of SAA from 2018 to 2020.

== Select bibliography ==
- Evans, Meredith Rachelle. (2006). Recordkeeping Practices in Selected Atlanta Area Black Churches. Dissertation. University of North Carolina at Chapel Hill.
- Evans, Meredith R. (2007). The Digitization of African American Publications. The Serials Librarian, 53(1-2), 203–210, DOI: 10.1300/J123v53n01_16
- Evans, Meredith R. (2015). Modern Special Collections: Embracing the Future While Taking Care of the Past. New Review of Academic Librarianship, 21(2), 116–128. DOI:10.1080/13614533.2015.1040926
- Foster, M.J. and Evans, M.R. (2016). "Libraries creating sustainable services during community crisis: Documenting Ferguson", Library Management, 37(6/7), 352–362. DOI:10.1108/LM-06-2016-0049

== Awards ==
- Association of Research Libraries Leadership Fellowship (2013)
- Fellow of the Society of American Archivists (2024)
