= Edie Hedlin =

American archivist and historian

Ethel W. (Edie) Hedlin (born 1944) is an American archivist and historian. She has held many positions within the archival profession, including service to the National Archives and Records Administration, Wells Fargo Bank, and the Ohio Historical Society. She was for several years a private consultant with extended service to the World Bank and the European Bank for Reconstruction and Development (EBRD). She retired from the position of Director of Smithsonian Institution Archives, having held that position from 1994 to 2005. She has served the Society of American Archivists as Council Member, chairperson of the Business Archives Committee, Vice President, and President. She was the Society's 49th president and served from 1993 to 1994. She was for several years a member of the NHPRC California Historical Records Advisory Board. Hedlin was a founding member of the Academy of Certified Archivists, having chaired the Task Force that created the academy.

== Career ==
Hedlin first began work within the archival profession with the Ohio Historical Society as the institutional records specialist and State archives specialist.

After earning her PhD from Duke University in 1974, she published her dissertation, "Earnest Cox and Colonization: A White Racist's Response to Black Repatriation, 1922-1966", which has been heavily cited throughout the archival and historical professions.

In 1975, Hedlin began working with the Wells Fargo Bank in San Francisco, California as their corporate archivist.

In 1994, Hedlin became Director of the Office of Smithsonian Institution Archives, which is responsible for the official records of the Smithsonian Institution. Before she left in 2005, she overlooked the transition to electronic and digital archives as well as the first websites of the Institution.

== Publications ==
Hedlin has written several books and articles on archival technique, including the 1978 article "Business Archives: An Introduction". Some other notable works include The Ohio Black History Guide (with Sara S. Fuller, 1975), "Chinatown" Revisited (1986), and Archival Programs in the Southeast: A Preliminary Assessment (1984).
