= Herman Kahn (archivist) =

American archivist

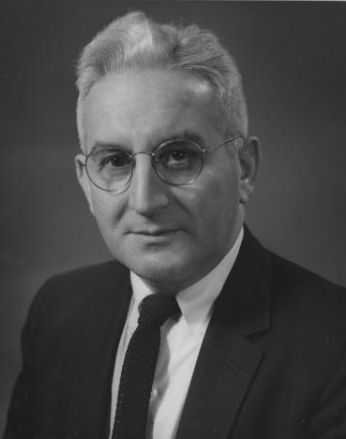
- Kahn in 1963
- Born: August 13, 1907; Rochester, New York
- Died: June 5, 1975 (aged 67); New Haven, Connecticut
- Occupation: archivist
- Spouse: Anne Suess Kahn

Herman Kahn (August 13, 1907 – June 5, 1975) was an American archivist and served as an Assistant Archivist of the United States between 1962 and 1968.

Kahn was born in Rochester, New York and studied history at the University of Minnesota. He received his bachelor's degree from the university in 1928 and a master's degree in 1931. After graduating, he worked briefly as a history professor and historian to the National Park Service.

In 1936, Kahn joined the staff of the newly formed National Archives, with responsibility for the archives of the Interior Department. He later worked as director of the Franklin D. Roosevelt Presidential Library from 1948 to 1961. In 1968, he left governmental service to lead the archives and manuscripts program at the Yale University Library, where he remained until his death in 1975.

He was also an active contributor to the archival profession, and he served in the Society of American Archivists as a member of council (1959-1963) and as president (1969-1970).
