= Kathleen D. Roe =

American archivist (born 1950)

- Born: November 3, 1950 (age 75)
- Education: Michigan State University; Wayne State University
- Occupation: Archivist
- Employer: New York State Archives
- Known for: Pioneer in archival description standards (MARC AMC format)
- Notable work: '
- Awards: NEH-Mellon Fellowships for the Study of Archival Information; Fellow of the Society of American Archivists

Kathleen D. Roe (born November 3, 1950) is an American archivist. She has recently retired from her position as Director of Archives and Records Management Operations at the New York State Archives. She managed the archives records management program and provided services to “63 state agencies and 4,300 local governments as well as the archival programs operating State Archives archival facility holding over 100,000 cubic feet of state government records.” She also overlooked several statewide programs that “provide training and advisory services to over 3,000 historical records programs.” She was the president of the Council of State Archivists and later chaired the Government Relations Committee and the Survey Management Team. Roe was the 70th president of the Society of American Archivists (SAA) from 2014–2015. She is currently traveling and speaking on archival processing and the importance of archives.

== Education ==
Roe earned her degree in history from Michigan State University and earned her degree in library science and archival administration from Wayne State University.

== Career ==
Roe is a Fellow of the Society of American Archivists and has served on or chaired several of their committees and task forces, including the “Committee on Archival Information Exchange, the Continuing Education and Professional Development Committee, and the Appointments Committee.” She has been an active member of many national and international archival practices research projects.

At the New York Archives, she has been involved in some of the first projects that introduced the MARC AMC format to public record repositories. She participated in the Working Group on Standards for Archival Description, which summarized the descriptive archival process of the 1980s, and is a leader in the development of descriptive standards in archival work.

For her work in documenting New York Latino communities, she has been honored by the Centro de Estudios Puertorriqueños, Hunter College. She has also been awarded three NEH-Mellon Fellowships for the Study of Archival Information.

Roe is also an active feminist and remains involved with the Women Archivists Roundtable of the SAA. She has had a monumental impact on women's involvement in archives and helping to bring forward unheard voices of women and minorities. In an interview with the Women Archivists Roundtable, Roe explains: "All the archival work I do, however intertwined it may be with technology, processes and procedures, is ultimately to bring those voices forward so that they can inform an incredible range of purposes from proving individual rights to molding public policy or providing the evidence for historical interpretation."

=== Published work ===
Roe has taught several workshops and seminars through SAA and written numerous articles in The American Archivist on the importance of archival work and the archival processing system. In one of her published journal articles, Archival Gothic to MARC Modern: Building Common Data Structures, she details her passion for archive method:

The author analyzes widely used manuals of archival description, discussing the elements of information recommended for inclusion in various kinds of finding aids and the implicit "data structures" intended to contain those elements. She also reviews recent developments, mostly related to automation efforts, that have led to more explicit definitions or data structures and presents issues that must be addressed in order to define a general archival information system standard.

In a review of Roe’s Arranging and Describing Archives and Manuscripts, Susan E. Davis of the College of Information Studies at the University of Maryland praises Roe’s contributions to archival studies. “Kathleen Roe is the perfect author to take on the challenge of explaining the evolution of arrangement and description theory and practice. She has been a leader in descriptive standards development throughout the series of changes brought about by several generations of technology.”

In Arranging and Describing Archives and Manuscripts, Roe describes the archival process step by step guidelines and explains the nature of archives and manuscripts as well as the functional role of arrangement and description. She explains the different stages of archival work, with acquisition and accessioning to arrangement and processing and finally the developing of accessing tools. Roe defines the principles of archiving and emphasizes the importance of context and description. Roe also describes the development of archival work and descriptive practice in Europe and North America.

She remains a passionate advocate for archives and their importance to everyone. In an interview with the Women Archivists Roundtable of the SAA, Roe elaborates on the relevance of archives:

Here are some examples of how we can explain why archives are essential evidence, why they are valuable to our society, and why they deserve support and wide use: Nine miners harbored in a closed shaft after an explosion, and are alive today because the rescuers used archival maps to find that closed shaft; a teacher uses a manumission record as the tangible evidence to help students explore the ideas of slavery and freedom; biologists use historic maps to identify potential sites for reforestation of the American chestnut; a 70 year old woman uses court records to locate her siblings who were adopted out to different families after the death of their parents. That’s why archives matter.
