= Society of American Archivists =

Membership association of professional archivists

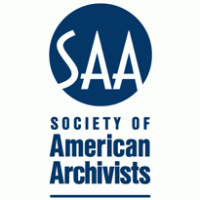
- Abbreviation: SAA
- Formation: December 1936
- Headquarters: Chicago, Illinois
- Members: 6,200+ (2021)
- President: Brenda Gunn
- Website: www2.archivists.org

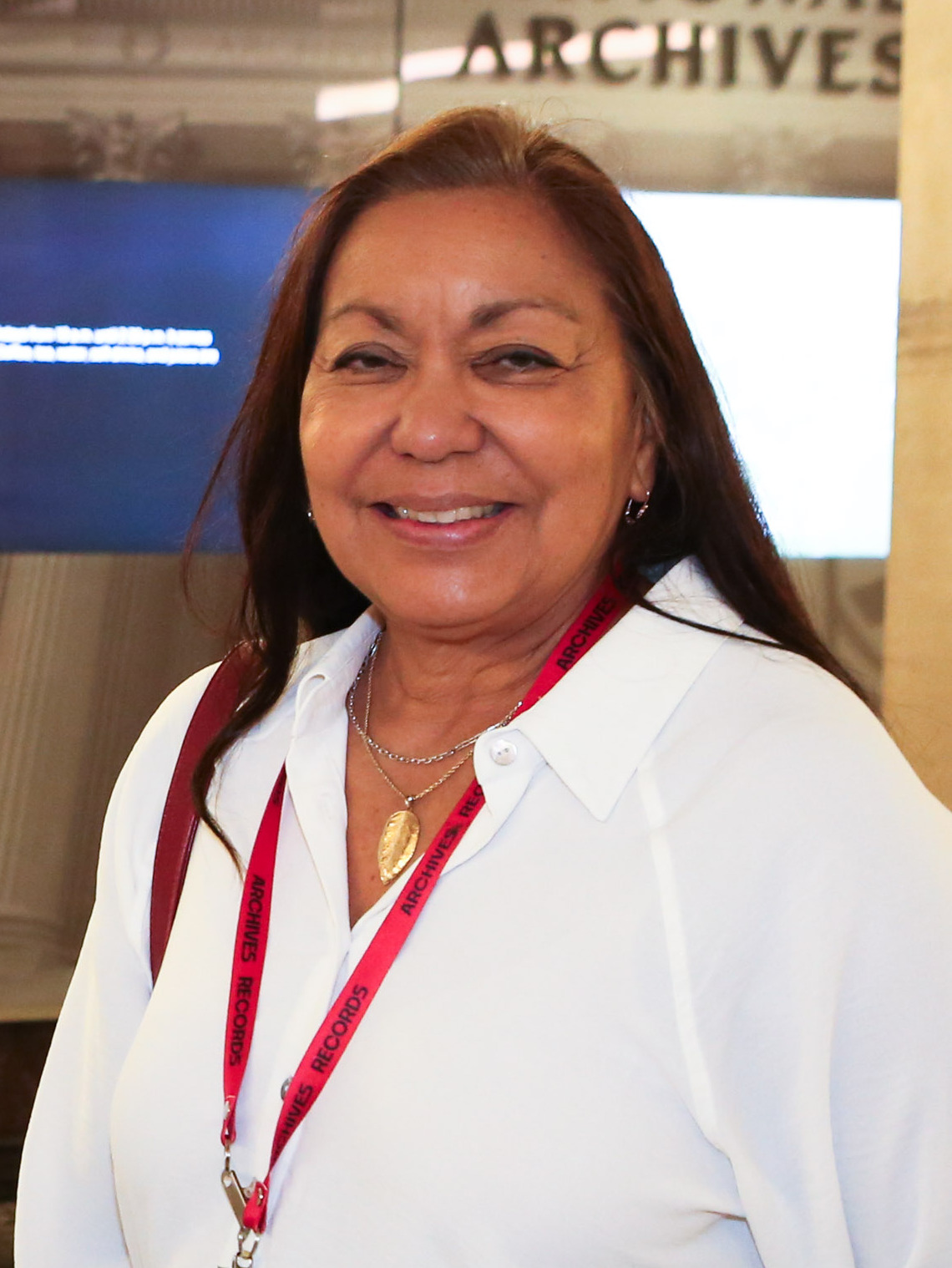
Former S.A.A. President Helen Wong Smith in July 2023 at the Society of American Archivists and Council of State Archivists Joint Annual Meeting Open House at the National Archives in Washington, D.C.

The Society of American Archivists is the oldest and largest archivist association in North America, serving the educational and informational needs of more than 5,000 individual archivist and institutional members. Established in 1936, the organization serves upwards of 6,200 individual and member institutions.

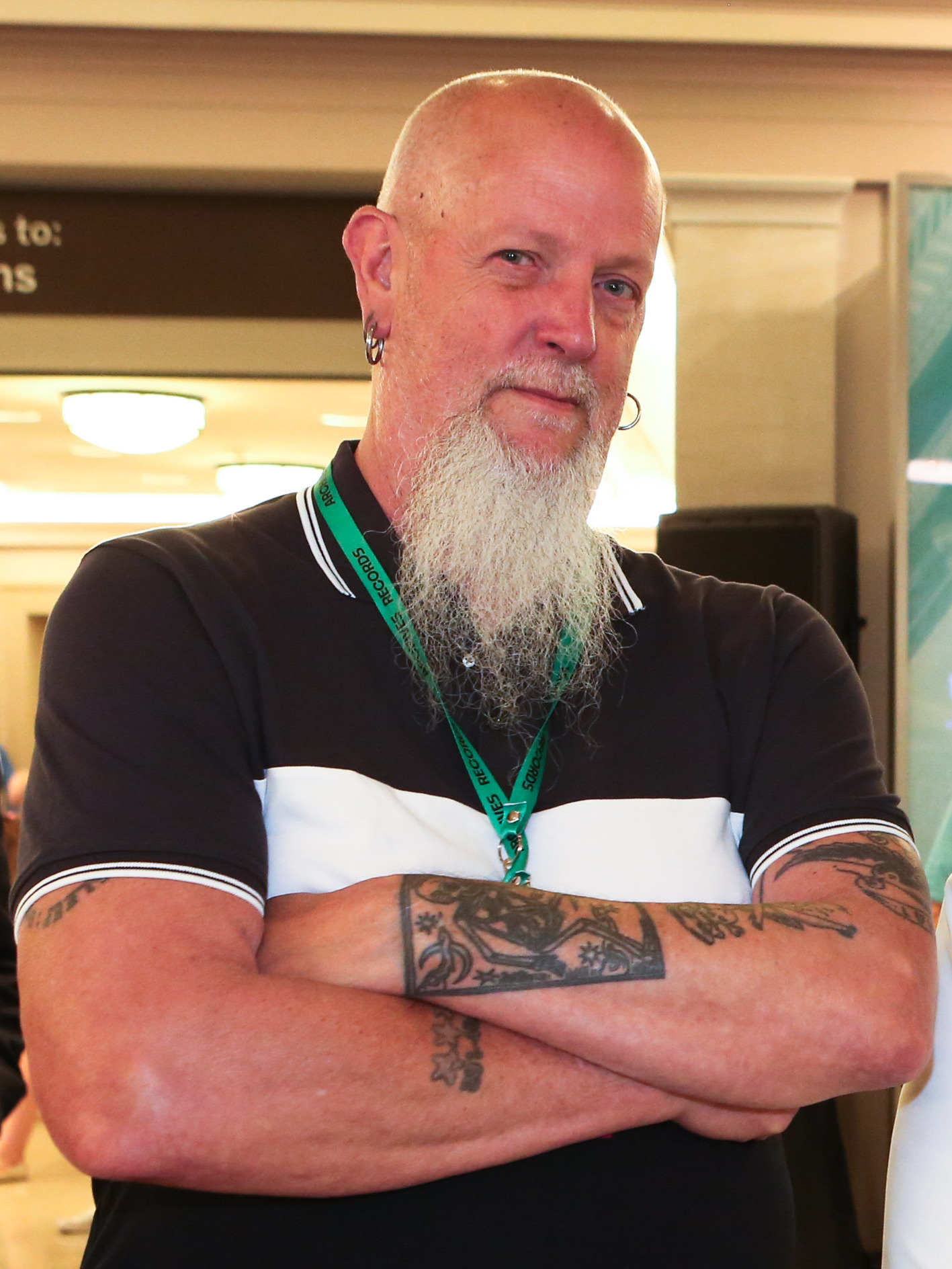
Terry Baxter, former President of the Society of American Archivists ('22–'23) at the Society of American Archivists – Council of State Archivists Joint Annual Meeting Open House at the National Archives in Washington, D.C., July 2023

The society supports its members and the archival profession through publication and professional workshop programs and semi-annual meetings. Currently, workshops are given all across the United States and attend to current archival concerns and issues such as Encoded Archival Description, the digitizing of archival materials, and preservation and conservation of materials, among others. The programs it offers include: Online On-Demand Programs, Online Real Time Programs and Face to Face Programs.

== History ==
The Society of American Archivists was established in 1936 on the heels of the creation of the National Archives. The organization was born in the wake of the dissolution of the Public Archives Commission of the American Historical Association. The early days of the organization were fraught with difficulty related to membership as well as professional identity. The American Library Association created a commission on archives, which founding president Albert R. Newsome found disrespectful. There was also tension between the public archives tradition championed by Margaret Cross Norton and the historical manuscripts tradition as the governing philosophy. Public archives tradition puts emphasis on records management and administrative aspects of archival work, whereas historical manuscripts focuses more on the preservation and maintenance of important documents for research purposes. The tension and debate between the two fundamental functions of archives would continue into the 1950s, spilling into elements like elections and where to hold annual meetings.

The first issue of the society's journal, the American Archivist, appeared in 1938. In 1942, U.S. President Franklin D. Roosevelt was elected as an honorary member of the SAA due to his commitment to archiving federal, state and local government documents. After World War II, SAA joined with other international archivist societies to create the International Council on Archives and an archives for the United Nations. A number of committees focused on various interests of the society, including Church Records and College and University Archives. These committees helped legitimize the society, which aided them in a 1956 dispute with National Association of State Libraries over the differences between their two professions. This eventually lead to a joint committee between the American Library Associate and SAA to discuss the nuances and differences of the two professions.

By the 1970s, the majority of membership in SAA was made up of college and university archivists. These archivists, as well as the influence of more progressive social justice movements, allowed for the restructuring the organization as a whole, democratizing elections and restructuring committees. There was also a push for better professional resources as well as education standards. Coming out of the 1960s, there was a large movement of activist archivists, with members taking a greater interest in political and social issues. This forced SAA to take stances on different contemporary public issues that affected the profession. Social historians like Howard Zinn and Sam Bass Warner brought their views to the annual SAA meeting 1971, challenging archivists to re-examine policies and assumptions.

In the 1980s, a large portion of the society's focus was on outreach. Systematic studies were conduct to assess who archives users were, how they used the archives, and why. The struggle for creating a professional identity continued as standards for education programs, certification, and institutional evaluation became the forefront of discussion. A Task Force on Goals and Priorities, created in 1982, aimed to amend those issues, attempting to unify the organization under one professional umbrella. New challenges also emerged with the widespread use of the Internet and digital technologies. SAA partnered with the Library of Congress in developing Encoded Archival Description in 1993. EAD is an XML Document Type Definition and a standard for encoding archival finding aids, allowing them to be made accessible online. SAA also offers certification for Digital Archives Specialists, which allows for the profession to work within the emerging technological landscape and capture digital records.

In November 2017, SAA released a Strategic plan for 2018–2020, which outlined four major goal areas for the future: advocating for archives and archivists, enhancing professional growth, advancing the field, and meeting members' needs.

== Archivists and Archives of Color Roundtable ==
=== 1970s ===
In the 1970s, the SAA began to collaborate with the American Association of Museums and the Association for State and Local History to form a Joint Committee on Opportunities for Minorities in Museums, Archives, and Historical Agencies. Phil Mason and Elsie Freivogel were appointed but outreach to minority members of the SAA was poor. Many minorities were unaware of the Joint Committee and expressed that there had not been any direct communications from the committee's representatives.

The final report of the SAA Task Force on Diversity states:

In 1972 SAA adopted the report of its Committee for the 1970s. Included among the Committee recommendations was a positive injunction to the nominating committee to make the Council more representative of and responsible to the diverse interests of the SAA by considering "archival interest, age, sex, geography, nationality, ethnicity, and race in the selection of a slate of candidates."

Also in the report, "no person should be nominated as a candidate for an SAA office who, in her or his job, flagrantly espouses or practices discrimination in regard to race, sex, nationality, or political or religious ideology." In 1978, the SAA established a joint Committee on Opportunities for Minorities. However, the group languished in part from a lack of funds.

=== 1980s: Task Force ===
The Archivists and Archives of Color Roundtable began as a Task Force on Minorities within the SAA. In 1981, archivists Diana Lachateñeré and Paula Williams drafted a resolution for the task force and members of the SAA approved the group. Thomas Battle, who also chaired the SAA's Diversity Committee, was appointed the chairman of the Task Force and John Fleckner, Archie Motley, Daniel T. Williams, and Paula Williams were appointed members. Diana Lachateñeré was chosen as the SAA representative for the Joint Committee on Minority Recruitment, replacing Phil Mason.

In the beginning, members noticed that the task force did not have much representation. In an interview with AACR History, Karen Jefferson stated:

At the beginning of the minorities task force Native Americans, people of Latin American and Caribbean descent; and Gay, Lesbian, Bisexual and Transgender were included under the umbrella of minorities. Although minorities share some broad experiences as minorities, each group has unique concerns specific to their culture and experience.

It was not until 1982 that a representative of Hispanic archivists was appointed: Idilio Garicia Pena. In its six years of existence, the task force made several recommendations to the SAA Council. These recommendations eventually became the foundation of the Archivists and Archives of Color Roundtable, and they still pursue them today. Some of their recommendations were to:

- Develop a roster of minorities working in the profession.
- Establish a membership committee to help in recruitment efforts for the Society.
- Develop a policy statement regarding recruitment of minorities.
- Develop an organizational handbook to increase membership's knowledge of the Society's structure and functions.
- Provide orientation for new members at the annual meeting.
- Lower introductory dues rates for new members.
- Establish a single-day registration fee for the annual meeting.
- Seek funds to develop programs to address needs of minorities in the profession.
- Financially support SAA's own activities that are designed to address issues related to minorities in the profession.
- Establish a scholarship or fellowship to support the development of minorities in the profession.

Many of these goals were met and the creation of the task force proved immediately to be a vehicle for broader minority participation in the SAA, especially in leadership.

=== 1980s: Roundtable ===
In 1987, the task force dissembled, restricted in their effectiveness because of a lack of interest and support from the SAA. The task force made the recommendation that a roundtable be created for minorities, which was formed the same year. Nine SAA members helped to found the roundtable: Diana Lachatanere, Wilda Logan, Carol Rudisell, Karen Jefferson, Ervin Jordan, Clifford Muse, Thomas Battle, Jo Ellen El-Bashir, and Brenda Banks. Diana Lachateñeré and Carol Rudisell served as the coordinators. In September 1987, the AACR held their first meeting in New York City at the annual SAA conference. At this meeting, the structure of the roundtable was adopted with two co-chairs, one elected annually with elections every year. Their first year, Carol Rudisell and Donna Wells co-chaired while Diana Lachateñeré was elected as chair of the Manuscript Section, declining to serve as co-chair.

It was not required to be a member of the SAA in order to participate in the roundtable. This allowed for a freer space in which the roundtable could interact with more minorities among the archival profession. But SAA membership would be encouraged and the chairpersons were required to be SAA members in good standing.

There was a lengthy debate on the name of the roundtable, varying from Minorities Roundtable to African American and Third World Archivists Roundtable. In 1994, the name was chosen to be the Archivists and Archives of Color Roundtable.

==== Newsletter and directory ====
In 1987, the roundtable began publishing a newsletter through the SAA, although not without objections from society members on costs. Thomas Battle then proposed that Howard University would completely fund the newsletter and even publish and distribute it for free. These newsletters were available to anyone who was interested in African American archives, manuscripts and collections. In less than a year, Battle returned to the SAA with a high percentage of popularity and interest in the newsletter among not just African Americans but all archivists. This newsletter continued to be funded by Howard University and was later used as a model for other roundtables of the SAA.

Lachateñeré and Rudisell were the first editors and after the first year, Karen Jefferson and Ruth Hill edited the newsletter. Other editors over the years include Kathryn Neal, Cathy Lynn Mundale, and Jo Ellen El-Bashir, who served one of the longest tenures as editor. In 2003, under editor Rose Roberta, the newsletter became available electronically and continues to be published online. Today, the newsletter continues to be the main source of communication for the roundtable members. The newsletter provides information on different members, institutions, the SAA, archives, and the activities and achievements of the roundtable.

In 1991, Carol Rudisell compiled the first membership directory with racial/ethnic heritage listed for the members. In 1996, this was compiled by Karen Jefferson in the Archivists of Color Directory. This is not a directory on the entire membership of the roundtable but a directory of the archivists of color involved in the AACR. Each archivist has a brief biography, including their education, experience and the institutions they are affiliated with. In 2012, a directory was listed on the AACR website including only the name, job title and contact information of the archivist.

==== Harold T. Pinkett Minority Student Award ====
Several members of the roundtable, including Wilda Logan, helped to establish the Harold T. Pinkett Minority Student Award in 1993. This award is given to recognize graduate students of color who are actively working toward becoming professional archivists in the SAA. The award is sponsored by the AACR and funded through the SAA, named after Harold T. Pinkett who was the first African American archivist to serve at the National Archives. The SAA Council acknowledged the contributions of Harold T. Pinkett in this resolution:

Whereas, Harold T. Pinkett served with distinction during his long tenure at the National Archives and Records Service; and Whereas Harold T. Pinkett has been a scholar, archival educator, and mentor who has made important contributions to the archives profession; Therefore be it resolved that in recognition of his lifetime achievements and contributions to the archival profession, the Archivists and Archives of Color Roundtable supports the renaming of the SAA Minority Student Award to the Harold T. Pinkett Minority Student Award.

=== 1990s ===
The Task Force on Organizational Effectiveness (TFOE) was appointed in 1995–1996. One of the main issues of the task force was to address diversity in the SAA as well as in the archival profession. From this came the creation of the Task Force on Diversity, chaired by Brenda Banks with members Anne Difffendal, John Fleckner, Susan Fox, Karen Jefferson, Deborah King (Burns), Joan Krizak, and Kathleen Roe. The task force investigated the SAA to see where they supported or weakened diversity, discussing possible solutions to improve or encourage it in the SAA as well as the archival profession. Their final report recommended that the SAA:

- Develop an organizational position statement that articulates SAA's commitment to becoming a more diverse organization
- Incorporate diversity into SAA's strategic planning process.
- Reinforce and expand existing activities within SAA that support diversity.
- Identify and establish new initiatives that may assist SAA in its efforts to become a more diverse organization.

After the Council accepted the report, they approved a statement on diversity that was released on June 13, 1999:

The Society of American Archivists is committed to integrating diversity concerns and perspectives into all aspects of the activities and into the fabric of the profession as a whole. SAA is also committed to the goal of a Society membership that reflects the broad diversity of American society. SAA believes that these commitments are essential to the effective pursuit of the archival mission “to ensure the identification, preservation, and use the nation's historical record.

Five years later, the SAA Council established a Committee on Diversity in response to complaints that they were moving slowly in implementing the recommendations of the Task Force on Diversity. After much debate, they established a Task Force on Diversity with its first goal to define 'diversity.' They were also asked to investigate "how and to what extent issues of democracy are being addressed by the Society." The Task Force on Diversity submitted its last report in February 1999. In 1996, one of the few articles written on diversity in the archives profession was published. Kathryn M. Neal details the importance of diversity in archives:

Expanding the numbers of staff members of color and tapping their potential should (and no doubt would) enhance the overall functions of archives and manuscript repositories. New ideas would likely be stimulated in areas that include, but certainly are not limited to, donor relations (for instance, how to approach and document members of growing communities of color most effectively) and reference/access (determining how to improve services as user groups become increasingly diverse, or how to attract a more diverse pool of researchers if society's changing demographics are not reflected.

=== Today ===
Many of the original goals of the roundtable exist today. On their website, they have stated their purposes as to "identify and address the concerns of archivists of African, Asian, Latino and Native American descent; promote wider participation of said archivists in the archival profession; and promote the preservation of archival materials that pertain to people of color."

However, the roundtable still recognizes the need for more to be done for minorities, especially in archives. In a report made after the Pulse nightclub shooting in Orlando, the AACR stated: "As archivists, we cannot accept invisibility. As a profession, we cannot continue to accept historical erasure and whitewashing through binary historical practices."

In 2003, the SAA Council created a subcommittee to see the status of the SAA's diversity efforts. In May 2003, they reported that some of the recommendations by the Task Force on Diversity had been addressed while others had not, and the actions had not been effectively reported back to SAA members. The council then voted for a Committee on Diversity. In August 2003, the Council approved the committee:

The SAA Committee on Diversity works to ensure that the organization's services, activities, policies, communications, and products support the goal of a more diverse SAA and professional archival community. It functions as a catalyst for new diversity-related initiatives, developed in coordination with various SAA entities, and as the organization's "conscience" in monitoring, evaluating, advocating, and reporting on matters pertaining to the diversity of archival practitioners and documentation.

In 2007, Elizabeth W. Adkins gave her presidential address at the SAA annual meeting in Chicago and highlighted the importance of diversity. "SAA has been working to address diversity concerns for more than thirty-five years, sometimes effectively and sometimes not so effectively." In her speech, she focused on SAA's definition of diversity in comparison to others and how they have progressed.

Adkins states that in 1982, only 2.8% of archivists were nonwhite but in 2004, that number jumped to 7%. SAA is only slightly better with about 10% of its members identifying as part of a minority or ethnic group. Adkins compares this with the national population, which is about 25% of nonwhite people, claiming "both SAA and the profession have a very long way to go to achieve racial and ethnic diversity." But it's a start.

Since 2002, Council meetings and discussion have consistently focused on diversity. Some of the approved motions on diversity from these meetings are:

- Diversity has been and will be incorporated into every Council agenda for the foreseeable future.
- The Council, SAA staff, and all SAA units must report on diversity initiatives.
- The president-elect and the Appointments Committee are required to report on the demographics of all committee appointments and on what was done to seek diversity in committee appointments.
- The Program Committee and Host Committee must report on efforts to address diversity issues in the planning and scheduling of annual meeting programming.
- The Diversity Committee has been asked to provide a report on the state of diversity at the annual business meeting each year.

At the 2014 Conference, Bergis Jules and Edward Summers conceived the idea of a set of tools to work with Twitter data. This has become the Documenting the Now (DocNow) project within the Shift Collective.

== Women Archivists Section (WArS) ==
The Women Archivists Roundtable (WAR) monitors the status of women archivists and promotes the participation of women in the archives profession, specifically in areas of the Society of American Archivists.

=== History ===
Although many women archivists helped shaped the SAA, the status of women in the archival profession did not receive much attention until the 1970s. In 1972, the SAA established the Committee on the Status of Women in the Archival Profession. The committee sought to address under representation and identify the barriers and obstacles for advancement. The overall membership population of women had grown since the SAA's inception, but few had risen to the positions of president, officer, or council member.

The committee conducted two surveys, one of archivists and one of directors. Through these surveys, the committee discovered that although many women had comparable education and experience, few of them had risen to administrative positions.

At the same time that the committee was created, the Women's Caucus was founded and began publishing The SAA Women's Caucus Newsletter.

In 1998, the Committee evolved into the Women's Professional Archival Issues Roundtable. In 2000, this name was changed to the Women Archivists Roundtable. In 2017, the name was changed once again to its current name, the Women Archivists Section (WArS), like the rest of the SAA groups.

=== Surveys ===
In 2000 and 2001, the WAR Steering Committee created a survey to analyze the relationship between women archivists and the archival profession. The survey was completed and published in August 2001 and included 227 women archivists. The survey found that most of the members (77.1%) came from East of the Rocky Mountains and 50.2% represented the academic sector as professional staff (69.6%) or archivist (53.2%). Most of them held a Bachelor's Degree (97.2%) as well as a Master's (63.6%) and/or a Master's in Library Science (54.3%). 73% were members of the SAA while only 10% were members of WAR. Supervisors were 54.4% women and only 24.1% stated that they put in no overtime. And finally, "98.7% of respondents felt that unearthing women's history continues to be important, yet only 77.1% make a concerted effort to do so and only 61.9% of respondents actually work with materials related specifically to women."

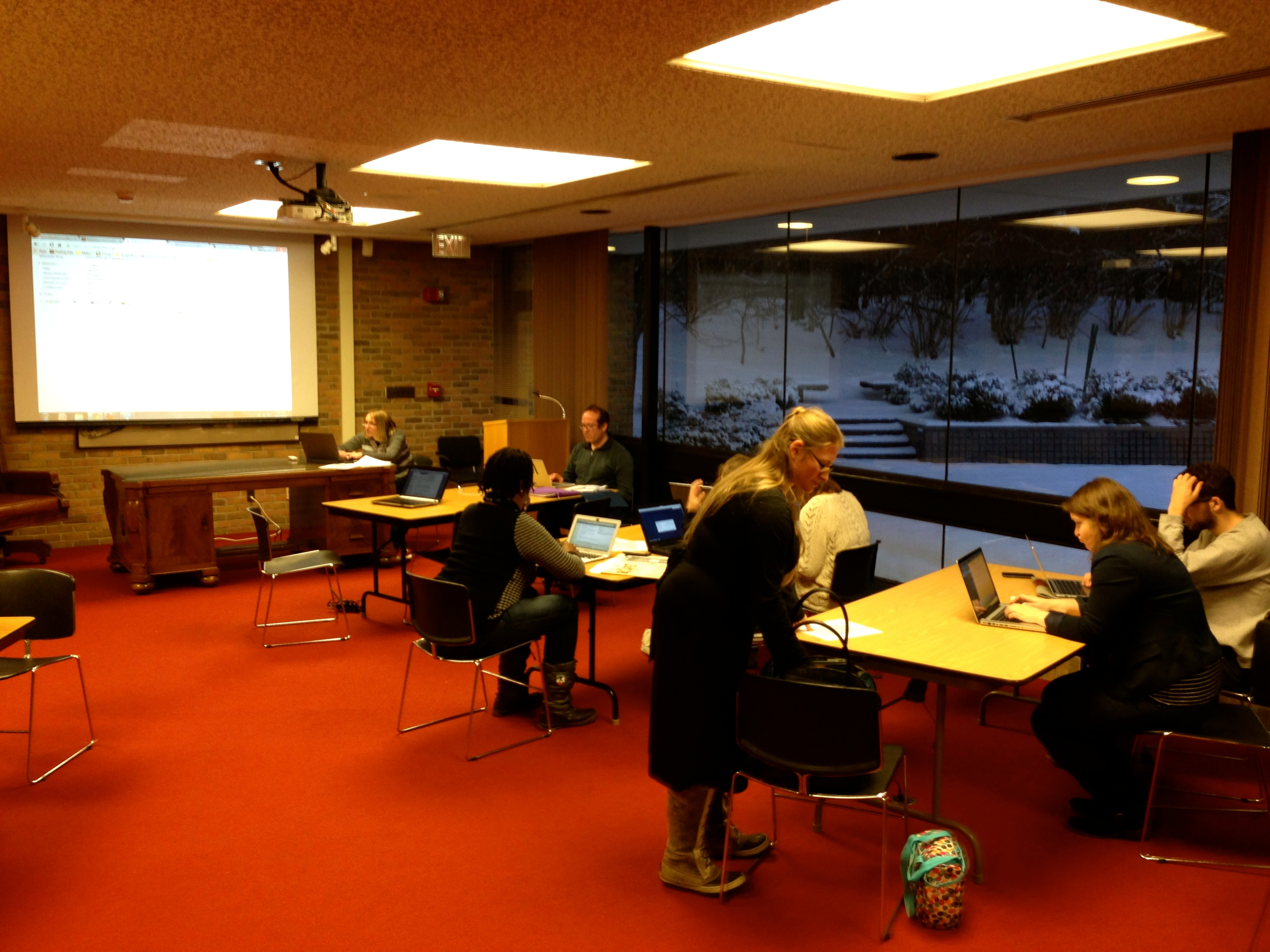
University of Michigan student chapter of the Society of American Archivists collaborated with the Bentley Historical Library to host the UM-SAA Wikipedia Edit-A-Thon in 2014.

More recent surveys have indicated the rise of women in archival professions, or even a "feminization" of the profession. Yet Wikipedia does not show this. In 2016, research discovered that only 50 articles exist on Wikipedia for female archivists, compared to 260 for male archivists. And for specifically American archivists, only 15 existed for women compared to 93 for men. So in 2016, WArS hosted a Wikipedia Edit-a-Thon in Atlanta, and remotely, to encourage more women editors and more articles on women archivists.

In a survey conducted in 2017, researchers found that of the 2,170 respondents, 1,717 were members of the SAA, which was at a membership of over 6,000 in 2017. Therefore, this survey reflected about one quarter of the SAA membership in 2017. Of the total respondents, 87.7% were white and 84.3% were female. Only 3.1% responded stating they were African American, while 3.6% answered they were Latinx American and 3.2% said they were bi- or multi-racial. Over 92% stated that the highest education they'd received was a Master's degree. Since 1956, which had a membership of 33% women, the percentage of women membership has grown to be over 82%.

=== Today ===
The Roundtable is governed by two co-chairs who must be members of the SAA, and they are elected on staggered two-year terms. On their website, WAR states their mission is to "ensure that the Society of American Archivists (SAA) conscientiously deals with issues that affect the status of women within the profession and the Society." Under their goals and objectives, they have aimed to:

- Monitor the status of women within the archival profession.
- Encourage the participation of women in all phases of SAA business and other activities as well as in the archival profession as a whole.
- Monitor gender balance on SAA programs.
- Nominate candidates for Fellow in SAA.
- Monitor the continuance of day care at the SAA annual meeting.
- Meet annually in conjunction with the SAA meeting.
- Conduct its business in accordance with Section IX. of the SAA Governance Manual.

== Publications ==
On top of book publications, SAA offers the following regular publications:

- American Archivist: the peer-reviewed scholarly journal of SAA. Published semi-annually, it aims to cover theoretical and practical aspects of the profession, cultural, legal, technological, as well as social issues surrounding collecting, preserving, and accessing archival records and materials through journal articles, case studies, and product reviews.
- Archival Outlook: formally the SAA Newsletter. Started in the 1970s, the newsletter is published 6 times a year and focuses on best practices of the profession, day to day concerns of the archivist, and updates on organization business.
- In the Loop: bi-weekly e-newsletter that offers updates on SAA activities and interests.

== Awards ==
The Society recognizes archivists' achievements with awards for advocacy, writing, and contributions to the profession. The highest honor is that of Fellow, a distinction awarded since 1957. Every year, there is a new Distinguished Fellows Class, which cannot exceed 5% of the total SAA membership in a given year. To qualify for nomination, a candidate must meet all the academic and technical requirements of the profession, be a member of the organization for at least 7 years, and make significant and high quality contributions in the form of scholarly writing, running workshops, and participating in the organization's leadership or other administrative roles.

In 1974, after the death of Sister M. Claude Lane, an award was sponsored in her name by the Society of Southwest Archivists. It is awarded annually by the SAA while being fully established, sponsored, and funded by the Society of Southwest Archivists.

The SAA also recognizes graduate students of color who are interested in the archival profession. The award was first established in 1993 and was later named after Harold T. Pinkett.

== Presidents ==
1. 1936–1939: Albert R. Newsome, University of North Carolina
2. 1939–1941: Waldo Gifford Leland, American Council of Learned Societies
3. 1941–1943: Robert D. W. Connor, National Archives and Records Administration
4. 1943–1945: Margaret Cross Norton, Illinois State Library
5. 1945–1947: Solon J. Buck, National Archives and Records Administration
6. 1947–1949: Christopher Crittenden, North Carolina Department of Archives and History
7. 1949–1951: Philip C. Brooks, National Security Resources Board
8. 1951–1953: William D. McCain, Mississippi Department of Archives and History
9. 1953–1954: Wayne C. Grover, National Archives and Records Administration
10. 1954–1955: Morris L. Radoff, Maryland Hall of Records
11. 1955–1956: Ernst M. Posner, American University
12. 1956–1957: Lester J. Cappon, Colonial Williamsburg Inc.
13. 1957–1958: William D. Overman, Firestone Library
14. 1958–1959: Oliver Wendell Holmes, National Archives and Records Administration
15. 1959–1960: Mary G. Bryan, Georgia State Archives
16. 1960–1961: Philip M. Hamer, National Archives and Records Administration
17. 1961–1962: Robert H. Bahmer, National Archives and Records Administration
18. 1962–1963: Leon deValinger, Jr., Delaware State Archives
19. 1963–1964: Everett O. Alldredge, National Archives and Records Administration
20. 1964–1965: W. Kaye Lamb, Public Archives of Canada
21. 1965–1966: Dolores C. Renze, Colorado State Archives
22. 1966–1967: Herbert E. Angel, National Archives and Records Administration
23. 1967–1968: Clifford K. Shipton, Harvard University
24. 1968–1969: H. G. Jones, North Carolina Department of Archives and History
25. 1969–1970: Herman Kahn, Yale University
26. 1970–1971: Philip P. Mason, Wayne State University
27. 1971–1972: Charles E. Lee, South Carolina Department of Archives and History
28. 1972–1973: Wilfred I. Smith, Public Archives of Canada
29. 1973–1974: F. Gerald Ham, State Historical Society of Wisconsin
30. 1974–1975: James B. Rhoads, National Archives and Records Administration
31. 1975–1976: Elizabeth E. Hamer Kegan, Library of Congress
32. 1976–1977: Robert M. Warner, University of Michigan
33. 1977–1978: Walter Rundell Jr., University of Maryland
34. 1978–1979: Hugh A. Taylor, Public Archives of Canada
35. 1979–1980: Maynard J. Brichford, University of Illinois, Urbana-Champaign
36. 1980–1981: Ruth W. Helmuth, Case Western Reserve University
37. 1981–1982: Edward Weldon, National Archives and Records Administration
38. 1982–1983: J. Frank Cook, University of Wisconsin
39. 1983–1984: David B. Gracy II, Texas State Archives
40. 1984–1985: Andrea Hinding, University of Minnesota
41. 1985–1986: Shonnie Finnegan, State University of New York at Buffalo
42. 1986–1987: William L. Joyce, Princeton University
43. 1987–1988: Sue E. Holbert, Minnesota Historical Society
44. 1988–1989: Frank B. Evans, National Archives and Records Administration
45. 1989–1990: John A. Fleckner, Smithsonian Institution
46. 1990–1991: Trudy H. Peterson, National Archives and Records Administration
47. 1991–1992: Frank G. Burke, University of Maryland
48. 1992–1993: Anne R. Kenney, Cornell University
49. 1993–1994: Edie Hedlin, Consultant
50. 1994–1995: Maygene Daniels, National Gallery of Art
51. 1995–1996: Brenda Banks, Georgia Department of Archives and History
52. 1996–1997: Nicholas C. Burckel, Marquette University
53. 1997–1998: William J. Maher, University of Illinois, Urbana-Champaign
54. 1998–1999: Luciana Duranti, University of British Columbia
55. 1999–2000: H. Thomas Hickerson, Cornell University
56. 2000–2001: Lee J. Stout, Pennsylvania State University
57. 2001–2002: Steven L. Hensen, Duke University
58. 2002–2003: Peter B. Hirtle, Cornell University Library
59. 2003–2004: Timothy L. Ericson, University of Wisconsin-Milwaukee
60. 2004–2005: Randall C. Jimerson, Western Washington University
61. 2005–2006: Richard Pearce-Moses, Arizona State Library Archives and Public Records
62. 2006–2007: Elizabeth W. Adkins, Ford Motor Company Archives
63. 2007–2008: Mark A. Greene, American Heritage Center, University of Wyoming
64. 2008–2009: Frank J. Boles, Clarke Historical Library
65. 2009–2010: Peter Gottlieb, Archives Division, Wisconsin Historical Society
66. 2010–2011: Helen Tibbo, School of Information and Library Science, University of North Carolina at Chapel Hill
67. 2011–2012: Gregor Trinkaus-Randall, Massachusetts Board of Library Commissioners
68. 2012–2013: Jackie M. Dooley, OCLC Research
69. 2013–2014: Danna C. Bell, The Library of Congress
70. 2014–2015: Kathleen D. Roe, New York State Archives
71. 2015–2016: Dennis Meissner, Minnesota Historical Society
72. 2016–2017: Nancy McGovern, MIT
73. 2017–2018: Tanya Zanish-Belcher, Wake Forest University
74. 2018–2020: Meredith Evans, Jimmy Carter Presidential Library and Museum
75. 2020–2021: Rachel Vagts, Denver Public Library
76. 2021–2022: Courtney Chartier, Columbia University
77. 2022–2023: Terry Baxter, Multnomah County Records Program
78. 2023 – 2024: Helen Wong Smith, University of Hawai'i at Mānoa
79. 2024 – 2025: Tomaro Taylor, University of South Florida
80. 2025 – 2026: Derek T. Mosley, Auburn Avenue Research Library on African American Culture and History, Fulton County Library System
81. 2026 – 2027: Brenda Gunn, University of Virginia
82. 2027 – 2028: Alison Clemens, Beinecke Rare Book and Manuscript Library

== Prior and upcoming meetings ==
Meetings of the Society of American Archivists are often held jointly with other organizations such as the Council of State Archivists (CoSA), and the National Association of Government Archives and Records Administrators (NAGARA).

Meeting	Date	Venue	Location	Theme	Joint meeting
94	2030 Aug 14 - 17	Philadelphia Marriott Downtown	Philadelphia, PA	ARCHIVES * RECORDS 2030	
93	2029 July 18 - 21	Detroit Marriott at the Renaissance Center	Detroit, MI	ARCHIVES * RECORDS 2029	
92	2028 Aug 23 - 26	Washington Hilton	Washington, DC	ARCHIVES * RECORDS 2028	
91	2027 Aug 25 - 28	Sheraton Grand Chicago Riverwalk	Chicago, IL	ARCHIVES * RECORDS 2027: Archives and Archivists in the Here and Now	
90	2026 July 29 - Aug 1	Hyatt Regency New Orleans	New Orleans, LA	ARCHIVES*RECORDS 2026	
89	2025 August 24 - 27	Hilton Anaheim	Anaheim, CA	ARCHIVES*RECORDS 2025	
88	2024 August 15 - 17	Hilton Chicago	Chicago, IL	ARCHIVES*RECORDS 2024	
87	2023 July 26-29	Washington Hilton	Washington, DC	ARCHIVES*RECORDS 2023	CoSA
86	2022 August 25-27	Sheraton Boston Hotel	Boston, MA	ARCHIVES*RECORDS 2022	
85	2021 August 2-6	Virtual		ARCHIVES*RECORDS 2021	
84	2020 August 5-8	Virtual		ARCHIVES*RECORDS 2020	CoSA
83	2019 July 31-August 6	JW Marriott Austin	Austin, TX	ARCHIVES*RECORDS 2019	CoSA
82	2018 August 12–18	Marriott Wardman Park Hotel	Washington, DC	ARCHIVES*RECORDS 2018	CoSA, NAGARA
81	2017 July 23–29	Oregon Convention Center	Portland, OR	ARCHIVES 2017: alike/different	
80	2016 July 31-August 6	Hilton Atlanta	Atlanta, GA	ARCHIVES*RECORDS 2016	CoSA
79	2015 August 16–22	Cleveland Convention Center	Cleveland, OH	ARCHIVES 2015	
78	2014 August 10–16	Marriott Wardman Park Hotel	Washington, DC	ARCHIVES*RECORDS: Ensuring Access	CoSA, NAGARA
77	2013 August 11–17	Hilton New Orleans Riverside	New Orleans, LA	ARCHIVES New Orleans 2013	CoSA
76	2012 August 6–11	San Diego Hilton Bayfront	San Diego, CA	Beyond Borders: San Diego 2012	
75	2011 August 22–27	Hyatt Regency Chicago	Chicago, IL	ARCHIVES 360°	
74	2010 August 10–15	Marriott Wardman Park Hotel	Washington, DC	ARCHIVES*RECORDS / DC 2010	CoSA, NAGARA
73	2009 August 11–16	Hilton Austin	Austin, TX	Sustainable Archives: AUSTIN 2009	CoSA
72	2008 August 26–30	Hilton San Francisco	San Francisco, CA	ARCHIVES 2008: Archival R/Evolution & Identities	
71	2007 August 26-September 2	The Fairmont Chicago	Chicago, IL	ARCHIVES / CHICAGO 2007	
70	2006 July 31-August 5	Washington Hilton	Washington, DC	DC 2006: Joint Annual Meeting of CoSA, NAGARA, and SAA	CoSA, NAGARA
69	2005 August 14–21	Hilton New Orleans Riverside	New Orleans, LA	2005 Annual Meeting	
68	2004 August 2–8	Boston Park Plaza Hotel	Boston, MA	2004 Annual Meeting	
67	2003 August 18–24	Century Plaza Hotel and Tower	Los Angeles, CA	2003 Annual Meeting in Los Angeles, CA	
66	2002 August 19–25	Sheraton Birmingham Hotel	Birmingham, AL	2002 Annual Meeting in Birmingham, AL	
65	2001 August 27-September 2	Washington Hilton and Towers	Washington, DC	2001 Annual Meeting in Washington, D.C.	
64	2000 August 28-September 3	Adams Mark Hotel	Denver, Colorado		
63	1999 August 23–29	Pittsburgh Hilton & Towers	Pittsburgh, PA		
62	1998 September 2–6	Walt Disney World Dolphin Hotel	Orlando, Florida		
61	1997 September 3–7	Fairmont Hotel	Chicago, IL		
60	1996 August 24-September 1	Sheraton Harbor Island Hotel	San Diego, CA		
59	1995 August 24-September 3	Washington Hilton & Towers	Washington, DC		
58	1994 September 7–11	Westin Hotel	Indianapolis, Indiana		
57	1993 September 1–5	Sheraton Hotel	New Orleans, LA		
56	1992 September 12–17	Le Centre Sheraton Hotel	Montreal, Quebec, Canada		
55	1991 September 25–29	Adam's Mark Hotel	Philadelphia, Pennsylvania		
54	1990 August 30-September 3	Westin Hotel	Seattle, WA		
53	1989 October 25–29	Clarion Hotel	St. Louis, MO		
52	1988 September 29-October 2	Westin Peachtree Plaza	Atlanta, GA		
51	1987 September 2–6	Grand Hyatt Hotel	New York, NY		
50	1986 August 27–31	Marriott Hotel	Chicago, IL		
49	1985 October 28-November 1	Hyatt Regency Hotel	Austin, TX		
48	1984 August 30-September 3	Capital Hilton Hotel	Washington, DC		
47	1983 October 5–8	Leamington Hotel	Minneapolis and St. Paul, MN		
46	1982 October 19–22	Boston Park Plaza Hotel	Boston, MA		
45	1981 September 1–4	University of California	Berkeley, CA		
44	1980 September 30-October 3	Netherland Hilton Hotel	Cincinnati, OH		
43	1979 September 25–29	Palmer House	Chicago, IL		
42	1978 October 3–6	Hyatt Regency Hotel	Nashville, TN		
41	1977 October 4–7	Hotel Utah	Salt Lake City, UT		
40	1976 September 27-October 1	Statler Hilton Hotel	Washington, DC		
39	1975 September 30-October 3	Sheraton Hotel	Philadelphia, PA		
38	1974 October 1–4	Royal York Hotel	Toronto, Ontario, Canada		
37	1973 September 25–28	Chase-Park Plaza Hotel	St. Louis, MO		
36	1972 October 31-November 3	Columbus Sheraton Hotel	Columbus, OH		
35	1971 October 12–15	Sheraton Palace Hotel	San Francisco, CA		
34	1970 September 29-October 2	Shoreham Hotel	Washington, DC		
33	1969 October 8–10	Park Motor Inn	Madison, WI		
32	1968 September 30-October 2	Chateau Laurier	Ottawa, Ontario, Canada		
31	1967 October 18–20	LaFonda Hotel	Santa Fe, NM		
30	1966 October 5–8	Marriott Motel Hotel	Atlanta, GA		
29	1965 October 6–8	New York Hilton	New York, NY		
28	1964 October 6–10	Commodore Perry Hotel	Austin, TX		
27	1963 October 2–5	Hotel Sir Walter	Raleigh, NC		
25	1961 October 5–7	Continental Hotel	Kansas City and Independence, MO		
24	1960 October 4–7	Hotel Somerset	Boston, MA		
23	1959 October 7–9	Benjamin Franklin Hotel	Philadelphia, PA		
22	1958 August 17–20	Hotel Utah	Salt Lake City, UT		
21	1957 October 2–4	Deshler-Hilton Hotel	Columbus, OH		
20	1956 October 11–12	Willard Hotel	Washington, DC		
19	1955 October 9–11	Andrew Jackson Hotel	Nashville, TN		
18	1954 September 12–14	Williamsburg Lodge	Williamsburg, VA		
17	1953 September 13–15	Park Shelton Hotel	Detroit and Dearborn, MI		
16	1952 October 27–28	Hotel Lafayette	Lexington, KY		
15	1951 October 15–16	Carvel Hall Hotel	Annapolis, MD		
14	1950 October 9–10	Hotel Loraine	Madison, WI		
13	1949 September 19–20	Chateau Frontenac	Quebec City, Quebec, Canada		
12	1948 October 27–29	Hotel Sir Walter	Raleigh, NC		
11	1947 September 3–7	Hotel Colorado and State Museum	Glenwood Springs and Denver, CO		
10	1946 October 24–26	National Archives	Washington, DC		
9	1945 November 6–8	Hotel Severin	Indianapolis, IN		
8	1944 November 8–11	Penn Harris Hotel	Harrisburg, PA		
7	1943 November 15–16	Nassau Tavern	Princeton, NJ		
6	1942 October 26–27	Hotel John Marshall	Richmond, VA		
5	1941 October 6–7	Hotel Bond	Hartford, CT		
4	1940 November 11–12	Jefferson Davis Hotel	Montgomery, AL		
3	1939 October 13–14	Carvel Hall Hotel	Annapolis, MD		
2	1938 October 24–26	Abraham Lincoln Hotel	Springfield, IL		
1	1937 June 18–19	National Archives	Washington, DC		
