= Archival science =

Science of storage, registration and preservation of historical data

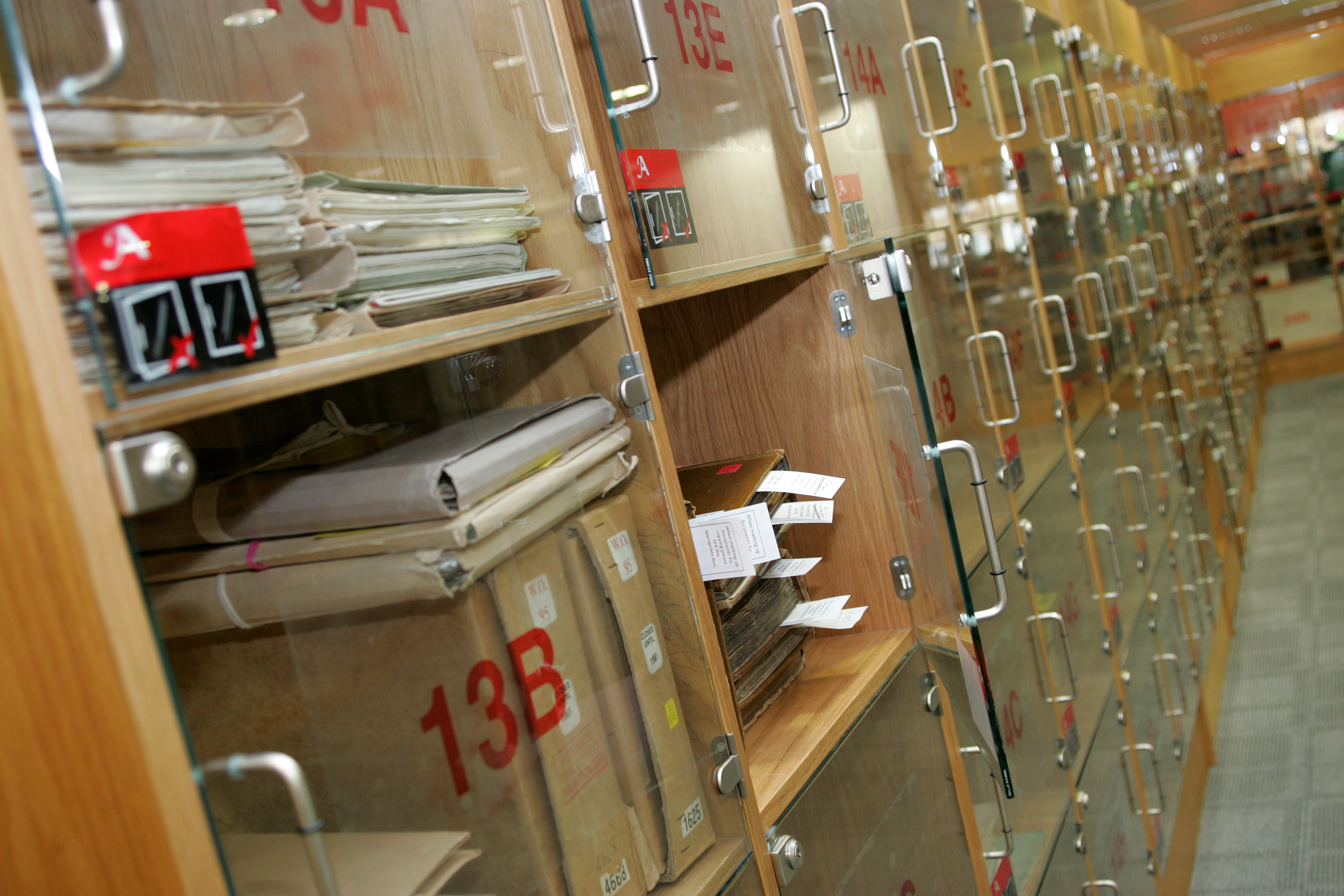
Various documents curated for readers at the National Archives, UK

Archival science, or archival studies, is the study and theory of building and curating archives, which are collections of documents, recordings, photographs and various other materials in physical or digital formats.

To build and curate an archive, one must acquire and evaluate the materials, and be able to access them later. To this end, archival science seeks to improve methods for appraising, storing, preserving, and processing (arranging and describing) collections of materials.

An archival record preserves data that is not intended to change. In order to be of value to society, archives must be trustworthy. Therefore, an archivist has a responsibility to authenticate archival materials, such as historical documents, and to ensure their reliability, integrity, and usability. Archival records must be what they claim to be; accurately represent the activity they were created for; present a coherent picture through an array of content; and be in usable condition in an accessible location.

An archive curator is called an archivist; the curation of an archive is called archive administration.

== History ==
The earliest archival manuals: Jacob von Rammingen, Von der Registratur (1571), and Baldassarre Bonifacio, De Archivis (1632)

Archival science emerged from diplomatics, the critical analysis of documents. Archival science is also closely related to historical archaeography, an interdisciplinary field that analyses various, mutually correlated aspects and properties of ancient manuscripts and early printed materials, and thus prepares and produces scholarly descriptions and editions. (Note: In Eastern Europe, archaeographical studies are conducted by specialized institutions, such as, for example, the former Archaeographic Commission, and modern Institute of Ukrainian Archeography of the National Academy of Sciences of Ukraine.)

In 1540, Jacob von Rammingen (1510–1582) wrote the manuscript of the earliest known archival manual. He was an expert on registries (Registraturen), the German word for what later became known as archives.

Rammingen elaborated a registry for the Augsburg city council. However, since he could not attend the council meeting, he described the structure and management of the archives in writing. Although this is not the first work about archival science (Rammingen himself refers to earlier literature about record-keeping), earlier manuals were usually not published. Archival science had no formal beginning. Jacob von Rammingen's manual was printed in Heidelberg in 1571.

Traditionally, archival science has involved the study of methods for preserving items in climate-controlled storage facilities. It is also the study of cataloguing and accession, of retrieval and safe handling. The advent of digital documents along with the development of electronic databases has caused the field to re-evaluate its means and ends. While generally associated with museums and libraries, the field also can pertain to individuals who maintain private collections or business archives. Archival Science is taught in colleges and universities, usually under the umbrella of Information Science or paired with a History program.

A list of foundational thinkers in archival studies could include: American archivist Theodore Schellenberg and British archivist Sir Hilary Jenkinson. Some important archival thinkers of the past century include: Canadian archivist and scholar Terry Cook, South African archivist Verne Harris, Australian archival scholar Sue McKemmish, UCLA faculty and archival scholar Anne Gilliland, University of Michigan faculty and archival scholar Margaret Hedstrom, American archival scholar and University of Pittsburgh faculty member Richard Cox, Italian archival scholar and faculty at University of British Columbia Luciana Duranti, and American museum and archival scholar David Bearman.

== Standards ==
There is no universal set of laws or standards that governs the form or mission of archival institutions. The forms, functions, and mandates of archival programs and institutions tend to differ based on geographical location and language, the nature of the society in which they exist and the objectives of those in control of the archives. Instead, the current standards that have been provided and are most widely followed, such as the ICA standard, ISO standard, and DIRKS standard, act as working guidelines for archives to follow and adapt in ways that would best suit their respective needs.

Following the introduction of computer technology in archival repositories, beginning in the 1970s, archivists increasingly recognized the need to develop common standards for descriptive practice, in order to facilitate the dissemination of archival descriptive information. The standard developed by archivists in Canada, Rules for Archival Description, also known as RAD, was first published in 1990. As a standard, RAD aims to provide archivists with a consistent and common foundation for the description of archival material within a fonds, based on traditional archival principles. A comparable standard used in the United States is Describing Archives: A Content Standard, also known as DACS. These standards are in place to provide archivists with the tools for describing and making accessible archival material to the public.

Metadata comprises contextual data pertaining to a record or aggregate of records. In order to compile metadata consistently, so as to enhance the discoverability of archival materials for users, as well as support the care and preservation of the materials by the archival institution, archivists look to standards appropriate to various kinds of metadata for different purposes, including administration, description, preservation, and digital storage and retrieval. For example, common standards used by archivists for structuring descriptive metadata, which conveys information such as the form, extent, and content of archival materials, include Machine-Readable Cataloguing (MARC format), Encoded Archival Description (EAD), and Dublin core.

== Provenance in archival science ==
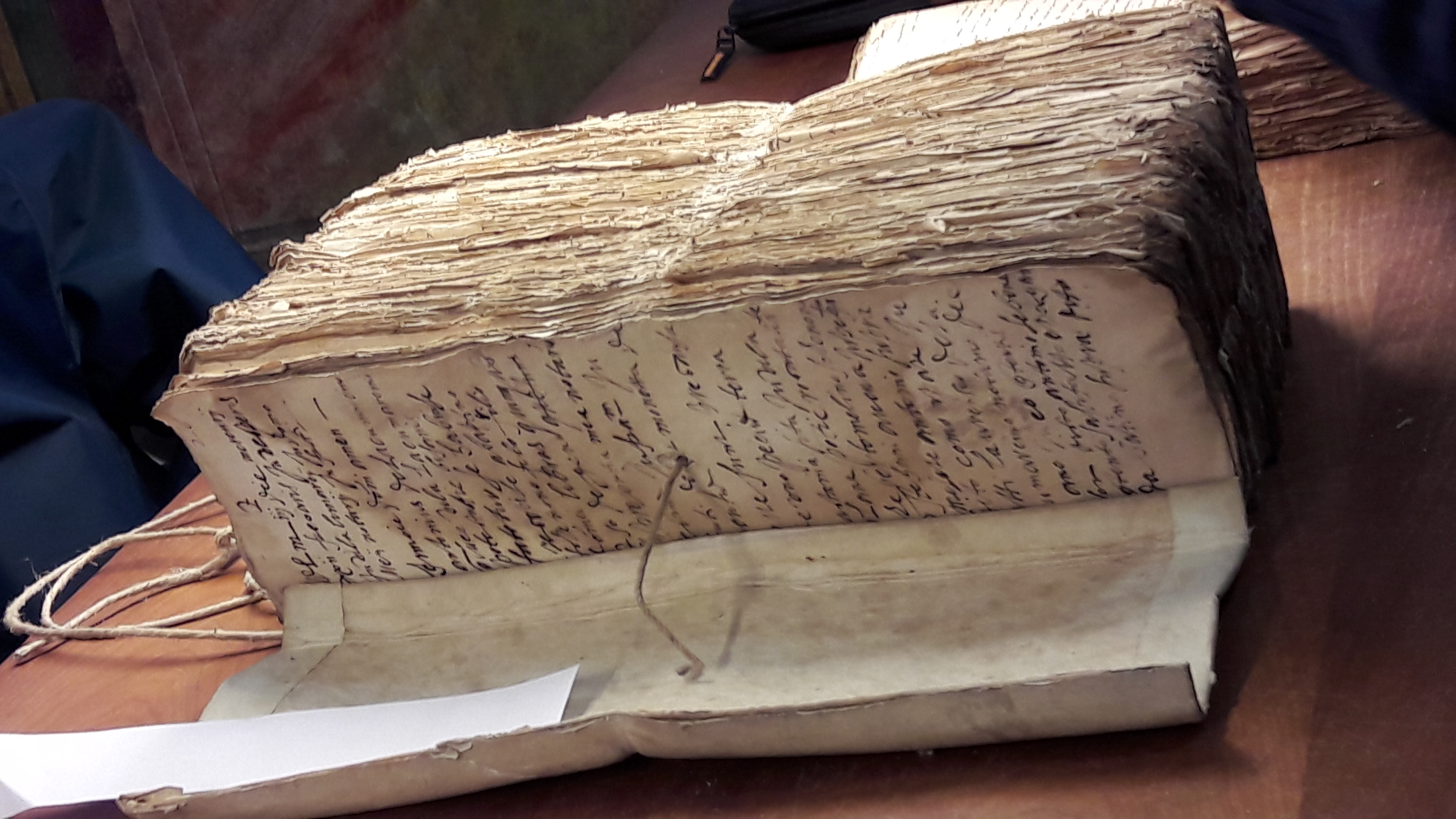
File of documents, year 1542

Provenance in archival science refers to the "origin or source of something; information regarding the origins, custody, and ownership of an item or collection". As a fundamental principle of archives, provenance refers to the individual, family, or organization that created or received the items in a collection. In practice, provenance dictates that records of different origins should be kept separate to preserve their context. As a methodology, provenance becomes a means of describing records at the series level.

=== The principle of provenance ===
Records to be catalogued in archive processing room

Describing records at the series level to ensure that records of different origins are kept separate, provided an alternative to item-level manuscript cataloguing. The practice of provenance has two major concepts: "respect des fonds", and "original order". "Respect des fonds" rose from the conviction that records entering an archive have an essential connection to the person or office that generated and used them; archivists consider all the records originating with a particular administrative unit (whether former, or still existing) to be a separate archival grouping, or "fonds", and seek to preserve and describe the records accordingly, with close attention to evidence of how they were organized and maintained at the time they were created. "Original order", refers to keeping records "as nearly as possible in the same order of classification as obtained in the offices of origin", gives additional credibility to preserved records and to their originating "fonds". Records must be kept in the same order they were placed in the course of the official activity of the agency concerned; records are not to be artificially reorganized. Records kept in their original order are more likely to reveal the nature of the organizations which created them, and more importantly, of the order of activities out of which they emerged.

Not infrequently, practical considerations of storage mean that it is impossible to maintain the original order of records physically. In such cases, however, the original order should still be respected intellectually in the structure and arrangement of finding aids.

=== Practices before the emergence of provenance ===
Following the French Revolution, a newfound appreciation for historical records emerged in French society. Records began to "acquir[e] the dignity of national monuments", and their care was entrusted to scholars who were trained in libraries. The emphasis was on historical research, and it seemed obvious at the time that records should be arranged and catalogued in a manner that would "facilitate every kind of scholarly use". To support research, artificial systematic collections, often arranged by topic, were established and records were catalogued into these schemes. With archival documents approached from a librarianship perspective, records were organized according to classification schemes and their original context of creation were frequently lost or obscured. This form of archival arrangement has come to be known as the "historical manuscripts tradition".

=== Emergence of provenance ===
The principle of "respect des fonds" and of "original order" was adopted in Belgium and France about 1840 and spread throughout Europe during the following decades. Following the rise of state-run archives in France and Prussia, the increasing volume of modern records entering the archive made adherence to the manuscript tradition impossible; there were not enough resources to organize and classify each record. Provenance received its most pointed expression in the "Manual for the Arrangement and Description of Archives", a Dutch text published in 1898 and written by three Dutch archivists, Samuel Muller, Johan Feith, and Robert Fruin. This text provided the first description of the principle of provenance and argued that "original order" is an essential trait of archival arrangement and description.

Complementing the work of the Dutch archivists and supporting the concept of provenance were the historians of the era. Through subject-based classification aided research, historians began to concern themselves with objectivity in their source material. For its advocates, provenance provided an objective alternative to the generally subjective classification schemes borrowed from librarianship. Historians increasingly felt that records should be maintained in their original order to better reflect the activity out of which they emerged.

=== Debates ===
Although original order is a generally accepted principle, there has been some debate about applicability to personal archiving. Original order is not always ideal for personal archives. However, some archivists insist that personal records are created and maintained for much the same reason as organizational archives and should follow the same principles.

== Preservation in archival science ==
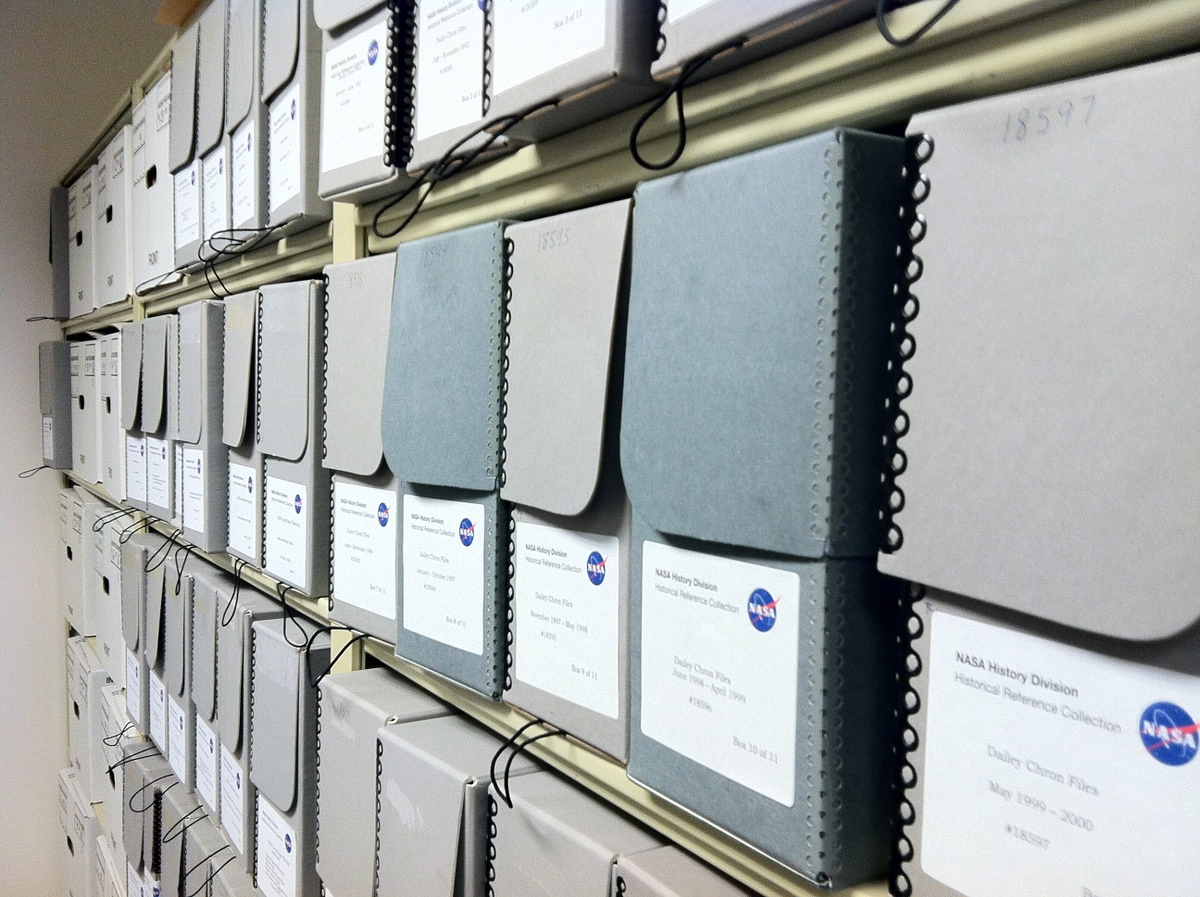
Archival boxes at the NASA archives

Preservation, as defined by the Society of American Archivists (SAA), is the act of protecting materials from physical deterioration or loss of information, ideally in a noninvasive way. The goal of preservation is to maintain as much originality as possible while retaining all the information which the material has to offer. Both scientific principles and professional practices are applied to this technique to be maximally effective. In an archival sense, preservation refers to the care of all the aggregates within a collection. Conservation can be included in this practice and often these two definitions overlap.

=== The beginnings of preservation ===
Preservation emerged with the establishment of the first central archives. In 1789, during the French Revolution, the Archives Nationales was established and later, in 1794, transformed into a central archive. This was the first independent national archive and its goal was to preserve and store documents and records as they were. This trend gained popularity and soon other countries began establishing national archives for the same reasons, to maintain and preserve their records as they were created and received.

Cultural and scientific change reinforced the concept and practice of preservation. In the late eighteenth century, many museums, national libraries, and national archives were established in Europe; therefore ensuring the preservation of their cultural heritage.

=== Archival preservation ===
Preservation, like provenance, is concerned with the proper representation of archival materials. Archivists are primarily concerned with maintaining the record, along with the context in which it was produced, and making this information accessible to the user.

Tout ensemble is a definition relating to preservation. This definition encompasses the idea of context and the importance of maintaining context. When a record is removed from its fellow records, it loses its meaning. In order to preserve a record it must be preserved in its original entirety or else it may lose its significance. This definition relates to the principle of provenance and respect des fonds as it similarly emphasizes the idea of the original record.

Metadata is key for the preservation of context within archival science. Metadata, as defined by the SAA, is "data about data". This data can help archivists locate a specific record, or a variety of records within a certain category. By assigning appropriate metadata to records or record aggregates, the archivist successfully preserves the entirety of the record and the context in which it was created. This allows for better accessibility and improves authenticity.

Physical maintenance is another key feature of preservation. There are many strategies to preserve archives properly: rehousing items in acid-free containers, storing items in climate controlled areas, and copying deteriorating items.

=== Digital preservation ===
Digital preservation involves the implementation of policies, strategies, and actions in order to ensure that digitized documents remain accurate and accessible over time. Due to newly emerging technologies, archives began to expand and require new forms of preservation. Archival collections expanded to include new media such as microfilm, audiofiles, visualfiles, moving images, and digital documents. Many of these new types of media have a shorter life expectancy than paper. Migration from older non-paper formats to newer non-paper formats is necessary for the preservation of digital media so they can remain accessible.

Metadata is an important part of digital preservation as it preserves the context, usage, and migration of a digital record. Similarly to traditional preservation, metadata is required to preserve the authenticity and accessibility of a record.

=== Information access ===
Preserved materials in digital archives can be accessed usually by specifying their metadata, or by content-based search such as full text search when using dedicated information retrieval approaches. These usually return results ranked in terms of their relevance to user queries. Novel retrieval methods for document archives can use other ranking factors such as contemporary relevance and temporal analogy.

== Critical archival studies ==
In 2002, the journal Archival Science published a series of articles that analyzed systems of power in archival practice, theory, and recordkeeping. This approach was described in 2017 by Punzalan, Caswell, and Sangwand as "critical archival studies". Critical archival studies applies critical theory to archival science, with the goal of developing and implementing archival practices that are more fully inclusive of matters pertaining to race, class, gender, sexuality, and ability. For example, it includes documentation of racist acts and references past omissions of such. There are synergies between critical archival studies and digital humanities, to work to resist oppression.

Archival studies have focused renewed concern on recognition and representation of indigenous, community, and human rights archives. Archival practice is increasingly alert to colonial and imperialist implications. Since 2016, the concept of "symbolic annihilation" has been used to describe the disappearance of communities through systematic or implicit lack of representation or under-representation in archives. It was initially adapted into the archival literature by Caswell from feminist uses of symbolic annihilation. This absence can also be found in archival policies as well as description and annotation practices. Preservation and usage of accurate language and descriptions of community archives ensures that community values are not neglected, and contributes to critical archival discussions regarding omissions in historical documentation.

Hughes-Watkins has demonstrated that mainstream archival institutions tend to preserve homogeneous, Eurocentric content within archival practice, with a significant lack of attention to other, diverse perspectives.

== Professional and advanced education ==
In 2002, the Society of American Archivists published guidelines for a graduate program in archival studies. The guidelines were most recently revised and re-approved in 2016.

Formal courses of study in archival science are available at the master's and doctoral level. A master's degree is typically a two-year professional program focusing on acquiring a knowledge base of archival skills (including digital records and access systems) whereas a doctorate is more broad in scope and includes critical inquiry of its archival practices, with graduates typically preparing for careers in research and teaching. Archival science students may have academic backgrounds in areas such as anthropology, economics, history, law, library science, museum studies or information science.

== Associations ==
=== Professional ===
Professional archivist associations seek to foster study and professional development:

- Archives and Records Association (UK and Ireland)
- Archives and Records Association, Ireland
- Association of Moving Image Archivists
- Association of Records Managers and Administrators
- Association of Canadian Archivists
- International Association of Sound and Audiovisual Archives
- International Council on Archives
- Society of American Archivists

=== Regional ===
Smaller professional regional associations provide more local professional development. Examples in the United States include the New England Archivists, Society of Rocky Mountain Archivists, Society of Ohio Archivists, Society of North Carolina Archivists, and Mid-Atlantic Regional Archives Conference.

== See also ==
- Archival appraisal – Process of examining a body of records to determine its value for an archival library
- Archival processing – Surveying, arranging, preserving collections
- Archival bond
- Digital artifactual value – Intrinsic value of a digital object
- Encoded Archival Description – Standard for encoding archival record information
- Finding aid – Organization tool for archives
- Library science – Branch of academic disciplines
- Manuscript processing – Surveying, arranging, preserving collections
- Preservation (library and archival science) – Set of activities aimed at prolonging the life of a record or object
  - Media preservation – Preservation of media
- Provenance – Chronology of the ownership, custody or location of a historical object
- Records management – Management of the information and records of an organization
- List of archives

== Sources ==
- Kennedy-Grimsted, Patricia, ed. (2015) [2000]. Archives in Russia: A Directory and Bibliographic Guide to Holdings in Moscow and St. Petersburg. New York: Routledge.
