= Fonds =

Aggregation of works that originate from the same source

In archival science, a fonds (plural also fonds) is a group of documents that share the same origin and have occurred naturally as an outgrowth of the daily workings of an agency, individual, or organization. An example of a fonds could be the writings of a poet that were never published, or the records of an institution during a specific period.

Fonds are a part of a hierarchical level of description system in an archive that begins with fonds at the top. Subsequent levels become more descriptive and narrower as one goes down the hierarchy. The level descriptions go from fonds to series to file and then item level. Between the fonds and series level there is sometimes a sub-fonds (French: sous-fonds) level, and between the series and file level there is sometimes a sub-series level.

== Historical origins ==
In the archival science field, it is widely agreed upon that the term fonds originated in French archival practice shortly after the French Revolution as Natalis de Wailly, head of the Administrative Section of the Archives Nationales of France, wrote Circular No. 14, which laid out the idea of fonds as keeping records of the same origin together because prior to this announcement records were classified arbitrarily and inconsistently. In the same publication, Wailly also coined the idea of respect des fonds, a principle of original order under which archivists should leave the arrangement of documents within a fonds as originated by the person or agency who created the records. However, Luciana Duranti has found evidence of the idea originating in Naples and other places prior to Circular No. 14 in 1814. Regardless of origin, respect des fonds spread rapidly across Europe after the publication of the Manual for the Arrangement and Description of Archives, which is commonly referred to as the Dutch Manual, in 1898, and the First International Congress of Archivists in 1910.

=== Fonds and provenance ===
The term fonds as created by Wailly was not as precise as it could have been and left a lot of room for interpretation of fonds. Due to this, Prussian archivists issued regulations for the arrangement of archives in 1881. These regulations provided a clearer image of fonds as public records that "should be grouped according to their origins in public administrative bodies", and this principle was termed Provenienzprinzip, or, as it is more commonly known as today among the English-speaking world, provenance. Provenance, in this sense, is the practice by archivists of keeping a group of records obtained as a unit in itself and not merging it with other documents. Provenance also is sometimes referred to as custodial history as it takes in account the different people or organizations that held these records prior to the archive obtaining them and the way they organized them. Respect des fonds is often confused as being the same as provenance, but the two ideas, although closely related, are distinct in that provenance refers to maintaining works by specific people or organizations as separate from others, while respect des fonds adds to this by also maintaining or recreating the original order of the creator. The ideas of fonds and respect des fonds transformed the archival world, and are still in use today.

== Modern-day usage and practices ==
In modern archival practice, the idea of fonds still exists today, principally in Europe and North America. However, the fonds is sometimes changed slightly to suit other archival practices. For example, in the British National Archives, the term archive group is used instead of fonds, while in the United States National Archives and Records Administration the term record group is preferred. Record groups are often compared to fonds, but in actuality they can be composed of more than one fonds or not even a full fonds. In Australian archival theory, there is recognition of the principle of respect des fonds, but the theory focuses on series as the primary descriptive level, with the existence of multiple provenances. Fonds should not be confused with the term document collection, which is used for document aggregations assembled based on some shared characteristic by a collector, but it is not created by the collector and it often does not follow provenance.

=== Fonds in digital archives ===
As archives are increasingly being digitized (scanned and stored on a computer) and moved to an electronic platform, the idea of a fonds existing in an online database is shifting. An electronic catalog does not sort its items in the fonds level of description to follow provenance procedures unless told to do so, and it does not automatically sort the items within a chronological order to follow respect des fonds practices either. There is also the issue of items that are born digital, which are items that have been created electronically and are not automatically subject to the hierarchy of a physical item. The practice of implementing fonds in an electronic database presents new challenges in keeping a fonds together electronically as well as physically. As Jefferson Bailey puts it, "the database logic is nonlinear and there is no original order because order is dependent upon query." In the digital context, some archives have taken to describing their holdings on a fonds or series level, or if an archive chooses to do a file and item level description, the fonds can be kept together by implementing metadata and ensuring that the metadata has information on the relationships between items to link together the item and its higher level descriptions. Fonds in a digital archive is an issue that will continue to evolve as digital archives continue to evolve, and it remains to be seen how fonds will evolve in this context.

== See also ==
- Archival processing
- Finding aid
- Preservation (library and archive)
- Records management
