= Marika Cifor =

American archivist and academic

Marika Cifor is an American archivist and feminist academic known for her work in archival science, library science, and digital studies. She is an associate professor at the University of Washington Information School.

== Career ==
Cifor teaches courses related to archival theory and practice and gender, race, and technology with a focus on social justice and community archives. She is a founder and core faculty member of the school's AfterLab and an affiliate of its Technology and Social Change Group and DataLab. In addition, Cifor serves on the editorial boards of Australian Feminist Studies and the Homosaurus Linked Data Vocabulary.

Cifor's 2022 book Viral Cultures: Activist Archiving in the Age of AIDS examined the archives and legacy of HIV/AIDS activism. Viral Cultures was named one of nine books by which to better understand health, illness, and viruses in a June 2022 article in The Atlantic by Joseph Osmundson.

== Select publications ==
- Cifor, Marika (2022), Viral Cultures: Activist Archiving in the Age of AIDS, University of Minnesota Press, ISBN 9781517909369
- Cifor, Marika (2016). "Affecting relations: introducing affect theory to archival discourse". Archival Science. 16: 7–31. doi:10.1007/s10502-015-9261-5. S2CID 254265173.
- Caswell, Michelle; Cifor, Marika; Ramirez, Mario H. (June 1, 2016). ""To Suddenly Discover Yourself Existing": Uncovering the Impact of Community Archives". The American Archivist. 79 (1): 56–81. doi:10.17723/0360-9081.79.1.56. ISSN 0360-9081.
- Caswell, Michelle; Cifor, Marika (2016). "From Human Rights to Feminist Ethics: Radical Empathy in the Archives". Archivaria. 81 (Spring 2016): 23–43.
