= Ricardo Punzalan =

Filipino-American archivist and researcher

Ricardo L. Punzalan
- Known for: Archival studies, museum studies, virtual reunification, decolonial studies
- Awards: Hugh A. Taylor Prize (2012), Oliver Wendell Holmes Travel Award (2009), Fellow of the Society of American Archivists (2023)

Academic background
- Education: University of Michigan, University of the Philippines
- Alma mater: University of the Philippines
- Doctoral advisor: Margaret Hedstrom

Academic work
- Discipline: archives
- Institutions: University of Michigan School of Information, University of Maryland College of Information Studies, University of the Philippines School of Library and Information Studies
- Website: https://rpunzalan.com

Ricardo L. Punzalan is a Filipino American archivist who is an associate professor of information at the University of Michigan School of Information. He has shaped the fields of archival science, virtual reunification, repatriation, reparative description, and has studied the nature of collections in both museums and archives. He holds undergraduate and master's degrees from the University of the Philippines and a doctorate in information science from the University of Michigan.

== Career ==
Punzalan began a career in archives and museums following his studies at the University of the Philippines. After undergraduate studies at the University of the Philippines, he served as the archivist of the Jorge B. Vargas Museum and Filipiniana Research Center. This work served as partial basis for Punzalan's 2005 Masters thesis, which discussed the context of museum archives and used the Vargas Museum as a case study. Following graduation, Punzalan taught at the University of the Philippines School of Library and Information Studies. He later served as an archivist processing records of the Culion Leprosarium, a U.S. colonial institution for the segregation of individuals with Hansen's disease. Punzalan was also recognized as a historian of archives in the Philippines, where he published about the legacy of three centuries of Spanish colonization on the Philippine National Archives.

== Academic career ==
Since 2013, Punzalan has been active as an academic in archival studies, decolonisation, and critical studies of archives. Punzalan completed a doctorate in information science at the University of Michigan where his advisor was Margaret Hedstrom, who supervised his doctoral dissertation, "Virtual Reunification: Bits and Pieces Gathered Together to Represent the Whole." This doctoral research was a basis for ongoing work in "virtual reunification," which investigated the possibility of reunifying dispersed collections, such as those purchased, collected, or forcibly removed from the Philippines during the American colonial period. Punzalan was invited to present on virtual reunification at the Library of Congress in 2016. He further explored the concept of "archival diasporas" through a study of the dispersal of anthropological and ethnographic photographs by Dean C. Worcester, a U.S. Colonial Administrator and academic.

Punzalan's academic work has also contributed to cultural heritage policy and digital studies. From 2013 to 2019, he was an assistant professor at the University of Maryland College of Information Studies. Since 2020, he has served as an associate professor at the University of Michigan, where he teaches courses in archives, archival appraisal, scholarly communications, and museum studies. At Michigan, he also founded a project to research and repair the university's colonial legacies, including the collection and dispossession of information, ethnographic materials, natural history specimens, and photographs from the Philippines during the U.S. colonial period. Punzalan was recognized in 2021 by Positively Filipino in their list of "Remarkable and Famous" Filipino-Americans.

In 2021, Dr. Punzalan was contracted as an expert evaluator for the Council on Library and Information Resources Digitizing Hidden Collections grant program.

Punzalan has been a leader in the archival field in the United States as well as internationally. Internationally, he has held a longtime position in the International Council on Archives. In the United States, he has served in Society of American Archivists (SAA). He served as an elected member of the SAA Council, the society's highest elected body, from 2018 to 2021. He has also served as the Education Committee Chair of the SAA Visual Materials Section from 2013 to 2016, on the steering committee and later as chair of the Native American Archives Section (2015-2017), and in 2022, he was nominated to run for President of the SAA. In 2022, Punzalan was appointed by the Librarian of Congress as a trustee of the American Folklife Center in recognition of his leadership in the field of community archives and international work to "create dialogues between communities and cultural institutions." In 2023, the Society of American Archivists (SAA) named Punzalan as a distinguished Fellow of the society, the "highest honor bestowed on individuals by SAA," in recognition of his "diverse experience and his work as both a professional archivist and an educator enables him to look at archival issues in new ways, question theories, posit ideas on how to move forward, and lead collaborators, colleagues, and students to new insights."

== Awards and recognitions ==
- Oliver Wendell Holmes Travel Award (2009)
- Hugh A. Taylor Prize (2012)
- Best Paper Presentation, Archival Education and Research Institute (2016)
- Research Associate of the National Anthropological Archives, Smithsonian Institution (2014-)
- Member of the Great Lakes Research Alliance (GRASAC), since 2020
- Editor-in-Chief, Proceedings of the International Council on Archives Section for Archival Education and Training (ICA-SAE) (since 2014).
- Fellow, Society of American Archivists (2023)
