= Community archives =

Community archives are archives created or accumulated, described, and/or preserved by individuals and community groups who desire to document their cultural heritage based on shared experiences, interests, and/or identities, sometimes without the traditional intervention of formally trained archivists, historians, and librarians. Instead, the engaged community members determine the scope and contents of the community archive, such as queer community archives, often with a focus on a significant shared event, such as the Ferguson unrest (2014). Community archives are created in response to needs defined by the members of a community, who may also exert control over how materials are used.

Although local and regional societies, churches, and museums have collected community records for generations, community archives increased in number and popularity throughout the 1970s and 1980s, which Anne Gilliland and Andrew Flinn believe may be due in part to increased interest in oral history and community representation in response to the emerging anti-war, anti-establishment, civil rights, and student activism movements of the 1960s.

The work of community archives received little recognition from archival scholars until the early 2000s, when several published studies explored the relationships between communities, archives, and collective memory. Library and Information Science scholar Jeannette Bastian’s Owning Memory: How a Caribbean Community Lost Its Archives and Found Its History' discusses the experience of the people of the U.S. Virgin Islands and Virgin Islanders' efforts to rebuild their “house of memory”after losing local control of nearly all governmental documents and records to their historical and current colonial rulers. Bastian's work introduces several key concepts, including the notion of a "community of records" to acknowledge that communities are entities that both create records and whose input is needed to contextualize the records they create.

== Methods ==
Community archives may be developed via participatory or autonomous practices, and can occur in both physical and virtual spaces, including through the digitization of dispersed physical materials. The participatory archives model was defined by Isto Huvila in 2008 to discuss how individuals actively and consciously participate in the creation of shared heritage. Drawing on the idea of participatory culture (as opposed to consumer culture), the participatory collection's focus is to create opportunities for civic engagement and artistic expression, encouraging participants to share information and resources with the community to achieve a common goal. The autonomous archives framework was introduced in 2010 by Shauna Moore and Susan Pell to describe community-based collections that are constituted as intentional social and political acts by and for emerging publics, often enacted by those who have been traditionally excluded from the dominant cultural discourse.

The act of bringing together dispersed records online, also called “virtual reunification,” may encourage a more holistic understating of community history and strengthen community ties. However, communities that cannot support these endeavors on their own but wish to remain autonomous may face added complexity, due to the technological infrastructure required to ensure that collections are developed on a platform that can be supported and maintained over time.

=== Dialogue-based ===
Dialogue-based community archive are a form of community archives that prioritize dialogue, participation, and collective decision-making in the creation and interpretation of archival record-keeping processes. By challenging the practice of treating archives as static repositories managed solely by formal archival institutions, dialogue-based community archives emphasize ongoing interaction between community members, archivists, and researchers across all stages of archival work, including decisions about collection, description, access, and use.

Han situates these practices within a framework that places people at the center of archival work. Community engagement guides the direction of archival activity, starting with the scope of initiatives, through interpretation, and priorities. Preservation remains part of this process and is connected to context and care.

Digital tools frequently support dialogue-based practices by widening access and enabling participation. Their use raises questions about visibility, interaction, and control. Gilliland and Flinn, along with Han, stress the importance of examining how different technologies and platforms influence engagement within specific community settings.

The implementation of Dialogue-based community archives faces distinct organizational challenges. Sustaining long-term engagement has been identified as the primary difficulty, as many projects rely on short-term funding, grant cycles, or volunteer labor. Han also emphasizes that critical community engagement requires attentiveness to power structures, especially when working across differences in cultural backgrounds or institutional affiliation. Dialogue-based community archives are frequently developed within underrepresented communities, including immigrant communities and communities whose histories have been excluded from dominant narratives. Han documents how dialogue-based archival practices support trust building to build a network of intergenerational knowledge sharing.

== Resources ==
There are many toolkits and best practices guidelines published by practitioners working outside of, within, and in partnership with cultural heritage organizations such as libraries, archives and museums. These include Tacoma Public Library’s Community Archives Toolkit, The University of North Carolina's Charting New Courses in Community-Driven Archives, The Community Archiving Workshop Handbook, and The University of Massachusetts Boston's Roadmap for Participatory Archiving

== Challenges ==
In 2021, Shift Collective published its Needs Assessment to Identify Hidden Collections Documenting America’s Diverse Culture and History which identified 7 key findings about the needs of community-based archives, historical societies, public and rural library archives, tribal archives, archives in small museums, and archives in community organizations such as civic and activist groups. These findings include the need for stabilized funding sources, help with collection assessment, analysis of representation of marginalized groups within collections, digital preservation planning and technical assistance, and long-term strategies for sustained development.

As the term "community archive" has gained popularity, it has been applied in a variety of ways, including as a way to denote community participation in knowledge creation and preservation in ways that may challenge existing dominant historical and political narratives. However, the ambiguity inherent in defining the terms "community" and "archives" complicates attempts to discuss and define what is meant by "community archives". Archivists and contributing communities have described their practices in overlapping terms such as "community-based", "independent", or "community-centric" archives. The meaning of these terms shift depending on collection practices, target communities, and institutional alignment.Therefore, allowing these independent entities to label and define their organizations and missions is one important way to support their activities.

Whether community archives consider their endeavors to be political, exerting control over community documentation and storytelling inherently calls attention to issues of power manifest in traditional approaches to archival creation and maintenance. As the interest in, and number of, community archives increase globally, opportunities to document and share these efforts and materials with the general public may result in tension between community archives stakeholders and heritage professionals who are trained with an emphasis on legal, intellectual, and physical control of records.

Since many community archives develop as independent social spaces, often distinct from mainstream narratives, their organizational champions may resist archival labels and/or intervention by trained professionals out of concern that collections may be absorbed by formal institutions and rendered inaccessible to their communities. Therefore, issues of independence and autonomy tend to be at the forefront of community archival identities, even if they seek partnerships or welcome support from traditional cultural heritage institutions.

Beyond spatial and financial limitations, community archives can suffer from a lack of trained staff to handle preservation, curation, and outreach activities. As a result, community archives may still be managed by outside institutions despite heavy involvement with their specific demographic.

Scholars such as Michelle Caswell have proposed addressing these challenges through the development of “citizen archivist” training programs. These initiatives aim to equip community members with practical skills in archival handling, material preservation, and ethical community engagement. The broader goal is to gradually shift authority and expertise away from external, third-party institutions and restore archival autonomy to the communities themselves.
