= Australian Series System =

The Australian Series System is an archival control or metadata system, used primarily to describe records in the custody of archival institutions. It was developed at the Australian Archives and forms the basis for the Australian Society of Archivists' committee on descriptive standards guide ″Describing archives in context″.

In 1966, Peter Scott of the Commonwealth Archives Office (predecessor to the National Archives of Australia) developed the system (in practice, referred to as the Commonwealth Records Series System by the National Archives) in his paper "The Record Group Concept: A Case for Abandonment". This approach represented a change in traditional archival theories of provenance that groups records by the more flexible record series rather than the record group which required all records to be filed under only one creating agency (business, government agency, individual, etc.).

The new system recognises that creating agencies change names, split and dissolve over time and provides a flexible framework to arrange their records across the different agencies which all share the same organizational content. These record series are relational in that they are linked to their historical creating agencies in their various forms to reflect changes in organizational structure over time.

The system is noted for its separation of data about record-keeping and context, by structuring an archive's organisation through individually describing separate "Context entities" for:

- Records (the bunch of documents);
- Agents (the persons or organisations that create and manage the Records); and/or,
- Functional Provenance (the business the Agents do).

In this the traditional Respect des fonds and original order are both incorporated and extended, particularly useful where an original function is maintained by differing agents through time.
