= Michelle Caswell =

American archivist and academic

- Born: Chicago
- Awards: Waldo Gifford Leland Award (2015); Hugh A. Taylor Prize (2020)

Academic background
- Education: Columbia University; Harvard University; University of Wisconsin-Milwaukee; University of Wisconsin-Madison

Academic work
- Institutions: University of California, Los Angeles
- Website: michellecaswell.org

Michelle Caswell is an American archivist and academic known for her work regarding community archives and approaches to archival practice rooted in anti-racism and anti-oppression. She is a professor of archival studies in the Department of Information Studies at University of California, Los Angeles and is the director of the school's Community Archives Lab.

== Career ==
Caswell completed a B.A. in religion at Columbia University and an M.A. in world religions at Harvard University. Pursuing an interest in South Asian culture, she took courses focusing on related communities. In a 2018 interview with the Archives and Records Association, she explained: "I thought that I might be a professor of South Asian studies or religious studies, but coming from a working-class background, I had no guidance or role model to help pick a profession." Following graduation, she worked in marketing and fundraising positions before decided to pursue a career in the information sciences. She obtained an MLIS from the University of Wisconsin-Milwaukee and a PhD at the School of Library and Information Studies at the University of Wisconsin-Madison.

Caswell worked part-time at the University of Chicago as assistant bibliographer for South Asia while taking MLIS courses, where she met Samip Mallick. Together they founded the South Asian American Digital Archive, a post-custodial digital repository for materials related to the South Asian community in the United States, in 2008.

Following her PhD studies, Caswell was hired by department of information studies at the University of California, Los Angeles. An associate professor of archival studies, she teaches courses related to archival theory and practice with a focus on social justice, human rights, and community archives. She is also the director of the UCLA Community Archives Lab. As part of a course assignment she and a group of students developed a visual resource for dismantling white supremacy in archives. Courtney Dean, Head of the Center for Primary Research and Training at UCLA, referred to Caswell's work in this area as "sea change in the profession."

Caswell's 2014 book, Archiving the Unspeakable: Silence, Memory, and the Photographic Record in Cambodia examined the legacy of the Khmer Rouge. It was awarded the Society of American Archivists' Waldo Gifford Leland Award in 2015 with the review committee noting it "succeeds in its mission to 'challenge archivists to embrace their own power to counter the silences embedded in records, particularly records that document human rights abuse'." In 2017, she was awarded the SAA's Fellows' Ernst Posner Award, with co-authors Marika Cifor and Mario H. Ramirez, for their article "To Suddenly Discover Yourself Existing: Uncovering the Impact of Community Archives". Caswell's contributions to the profession have also been recognized by the Association of Canadian Archivists. She and co-authors Gracen Brilmyer, Joyce Gabiola and Jimmy Zavala, were awarded the 2020 Hugh A. Taylor Prize for their article "Reciprocal Archival Imaginaries: The Shifting Boundaries of "Community" in Community Archives". She also gave the plenary address at the 2020 ACA conference.

== Select publications ==
- Caswell, Michelle (2021), Urgent Archives: Enacting Liberatory Memory Work, Routledge (published 31 May 2021), ISBN 9780367427276
- Caswell, Michelle; Cifor, Marika; Ramirez, Mario H. (1 June 2016). ""To Suddenly Discover Yourself Existing": Uncovering the Impact of Community Archives". The American Archivist. 79 (1): 56–81. doi:10.17723/0360-9081.79.1.56. ISSN 0360-9081.
- Caswell, Michelle (2020). "Dusting for Fingerprints: Introducing Feminist Standpoint Appraisal". Journal of Critical Library and Information Studies. 3.
- Brilmyer, Gracen; Gabiola, Joyce; Zavala, Jimmy; Caswell, Michelle (14 November 2019). "Reciprocal Archival Imaginaries: The Shifting Boundaries of "Community" in Community Archives". Archivaria. 88 (Fall 2019): 6–48. ISSN 1923-6409.
