= State Records of South Australia =

South Australian public archive

State Records of South Australia (SRSA) is the archives and records management authority for the Government of South Australia. It is responsible for storing, managing, protecting and providing access to the official records of the South Australian Government, as well as providing South Australian state and local government agencies with advice about records management, freedom of information and information privacy. State Records was established under the State Records Act 1997.

== Historical background ==
The need for a South Australian government archives was identified earliest by historian Henry Hussey whilst seeking access to government records in 1862 for the purpose of compiling a history of the early days of the colony. In 1915, George Cockburn Henderson put forward a proposal, and in October 1918 the South Australian Parliament granted 700 pounds to the Public Library Board to adapt the former Armoury building on North Terrace, Adelaide, as the Government Store for archives. The archive was officially established in 1919, and on 1 July 1919 the first archivist, George Henry Pitt was appointed. South Australia's State Archives Department was the first state archives in Australia.

In 1925, destruction of South Australian Government records was prohibited without the approval of the Libraries Board of South Australia. The Board was empowered to take records into its custody and recover government documents from the hands of 'unauthorised persons'.

In 1939, the Archives Department was incorporated into the Public Library of South Australia. Although originally established as a department in its own right, effective control of the Archives Department passed to the Public Library of South Australia in 1961. This situation was further consolidated in 1967 when the Archives, which incorporated both public and private records, moved to the basement of the building of what by 1967 was called the State Library of South Australia on North Terrace.

In 1973 the South Australian government adopted, via a Cabinet decision, a general rule of providing access to government records after 30 years.

Another major change occurred on 1 October 1985, when the South Australian Archives separated its government record holdings and private collections. The government archives became the Public Record Office of South Australia (PROSA). The archival records of private individuals, churches, societies and businesses held by the South Australian Archives were combined with published material from the South Australian Collection of the State Library to establish the Mortlock Library of South Australiana.

Progressively from December 1987, the Public Record Office staff and collection left the State Library basement. On 7 July 1987, a purpose-built archival repository at Gepps Cross was officially opened and operated as a shared facility with the Australian Archives (later the National Archives of Australia – the first such arrangement between an Australian state archive and the Commonwealth Government archival agency). The Public Reading Room was operated from the Norwich Centre building, King William Road, North Adelaide from December 1987.

The Public Record Office of South Australia became State Records of South Australia in 1990, following a departmental restructure. Around this time, State Records began administering the Information Privacy Principles and the Freedom of Information Act, 1991.

In 1995, the Norwich Centre Reading Room was closed and a new Public Reading Room was opened at Netley Commercial Park. The National Archives of Australia also began to reduce its holdings at the Gepps Cross Repository and by 1999 only the State Records collection was stored at the Gepps Cross site.

The State Records Act 1997 commenced on 31 October 1997. The Act established the State Records Council who took over responsibility for disposal determinations on Government records from the Libraries Board.

In January 2004, the Netley Reading Room was closed and, after redevelopment of the site, a Research Centre at the Gepps Cross site was opened to the public on 19 April 2004. The Gepps Cross Repository storage capacity was increased to 75000 linear metres. The collection was consolidated at the Gepps Cross Repository, and was barcoded for the first time. The on-line catalogue, ArchivesSearch, was also launched, enabling online searching and ordering functionality.

The City Research Centre, in the heritage listed Bickford North Building in Leigh Street, Adelaide, opened to the public on 26 October 2004. The City Research Centre included public research facilities, training rooms and an exhibition space.

In March 2011 the Adelaide office of National Archives of Australia moved into the building in Leigh Street, with the joint public research facilities becoming known as the South Australian Archives Centre. In December 2011 it was announced that repository space had been secured at the former Australian Archives facility at Collinswood, increasing repository capacity by approximately 30000 linear metres.

In August 2014, State Records of South Australia relocated its Research Centre facilities from Leigh Street and Gepps Cross to the Somerville Reading Room within the State Library of South Australia, as part of a co-location arrangement with the State Library of South Australia and the National Archives of Australia, Adelaide Office. This saw the closure of the South Australian Archives Centre in Leigh Street, Adelaide. In December 2015 records viewing at the Somerville Reading Room was ceased and in January 2016 the State Records Research Centre was re-opened at Gepps Cross.

== Legislative history ==
- The Public Library, Museum and Art Gallery and Institutes Act 1925 prohibited the destruction of South Australian Government records without the approval of the Libraries Board of South Australia. The legislation empowered the Board to take records into its custody and provided for the recovery of government documents in the hands of 'unauthorised persons'. The power to make disposal decisions remained with the Board, or its sub-committees, until the passage of the State Records Act 1997.
- Local Government Act 1934
- Libraries Act 1982
- South Australia's Information Privacy Principles, a Cabinet decision, were introduced in July 1989, and regulate the way South Australian Public Sector agencies collect, use, store and disclose personal information. The role of the Privacy Committee of South Australia is to oversee the application of the IPPs by State Government agencies, reports to the responsible Minister and provide advice on privacy issues. State Records provides executive support to the Privacy Committee.
- Freedom of Information Act 1991 promotes openness and accountability in government and facilitates more effective participation by members of the public in the processes involved in the making and administration of laws and policies. State Records provides support to the Minister responsible for the administration of the FOI Act by providing advice to government and the public.
- State Records Act 1997 has the objectives of establishing the office of State Records for preserving permanent value official records of the Government of South Australia; promoting the observance of recordkeeping best practice in government agencies; ensuring ready access by the public to official records in State Records' custody; and establishing the State Records Council, formalising some of the roles previously held by the Libraries Board.

== Archival arrangement ==
Until 1982 the South Australian Archives used a Record Group system of classification. In 1983 the South Australian Archives (later PROSA, later SRSA) began using the Australian Series System to arrange the records in the collection. Records transferred prior to this change in the system of arrangement retain the historical arrangement and archival reference, i.e. GRG (Government Record Group) or MRG (Municipal Record Group) numbers.
