= Anne J. Gilliland =

Irish-American archivist and academic

Anne Jervois Gilliland (born 1959) is an archivist, scholar, and professor in the field of archival studies. She is currently director of the Center for Information as Evidence at the University of California, Los Angeles Graduate School of Education & Information Studies.

== Education ==
Gilliland grew up in Northern Ireland. She holds an M.A. in English Literature (Old Norse and Anglo-Irish Literature concentrations) from Trinity College Dublin; an M.S. in Library and Information Studies from the University of Illinois at Urbana-Champaign; and a Ph.D. in Information and Library Studies from the University of Michigan.

== Career ==
Since 1995, Gilliland has held various positions within UCLA's Department of Information Studies. She began at UCLA as an assistant professor. She became a full professor in 2005. She served as chair of the department between 2005 and 2009, and became the inaugural associate dean of Information Studies in 2018. She is currently director of the Center for Information as Evidence at the UCLA School of Education and Information Studies.

Along with Michelle Caswell and Marika Cifor, Gilliland is credited with introducing concepts of affect, imagined and impossible records into the field of archival theory, and having significantly influenced the trajectory of the field with this work. She has also collaborated widely with Australian archival scholar Sue McKemmish, particularly on the topics of rights in records, co-creatorship, and Indigenous peoples' claims to their records. Gilliland established the Refugee Rights in Records Initiative.

She was a founding faculty member of the Archival Education and Research Institute (AERI).

== Awards and honors ==
- Harold A. and Lois Haytin Faculty Award from the UCLA Graduate School of Education & Information Studies (2012)
- C.F.W. Coker Award from the Encoded Archival Description Working Group of the Society of American Archivists (1998)
- Margaret Cross Norton Award, from the Midwest Archives Conference (1997)
- Honorary Professorial Research Fellow at the Humanities Advanced Technology and Information Institute of the University of Glasgow, 2002–03
- Fellow of the Society of American Archivists

== Bibliography ==
- Willer, Mirna, Anne J. Gilliland, and Marijana Tomic, eds, Authenticity, Provenance, Authority and Evidence: Selected Papers from the Conference and School on Authenticity, Provenance, Authority and Evidence, University of Zadar, Croatia, October 2016, (Zadar: University of Zadar Press, 2018).
- Gilliland, Anne J., Sue McKemmish and Andrew J Lau, eds. Research in the Archival Multiverse (Social Informatics Monograph Series, Monash University Press, 2016), http://www.publishing.monash.edu/books/ram-9781876924676.html.
- Gilliland, Anne J. Conceptualizing Twenty-first-century Archives (Chicago, IL: Society of American Archivists, 2014).
- Willer, Mirna, Anne J. Gilliland, and Marijana Tomic, eds, Records, Archives and Memory: Selected Papers from the Conference and School on Records, Archives and Memory Studies, University of Zadar, Croatia, May 2013 (Zadar: University of Zadar Press, 2015).
- Gilliland, Anne and Sue McKemmish, eds. Nuevos métjodos de investigación en archivística, Cartagena, Spain: Tendencias monograph series, 2007 (translation of guest edited double issue of Archival Science on Building a Research Infrastructure for Archival Science).
- Gilliland-Swetland, Anne J. Enduring Paradigm, New Opportunities: The Value of the Archival Perspective in the Digital Environment (Washington, D.C.: Council on Library and Information Resources, 2000).
- Gilliland, Anne J. "Setting the Stage." in Introduction to Metadata, edited by Murtha Baca, 3rd ed. (Los Angeles, CA: Getty Publications, 2016).
- Wood, Stacy, Kathy Carbone, Marika Cifor, Anne Gilliland, and Ricardo Punzalan. Mobilizing records: re-framing archival description to support human rights (Archival Science, vol 14, 2014).
