= Colombian College of Archivists =

Professional association of archivists in Colombia

The Colombian College of Archivists or CCA (Spanish: Colegio Colombiano de Archivistas) is a professional association which certifies professional archivists in Colombia.

The Colombian College of Archivists is a private institution officially entrusted with the public function of regulating the profession. The CCA maintains Colombia's National Register of Archivists (Registro Único de Profesionales Archivistas, or RUPA) and issues professional cards to those who complete accredited archival programs.

The Colombian College of Archivists was founded on December 11, 2006. The organization's founding came one year after Colombia's House of Representatives began considering a bill to legally regulate the archivist profession. When the CCA was founded, the archival profession in Colombia was organised in several voluntary organizations, but none with a legal power of regulation. The Sociedad Colombiana de Archivistas (SCA), one of these voluntary organizations, led the introduction of a bill in 2005 to define legal regulations for archivists. Over the next year, the SCA and other archival organizations, including Colombia's information schools, debated revisions to the proposed bill. The Colombian College of Archivists was founded during this discussion period and, once formed, also contributed to public debate around the legal requirements which should govern Colombian archivists.

== See also ==
- Archives in Colombia (in Spanish)
