= University of the Philippines School of Library and Information Studies =

Library school in Quezon City, Philippines

School of Library and Information Studies
- Paaralan ng Aralin sa Aklatan at Impormasyon
- Former names: Institute of Library Science (1961 - 2002); Institute of Library and Information Science (2002 - 2007)
- Type: Degree-granting unit of the University of the Philippines
- Established: 1961
- Affiliations: International Federation of Library Associations and Institutions, iSchools Consortium
- Dean: Asst. Prof. Rhea Rowena U. Apolinario
- College Secretary: Asst. Prof. Mark Anthony A. Santos
- Faculty: 14 full-time, 26 part-time
- Administrative staff: 6 administration, 3 librarians
- Location: Quirino Avenue, UP Diliman, Quezon City; 14°39′09.7″N 121°04′16.2″E
- Colours: Lemon, Maroon, Green
- Website: slis.upd.edu.ph

The School of Library and Information Studies of the University of the Philippines or UP SLIS is the oldest library school in the Philippines. Formally established in March 1961 as the Institute of Library Science, it can trace it roots to 1914, making it one of the first library schools in Asia. It is an independent degree-granting unit of the University of the Philippines Diliman, and offers programs in the field of library and information science.

The Commission on Higher Education declared the school as the first (and, to date, only) Center of Excellence among universities and colleges with library and information programs in the Philippines in December 2015. The school is ranked among the global top 100 in library and information management in the QS World University Rankings in 2025.

== Academics ==
Starting in 1995, the School offered the Bachelor of Library and Information Science. The program aims to prepare students for career opportunities in professional librarianship, publishing and book trade, and information-related business, replacing the Bachelor of Library Science program. A new curriculum introduced in 2002 integrated the University's Revised General Education Program and offered several specialization tracks, including archives and records management, health and medical librarianship, information systems, and law librarianship. Since then, the program has been updated to align with the University's General Education program. Starting 1962, the then Institute offered the Master of Library Science program, the first in the country, and has since been updated to Master of Library and Information Science. In 2022, it also commenced offering its Master of Archives and Records Management.

=== Degree programs ===
- Bachelor of Library and Information Science (AUN-QA Assessed Programme, Aug 2025)
- Master of Library and Information Science
  BLIS and MLIS specialization tracks:
  - Information Systems and Technology
  - Archives and Records Management
  - Medical Librarianship
  - Law Librarianship
  - General Librarianship
- Master of Science in Library and Information Science
- Master in Archives and Records Management
- Diploma in Librarianship
  Diploma program concentration areas:
  - Medical Sciences Librarianship
  - Law Librarianship

== History ==
The school can trace its roots back to 1914, thirty years after Melvil Dewey established the pioneering School of Library Economy in Columbia College. Library courses were offered in the College of Liberal Arts under James Alexander Robertson, UP's first library science professor. This made the University the first library school in the Philippines and one of the first in Asia. The first full library studies program was offered two years later, in 1916.

In March 1961, the Institute of Library Science was formally established, and a year later, the institute established its graduate program. From 1978 to 1984, the Institute was selected by UNESCO as the host institution for the Postgraduate Training Course for Science Information Specialists in Southeast Asia. In 2002, the Institute was renamed "Institute of Library and Information Science" in order to keep up with the nomenclature for the field. This required the institute to set up the first IT Applications Lab and Computer Lab for a library school in the Philippines. On March 27, 2007, the Board of Regents approved the Institute's petition to elevate it to the "School of Library and Information Studies." Coinciding with the APEC and Related Summits in the Philippines, the School hosted the Asia-Pacific Library and Information Education and Practice conference in October 2015.

Graduates from the School consistently top and register the highest passing rates in the Licensure Examination for Librarians. From 2014 up to the present, UP SLIS has been achieving a 100% passing rate in the said examinations. The School was the first in the University to rank in the 51-100 band in the global QS World University Rankings by subject. It was one of the only two schools in the Philippines in 2025 to place in the Top 100.

UP SLIS Performance in the Librarian Licensure Examination, 2005-present

Examination Date	UP SLIS Passing Rate (Passed/Total Examinees)	National Passing Rate (Passed/Total Examinees)
November 2005	93.00% (43/46)	31.50% (240/762)
November 2006	95.00% (37/39)	36.73% (303/825)
November 2007	98.00% (47/48)	32.03% (278/868)
November 2008	85.00% (34/40)	23.63% (237/1,003)
November 2009	95.56% (43/45)	29.99% (284/947)
November 2010	97.50% (39/40)	27.32% (191/699)
November 2011	94.29% (33/35)	27.62% (211/764)
November 2012	100% (27/27)	46.67% (379/812)
November 2013	97.3% (36/37)	45.80% (382/834)
April 2014	100% (8/8)	27.95% (149/533)
April 2015	100% (25/25)	47.04% (349/742)
September 2016	100% (50/50)	64.74% (738/1,140)
September 2017	100% (27/27)	60.29% (545/904)
September 2018	100% (26/26)	49.00% (466/951)
September 2019	100% (36/36)	55.18% (565/1,024)
September 2021	100% (10/10)	47.68% (113/237)
September 2022	100% (12/12)	39.43% (250/634)
September 2023	100% (21/21)	62.64% (555/886)
September 2024 CBLE	100% (6/6)	48.77% (376/771)
September 2025 CBLE	100% (13/13)	68.52% (629/919)
September 2026 CBLE	96.43% (27/28)	74.95% (760/1,014)

=== Heads ===
Heads of the UP School of Library and Information Studies

Head	Designation	Tenure
Consuelo Damaso	Acting Director	1961-1964
Grace Fabella Bulaong	Officer in Charge	1964-1965
Mae Furbeyre	Officer in Charge	1965-1967
Ruby Kelly-Mangahas	Director	1967-1969
Clarisa Dimalanta	Director	1969-1970
Ursula Picache	Director	1970-1984
Rosa Vallejo	Dean	1984-1994
Herminia Santos	Dean	1994-1997
Josephine Sison	Dean	1997-2003
Maria Divina Pascua-Cruz	Dean	2003-2005
Rosalie Faderon	Dean	2005-2008
Vyva Victoria Aguirre	Dean	2008-2010
Johann Frederick Cabbab	Dean	2010-2014
Kathleen Lourdes Obille	Dean	2014-2020
Mary Grace Golfo-Barcelona	Dean	2020-2023
Rhea Rowena Apolinario	Dean	2023-present

== Faculty of Instruction ==
As of AY 2026-2027, the UP SLIS has 16 full-time faculty members. The School is also supported by 16 part-time lecturers, who are recognized experts in LIS professional practice.

== Publications ==
The UP SLIS publishes the Philippine Journal of Librarianship and Information Studies (formerly the Journal of Philippine Librarianship), the only academic journal in the area of library and information science in the country. Aside from scholastic and thematic articles, it also publishes abstracts to graduate and undergraduate theses submitted to the school. In 2008, it started limited publication of its print version and has since been made available through the University of the Philippines Diliman Journals Online portal.

The School also publishes the information sheet SLIS Newsletter (available online through the official website) and its library produces guides, updates and current awareness services.

== Student Life ==
The School was formerly situated in Gonzalez Hall, where the University Library is located. Constructed in the 1940s almost simultaneously with the arts and sciences, administration and engineering buildings, the University Library was completed in 1950 and is one of the oldest structures at the Diliman campus and was designed by alumnus and campus architect Juan Nakpil. It was purposely fashioned after the administration building, now known as Quezon Hall. The building was later named Gonzalez Hall, in honor of the former UP President Bienvenido M. Gonzalez. UP SLIS was situated along one corridor located in the South Wing on the 3rd Floor of the building until it vacated the location in 2019. It is currently holding offices and classes at the Bonifacio Hall, which houses the School of Labor and Industrial Relations.

Limited space requirements and dilapidated conditions of the prior location of the School prompted it to launch a building fund to raise funds for the construction or renovation of a building for the transfer of its physical facilities as early as April 2007. The UP SLIS is set to occupy the old Zoology Building, which was formerly used by the Institute of Biology. The structure was chosen due to its proximity to the Main Library, which serves as the laboratory for its students. It remains under renovation.

=== Organizations ===
- UP Archons
- UP Bibliotech
- UP Future Library and Information Professionals of the Philippines
- UP Library and Information Science Students Association
- UP Library Science Alumni Association
- UP School of Library and Information Studies Chorale
- UP School of Library and Information Studies Student Council
