= Sue McKemmish =

Australian archivist

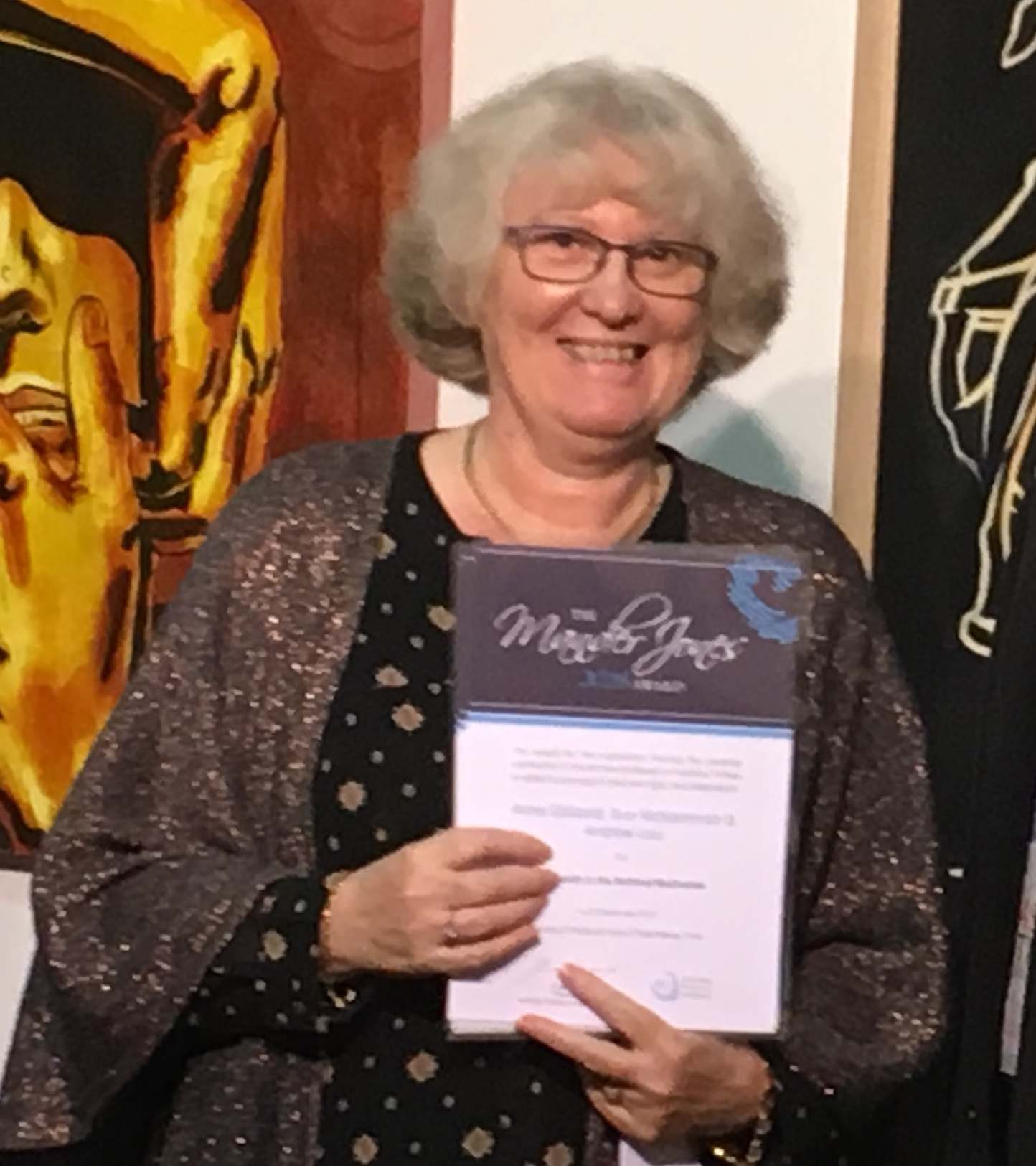
Sue McKemmish accepts award

Professor Sue McKemmish is an Australian archivist and scholar in the field of archival science. She is currently the Associate Dean Graduate Research for the Faculty of Information Technology at Monash University, Melbourne.

== Career ==
McKemmish worked for 15 years for the National Archives of Australia and Public Record Office Victoria. In 1990 she joined Frank Upward at Monash University to develop a curriculum for recordkeeping professionals at undergraduate and post-graduate levels. She is best known in her discipline for her seminal paper "Evidence of me" (1996), about personal recordkeeping and societal memory. She also played a significant role in the development of records continuum thinking which led to Frank Upward's Records Continuum Model. In the 1990s she was a founding member of the Records Continuum Research Group at Monash.

She is a leader of continuum thinking, particularly related to societal memory linked to accountability, and is closely associated with the Australian records continuum movement. She has published extensively on recordkeeping in society, records continuum theory, recordkeeping metadata, and archival systems, and is a Laureate of the Australian Society of Archivists.

She has been at the forefront of a research and education agenda based in continuum thinking, which includes the development and leadership of international, multidisciplinary and collaborative research projects, as well as supervising multiple PhD students. She is engaged in major research and standards initiatives relating to the use of metadata in records and archival systems, information resource discovery and smart information portals, Australian Indigenous archives, and the development of more inclusive archival educational programs that meet the needs of diverse communities.

McKemmish has taken on senior leadership roles in the Faculty of Information Technology at Monash. She is the Chair of Archival Systems, Founder and Director of the Centre for Organisational and Social Informatics (COSI), and Associate Dean Graduate Research of the Faculty of Information Technology.
