= Jeannette Bastian =

American academic

Jeannette Bastian is an archival scholar, academic, author, and a Fellow of the Society of American Archivists. From 1987 to 1998, she was the Territorial Librarian of the U.S. Virgin Islands and has published widely on topics related to colonial archives and decolonial archival practices.

Her books include Owning Memory: How a Caribbean Community Lost Its Archives and Found Its History (2003), Community Archives: The Shaping of Memory (2009), and Decolonizing the Caribbean Record: An Archives Reader (2018).
