= Tecnológico de Antioquia =

Coordinates: 6.2793°N 75.5835°W

- Tecnológico de Antioquia
- Motto: Education without borders
- Type: Public, National
- Established: 1983
- Rector: Leonardo García Botero
- Location: Medellín, Antioquia, Colombia
- Nickname: TdeA
- Website: http://www.tdea.edu.co/

The Tecnológico de Antioquia (TdeA) (English: Antioquia Institute of Technology), also called Tecnológico de Antioquia – University Institute, is an academic institution of higher education in Colombia in the department of Antioquia, provides technical education services, technology and professional. Its headquarters are located in the commune Robledo, in the city of Medellín.

On March 14, 2023, Tecnológico de Antioquia (TdeA) celebrated its 40th anniversary as an institution of higher learning.

== Campus ==
The campus has an area of 38 thousand square meters, which has spacious and comfortable spaces, surrounded by more than 13 thousand square meters of green areas. It has academic, administrative, library, study areas, computer block, laboratories, covered arena, gym, pool, soccer field sports facilities, cafes and parks, among others.

== Faculties ==
The institution has 40 programs, professional technical levels, technological and university professional in undergraduate and graduate, all with qualified registration and one high quality accreditation (preschool), offered through five faculties: education and social sciences, forensic and health, informatics, management, and earth sciences and environment.

== Fulbright ==
The institution has hosted a number of Fulbright Program scholars and visiting professors over the years.
