= Personal archiving =

Branch of archival science and genealogy

Personal archiving is a branch of archival science and genealogy, focusing on the capture and preservation of an individual's personal papers and other documentary output, generally by the individuals concerned. It is often related to family history, when family historians are engaged in capturing their own living history to leave as a legacy for future generations. This branch of family history is allied to the growth in activities such as photograph and record scanning which seeks to preserve materials beyond their original life.

Modern personal archiving is often concerned with digital preservation, especially with collating individual's content from social media websites and ensuring the long-term preservation of this. This often deals with migration of digital content, as a means of preservation, rather than the traditional tasks of conservation of paper-based records.

== Form and motivation ==
Individuals involved in personal archiving consider all media to be relevant sources as long as this relates to the life, memories and experiences of a person. The majority of material is written, photographic, audio or video in nature. Those experiences can relate to their lives, those of living relatives or ancestors. Those engaged in this practice also see their life experiences as a potential source of historical and cultural record, as well as being able to re-live those moments personally. Many see the digital age as bringing an opportunity to leave a richer legacy for future generations.

== Examples of personal archives ==
Personal archives may not always be in the vein of genealogy. They may not always even be indicative of the individual who created the collection. A personal archive can range massively in content. For example one individual may deem their record collection as a personal archive and then another person may deem their dry-cleaning receipts worthy of retention. One such example of the latter was the actress Vivien Leigh. What will be of interest for research in the future is unpredictable. However, Leigh's laundry receipts provided insight into how mid twentieth century haute couture was preserved and presented in public.

== See also ==
- Digital inheritance
- Death and the Internet
