= Patricia Kennedy Grimsted =

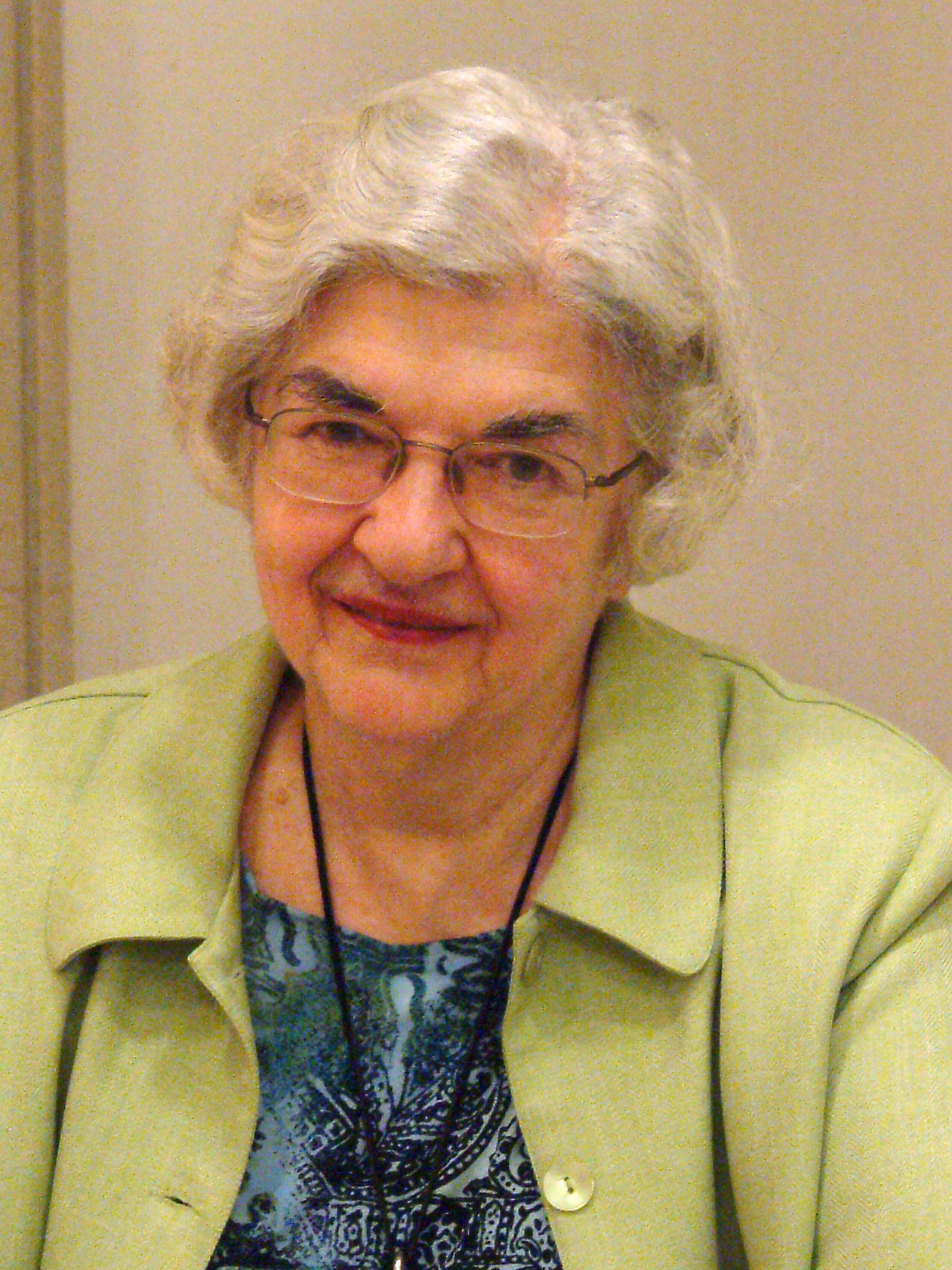
Grimsted in 2008

Patricia Kennedy Grimsted (born 1935 in Elkins, West Virginia) is a historian focused on the dispossession and restitution of cultural materials during and after World War II. She is a leading authority on archives in the former Soviet Union and its successor states.

Grimsted is an associate at the Davis Center for Russian and Eurasian Studies and a senior research associate at the Ukrainian Research Institute, both at Harvard University, and an honorary Fellow of the International Institute of Social History in Amsterdam. Her books have been called "the best guide" to archives of the former Soviet Union.

Her current project is Updated and Expanded guide to archives of the Einsatzstab Reichsleiter Rosenberg and fate of its loot, online updated edition, sponsored by the Conference for Jewish Material Claims Against Germany (Claims Conference), ERR Project, and International Institute for Social History (Amsterdam).

Grimsted has taught at several universities, including American University and the University of Maryland near Washington. She is the West's leading authority on archives of the Russian Federation, Ukraine, and the other ex-Soviet states. Among many fellowships and awards, she was a Fellow at the Center for Advanced Holocaust Studies of the United States Holocaust Memorial Museum (2000-2001), and in 2002 she received the Distinguished Contribution to Slavic Studies Award from the American Association for the Advancement of Slavic Studies.

== Education ==
Grimsted received an A.B. (1957), M.A. (1959), and Ph.D. (1964) in Russian history from the University of California, Berkeley. Foreign languages -- Russian, French.

== Selected works ==
Grimsted is the author of several historical monographs, documentary publications, and a series of directories and many other studies on Soviet-area archives, including the comprehensive Archives of Russia. She has 184 works in 543 publications in 5 languages and 4,579 library holdings.

- A Handbook for Archival Research in the USSR. International Research and Exchanges Board (1989)
- The Foreign Ministers of Alexander I: Political Attitudes and the Conduct of Russian Diplomacy, 1801–1825. University of California Press (1969)
- Archives and Manuscript Repositories in the USSR: Moscow and Leningrad. Princeton University Press (1972)
- Trophies of War and Empire: The Archival Heritage of Ukraine, World War II, and the International Politics of Restitution (2001)
- The "Lithuanian Metrica" in Moscow and Warsaw: Reconstructing the Archives of the Grand Duchy of Lithuania: Including an Annotated Edition of the 1887 Inventory Compiled by Stanisław Ptaszycki. Institute of History of the Polish Academy of Sciences (1984)
- Returned from Russia: Nazi Archival Plunder in Western Europe and Recent Restitution Issues. Institute of Art and Law (2007), Paper edition with an updated "Afterword — 2013," (Fall 2013).
- "Spoils of War Returned: U.S. Restitution of Nazi-Looted Cultural Treasures to the USSR, 1945 - 1959", Prologue, Fall 2002, Vol. 34, No. 3
- Reconstructing the Record of Nazi Cultural Plunder:A Survey of the Dispersed Archives of the Einsatzstab Reichsleiter Rosenberg (ERR) (International Institute for Social History, 2011).
- “Spoils of War v. Cultural Heritage: The Russian Cultural Property Law in Historical Context,” editor and major contributor, International Journal of Cultural Property 17, no. 2 (2010).
- Archives of Russia: A Directory and Bibliographic Guide to Holdings in Moscow and St. Petersburg, edited and wrote preface (M.E. Sharpe, 2000).
- “ArcheoBiblioBase" – Internet directory and bibliography of Russian archives, in conjunction with the State Public Historical Library (Moscow) and the International Institute of Social History (Amsterdam).
