= Archive =

Accumulation of historical records

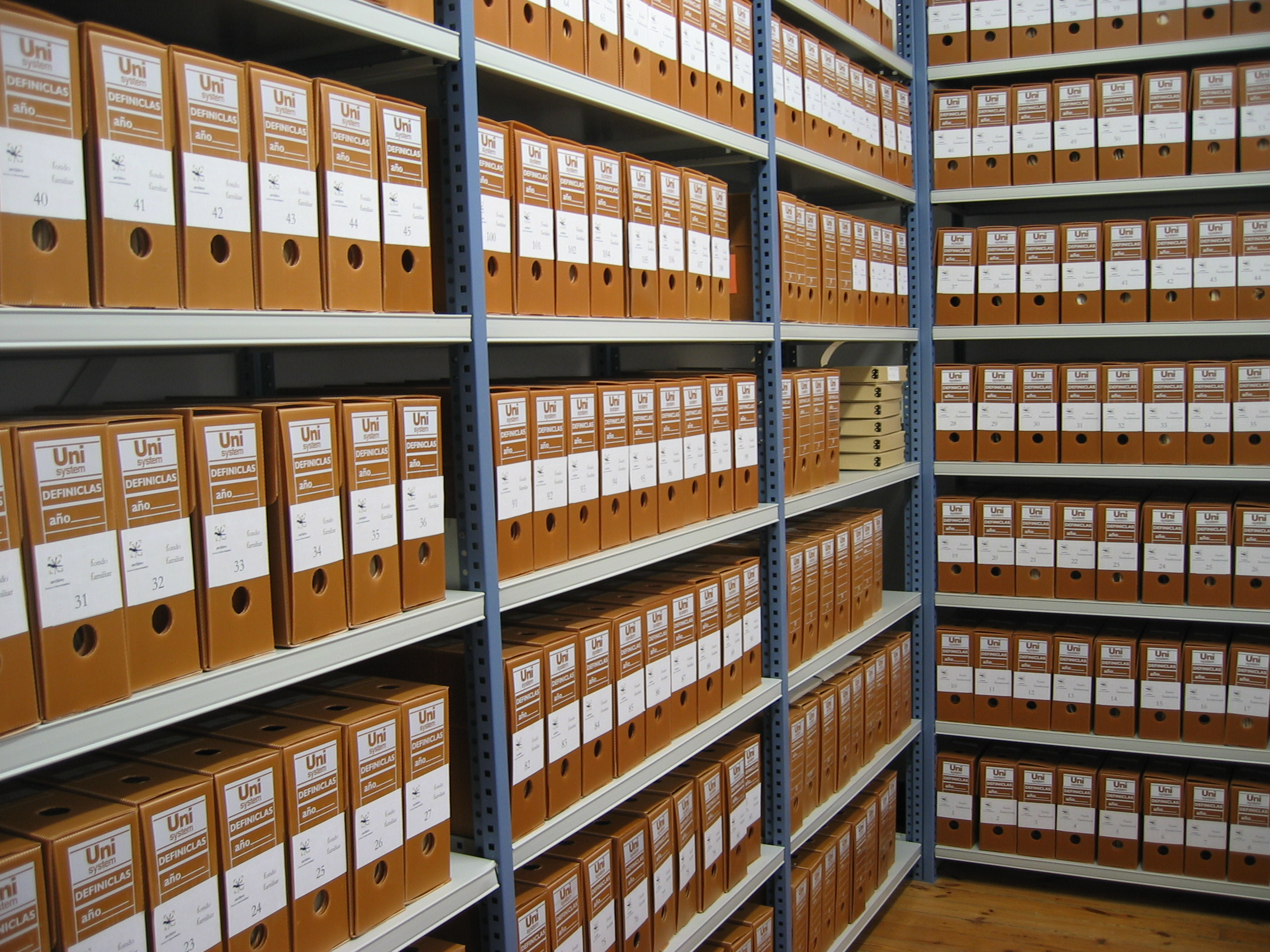
Shelved record boxes of an archive

An archive is an accumulation of historical records or materials, in any medium, or the physical facility in which they are located.

Archives contain primary source documents that have accumulated over the course of an individual or organization's lifetime, and are kept to show the history and function of that person or organization. Professional archivists and historians generally understand archives to be records that have been naturally and necessarily generated as a product of regular legal, commercial, administrative, or social activities. They have been metaphorically defined as "the secretions of an organism", and are distinguished from documents that have been consciously written or created to communicate a particular message to posterity.

Generally, archives consist of records that have been selected for permanent or long-term preservation on the grounds of their enduring cultural, historical, or evidentiary value. Archival records are normally unpublished and very often unique, unlike books or magazines, of which many identical copies may exist. This means that archives are quite distinct from libraries with regard to their functions and organization, although archival collections can often be found within library buildings. While archives are traditionally collections of documents, some scholars argue that buildings can be a type of archive. The choice of what to include in an archive can be a political act.

A person who works in archives is called an archivist. The study and practice of organizing, preserving, and providing access to information and materials in archives is called archival science. The physical place of storage can be referred to as an archive (more usual in the United Kingdom), an archives (more usual in the United States), or a repository.

The use of the term "archive" with regards to computing (referring to a computer file storing the content of one or more others) should not be confused with the record-keeping meaning.

== Etymology ==
The English word archive /ˈɑːrkaɪv/ is derived from the French archives (plural), and in turn from Latin archīum or archīvum, the romanized form of the Greek ἀρχεῖον (arkheion). The Greek term originally referred to the home or dwelling of the Archon, a ruler or chief magistrate, in which important official state documents were filed and interpreted; from there its meaning broadened to encompass such concepts as "town hall" and "public records". The root of the Greek word is ἀρχή (arkhē), meaning among other things "magistracy, office, government", and derived from the verb ἄρχω (arkhō), meaning "to begin, rule, govern" (also the root of English words such as "anarchy" and "monarchy").

The word archive was first attested in English in the early 17th century, and the word archivist in the mid-18th century, although in these periods both terms were usually used only in reference to foreign institutions and personnel. Not until the late 19th century did they begin to be used widely in domestic contexts.

The adjective formed from archive is archival.

== History ==
The practice of keeping official documents is very old. Archaeologists have discovered archives of hundreds (and sometimes thousands) of clay tablets dating back to the third and second millennia BC in sites like Ebla, Mari, Amarna, Hattusas, Ugarit, and Pylos. These discoveries have been fundamental to learning about ancient alphabets, languages, literature, and politics.

Oral literature, such as Palestinian hikaye, can also have archival functions for communities.

Archives were well developed by the ancient Chinese, the ancient Greeks, and the ancient Romans (who called them Tabularia). The idea that a society would designate a place to preserve records is integral to the Justinian Code (which set Roman law).

England, after 1066, developed archives and archival access methods. The Swiss developed archival systems after 1450.

The earliest archival manuals: Jacob von Rammingen, Von der Registratur (1571), Baldassarre Bonifacio, De Archivis (1632).

The first predecessors of archival science in the West are Jacob von Rammingen's manuals of 1571. and Baldassarre Bonifacio's De Archivis libris singularis of 1632.

Modern archiving has some roots dating back to the French Revolution. The French National Archives, which possess perhaps the largest archival collection in the world (with records going as far back as 625 A.D.), was created in 1790 during the Revolution from various government, religious, and private archives seized by the revolutionaries.

In 1883, French archivist Gabriel Richou published the first Western text on archival theory, entitled Traité théorique et pratique des archives publiques (Treaty of Theory and Practice of the Public Archives), in which he systematized the archival theory of the respect des fonds, first published by Natalis de Wailly in 1841.

== Users and institutions ==
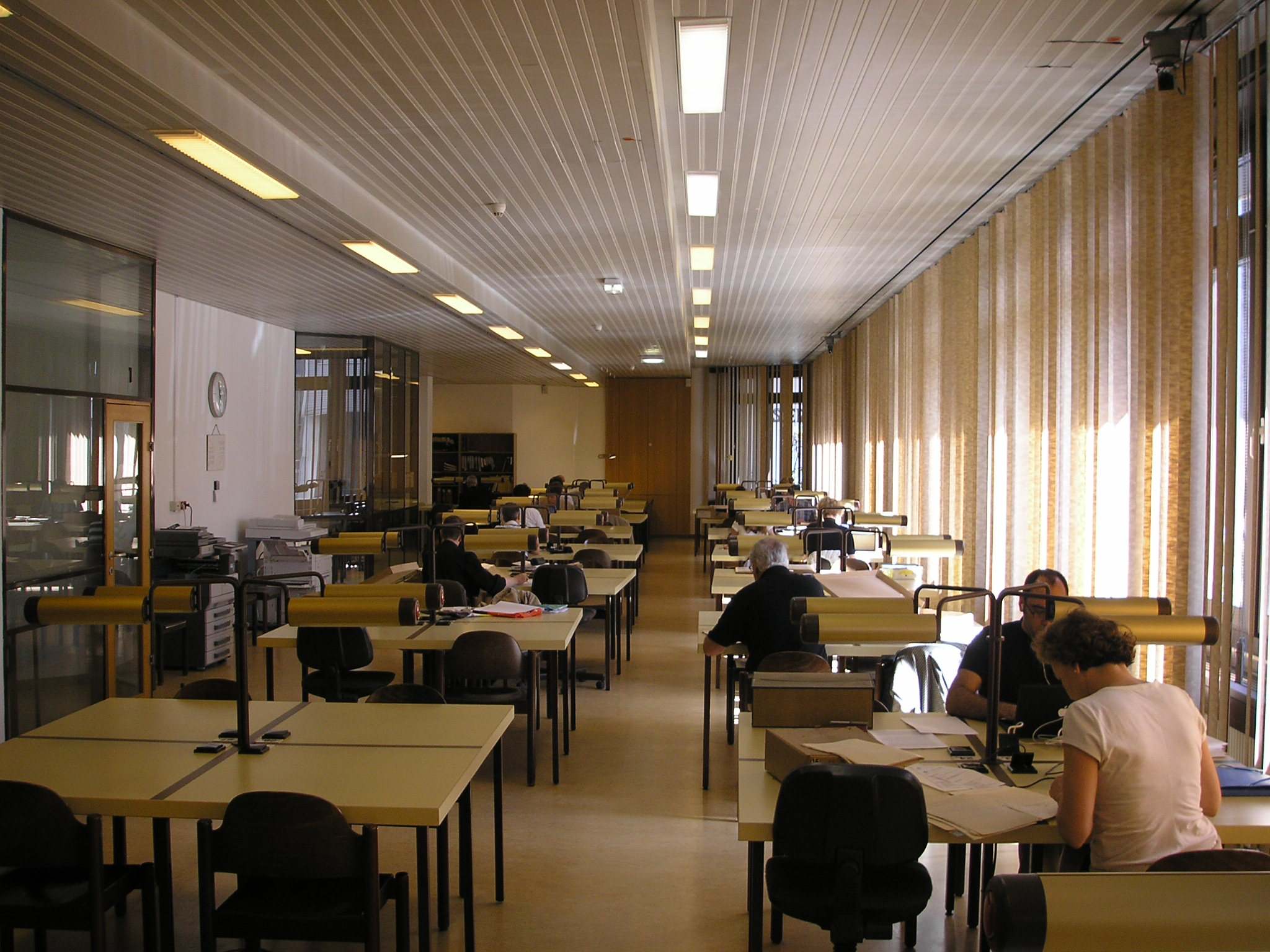
Reading room of the Österreichisches Staatsarchiv (Austrian State Archive), in the Erdberg district of Vienna (2006)

Historians, genealogists, lawyers, demographers, filmmakers, and others conduct research at archives. The research process at each archive is unique and depends upon the institution that houses the archive. While there are many kinds of archives, the most recent census of archivists in the United States identifies five major types: academic, business (for profit), government, non-profit, and others. There are also four main areas of inquiry involved with archives: material technologies, organizing principles, geographic locations, and tangled embodiments of humans and non-humans. These areas help to further categorize what kind of archive is being created.

=== Academic ===
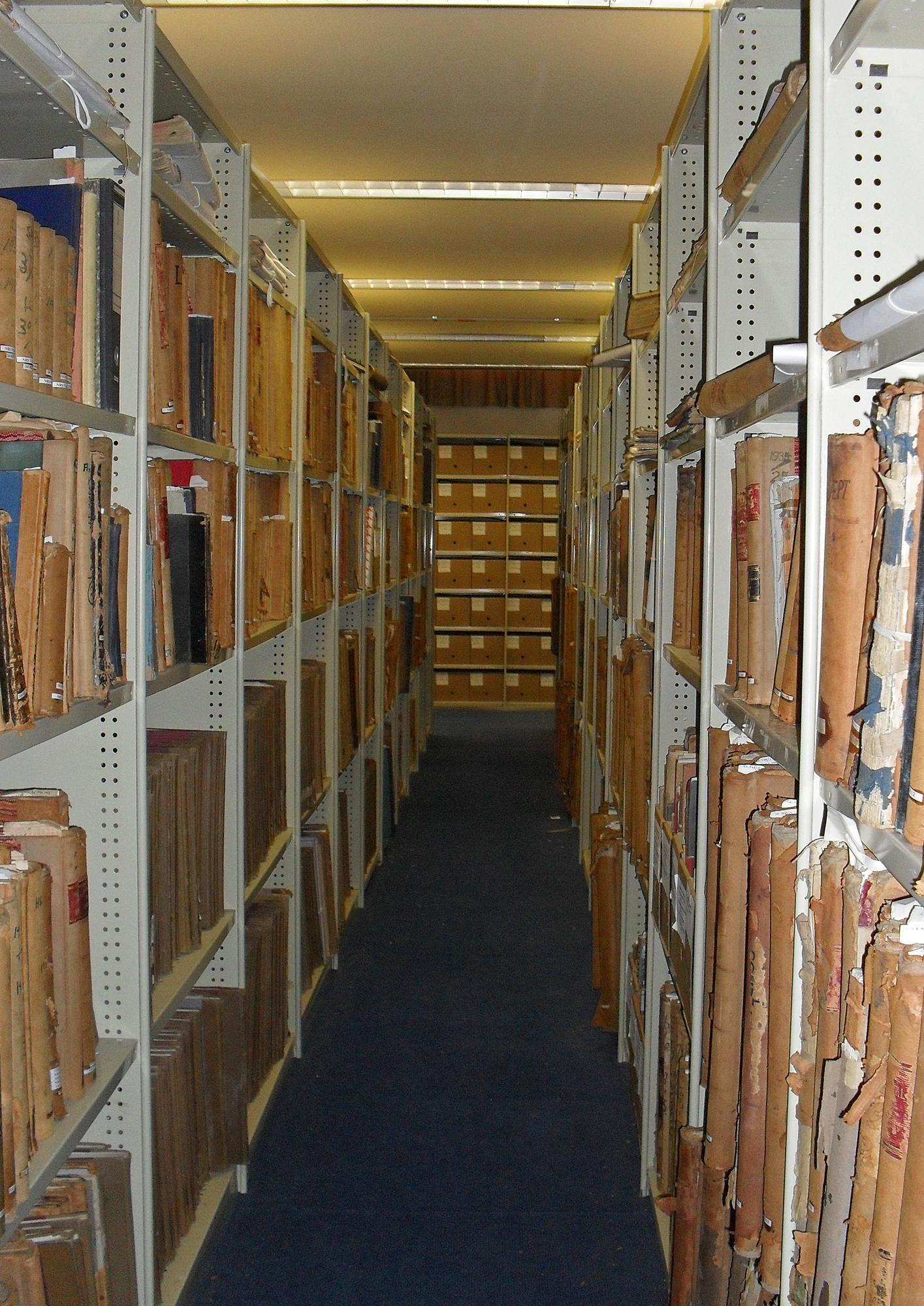
Charles Sturt University Regional Archives

Archives in colleges, universities, and other educational facilities are typically housed within a library, and duties may be carried out by an archivist. Academic archives exist to preserve institutional history and serve the academic community. An academic archive may contain materials such as the institution's administrative records, personal and professional papers of former professors and presidents, memorabilia related to school organizations and activities, and items the academic library wishes to remain in a closed-stack setting, such as rare books or thesis copies. Access to the collections in these archives is usually by prior appointment only; some have posted hours for making inquiries. Users of academic archives can be undergraduates, graduate students, faculty and staff, scholarly researchers, and the general public. Many academic archives work closely with alumni relations departments or other campus institutions to help raise funds for their library or school. Qualifications for employment may vary. Entry-level positions usually require an undergraduate diploma, but typically archivists hold graduate degrees in history or library science (preferably certified by a body such as the American Library Association). Subject-area specialization becomes more common in higher-ranking positions.

=== Business ===
Archives located in for-profit institutions are usually those owned by a private business. Examples of prominent business archives in the United States include Coca-Cola (which also owns the separate museum World of Coca-Cola), Procter and Gamble, Motorola Heritage Services and Archives, and Levi Strauss & Co. These corporate archives maintain historic documents and items related to the history and administration of their companies. Business archives serve the purpose of helping corporations maintain control over their brand by retaining memories of the company's past. Especially in business archives, records management is separate from the historical aspect of archives. Workers in these types of archives may have any combination of training and degrees, from either a history or library background. These archives are typically not open to the public and are only used by workers of the owner company, though some allow approved visitors by appointment. Business archives are concerned with maintaining the integrity of their company and are therefore selective about how their materials may be used.

=== Government ===
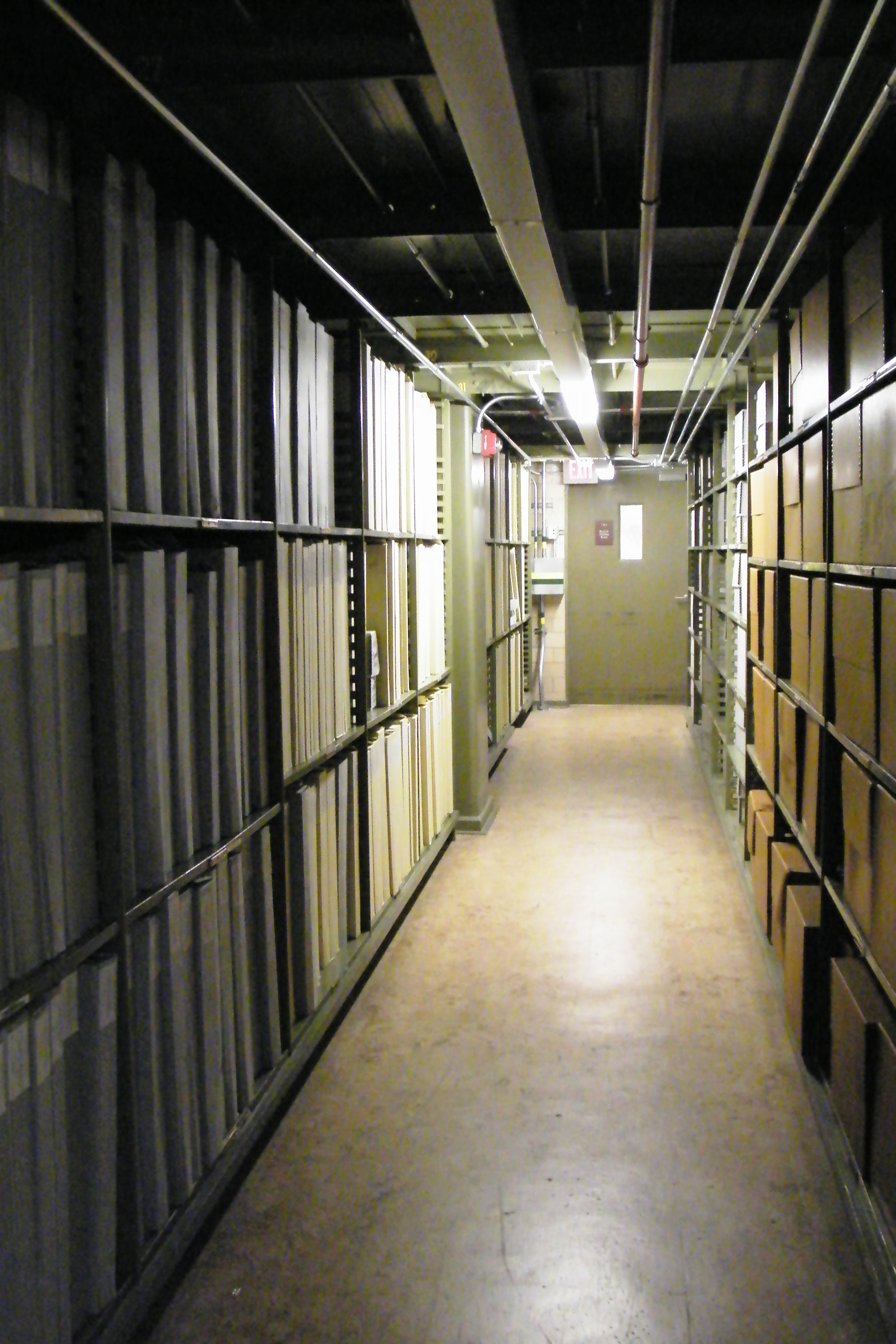
Storage facility at the National Archives and Records Administration, Washington, D.C.

Government archives include those maintained by local and state governments as well as those maintained by the national (or federal) government. Anyone may use a government archive, and frequent users include reporters, genealogists, writers, historians, students, and people seeking information on the history of their home or region. Many government archives are open to the public, and no appointment is required to visit.

In the United States, the National Archives and Records Administration (NARA) maintains central archival facilities in the District of Columbia and College Park, Maryland, with regional facilities distributed throughout the United States. Some city or local governments may have repositories, but their organization and accessibility vary widely. Similar to the library profession, certification requirements and education also varies widely, from state to state. Professional associations themselves encourage the need to professionalize. NARA offers the Certificate of Federal Records Management Training Program for professional development. The majority of state and local archives staff hold a bachelor's degree—increasingly repositories list advanced degrees (e.g. MA, MLS/MLIS, Ph.D.) and certifications as a position requirement or preference.

In the UK, the National Archives (formerly known as the Public Record Office) is the government archive for England and Wales. The physical records stored by the National Archives amount to 185 km (115 miles) of shelving, a number that increases every year. The English Heritage Archive is the public archive of English Heritage. The National Records of Scotland, located in Edinburgh, serves that country; while the Public Record Office of Northern Ireland in Belfast is the government archive for Northern Ireland.

A network of county record offices and other local authority-run archives exists throughout England, Wales, and Scotland and holds many important collections, including local government, landed estates, church, and business records. Many archives have contributed catalogs to the national "Access to Archives" program and online searching across collections is possible.

In France, the French Archives Administration (Service interministériel des Archives de France) in the Ministry of Culture supervises the National Archives (Archives nationales), which possess 373 km (232 miles) of physical records as of 2020 (the total length of occupied shelves put next to each other), with original records going as far back as A.D. 625, and 74.75 terabytes (74,750 GB) of electronic archives, as well as the National Overseas Archives (ANOM, 36.5 kilometres (22.7 mi) of physical records), the National Archives of the World of Labour (ANMT, 49.8 kilometres (30.9 mi) of physical records), and all local public archives (departmental archives, or archives départementales, located in the préfectures of each of the 100 départements of France plus the City of Paris, more than 400 municipal archives in the larger towns and cities of France, and 12 newer regional archives) which possess 3,591 km (2,231 miles) of physical records and 225.25 terabytes of electronic archives (as of 2020). Put together, the total volume of archives under the supervision of the French Archives Administration is the largest in the world.

The archives of the French Ministry of Armed Forces (Defence Historical Service, ca. 450 kilometres (280 mi) of physical records) and the archives of the French Ministry of Foreign Affairs (Diplomatic Archives, ca. 120 kilometres (75 mi) of physical records) are managed separately by their respective ministries and do not fall under the jurisdiction of the Archives of France Administration.

In India, the National Archives (NAI) are located in New Delhi.

In Taiwan, the National Archives Administration are located in Taipei.

Most intergovernmental organizations keep their own historical archives. However, a number of European organizations, including the European Commission, choose to deposit their archives with the European University Institute in Florence.

=== Church ===
A prominent church archive is the Vatican Apostolic Archive. Archdioceses, dioceses, and parishes also have archives in the Roman Catholic and Anglican Churches. Very important are monastery archives because of their antiquity, like the ones of Monte Cassino, Saint Gall, and Fulda. The records in these archives include manuscripts, papal records, local church records, photographs, oral histories, audiovisual materials, and architectural drawings.

Most Protestant denominations have archives as well, including the Presbyterian Historical Society, the Moravian Church Archives, the Southern Baptist Historical Library and Archives, the United Methodist Archives and History Center of the United Methodist Church, and the Christian Church (Disciples of Christ).

=== Motion pictures, film, and audio and video tape ===
Film archives collect, restore, investigate and conserve audiovisual content like films, documentaries, tv programs and newsreel footage. Often, a country has its own film archive to preserve its national audiovisual heritage. The International Federation of Film Archives comprises more than 150 institutions in over 77 countries and the Association of European Film Archives and Cinematheques is an affiliation of 49 European national and regional film archives founded in 1991. For a comprehensive look at the history of film preservation and the institutions and organizations that developed various practices, see Penelope Houston's Keepers of the Frame.

=== Non-profit ===
Non-profit archives include those in historical societies, not-for-profit businesses such as hospitals, and repositories within foundations. Such repositories are typically set up with private funds from donors to preserve the papers and histories of specific people or places. These institutions may rely on grant funding from the government as well as private funds. Depending on the availability of funds, non-profit archives may be as small as the historical society in a rural town to as big as a state historical society that rivals a government archive. Users of this type of archive may vary as much as the institutions that hold it. Employees of non-profit archives may be professional archivists, paraprofessionals, or volunteers, as the education required for a position at a non-profit archive varies with the demands of the collection's user base.

=== Web archiving ===
Web archiving is the process of collecting portions of the World Wide Web and ensuring the collection is preserved in an archive, such as an archive site, for future researchers, historians, and the public. Due to the massive size of the Web, web archivists typically employ web crawlers for automated collection.

Similarly, software code and documentation can be archived on the web, as with the example of CPAN.

=== Dark archives ===
Archives that are collected and kept in cold storage (i.e., not openly accessible) are sometimes called dark archives. For example in 2025, the academic paper repository arXiv was concerned about trends in the United States and elsewhere that might restrict academic freedoms. They created a dark archive of the website, so it could be reconstituted in another country, if required. Dark archive is also used in library science for collections of online publications that are held in reserve in case the publisher no longer makes them available.

=== Other ===
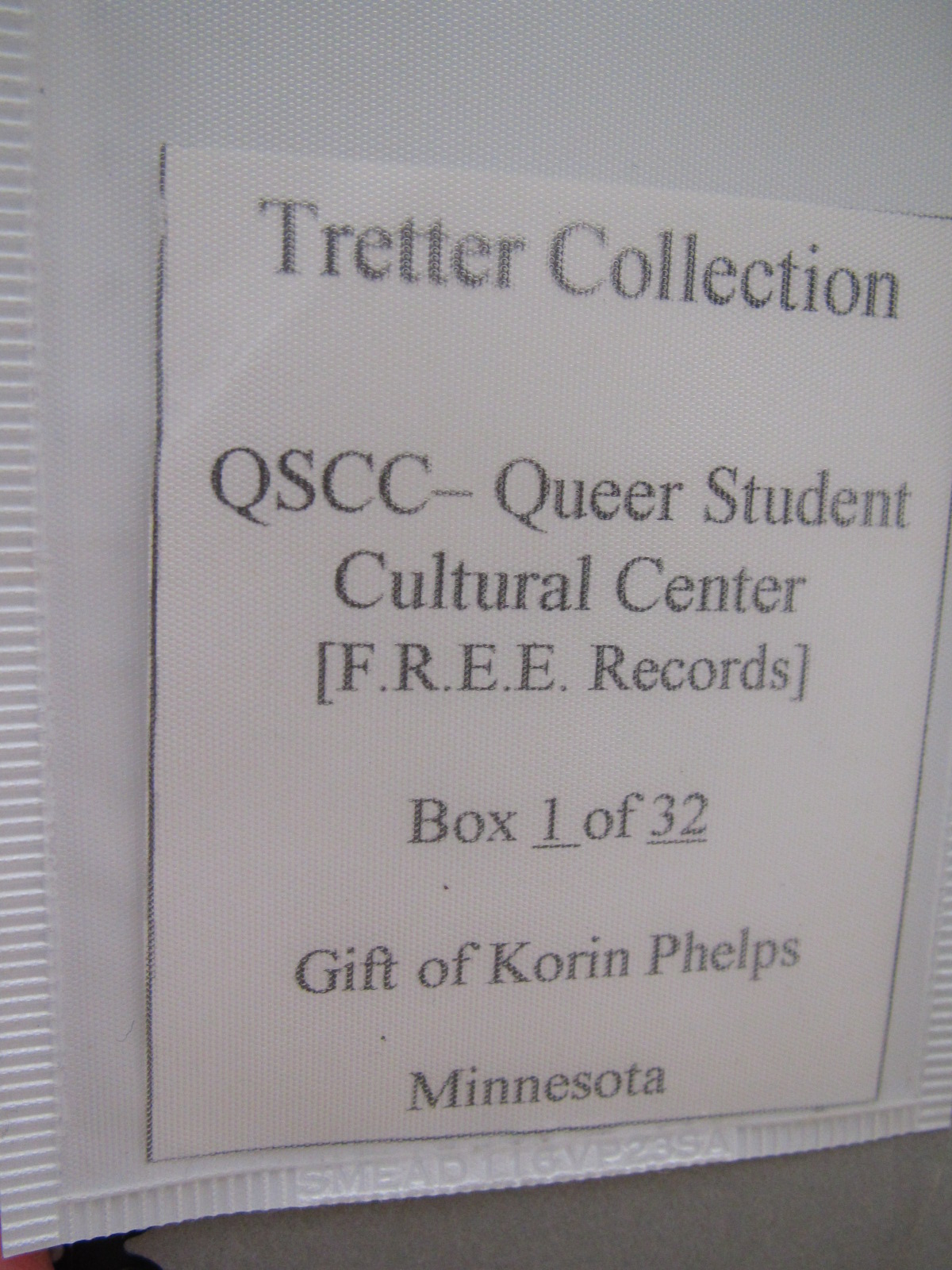
Jean-Nickolaus Tretter Collection in Gay, Lesbian, Bisexual and Transgender Studies in May 2013

Some archives defy categorization. There are tribal archives within the Native American nations in North America, and there are archives that exist within the papers of private individuals. Many museums keep archives in order to prove the provenance of their pieces. Any institution or persons wishing to keep their significant papers in an organized fashion that employs the most basic principles of archival science may have an archive. In the 2004 census of archivists taken in the United States, 2.7% of archivists were employed in institutions that defied categorization. This was a separate figure from the 1.3% that identified themselves as self-employed.

Another type of archive is the Public Secrets project. This is an interactive testimonial, in which women incarcerated in the California State Prison System describe what happened to them. The archive's mission is to gather stories from women who want to express themselves and want their stories heard. This collection includes transcripts and an audio recording of the women telling their stories.

The archives of an individual may include letters, papers, photographs, computer files, scrapbooks, financial records, or diaries created or collected by the individual, regardless of medium or format. The archives of an organization (such as a corporation or government) tend to contain other types of records, such as administrative files, business records, memos, official correspondence, and meeting minutes. Some archives are made up of a compilation of both types of collections. An example of this type of combined compilation is the Transgender Archives at the University of Victoria, which contain a multitude of collections of donations from both individuals and organizations from all over the world. Many of these donations have yet to be cataloged but are currently in the process of being digitally preserved and made available to the public online.

The Arctic World Archive is a commercially-run facility for data preservation located in the Svalbard archipelago, Norway, that contains data of historical and cultural interest from several countries as well as all of American multinational company GitHub's open source code. The data is kept on reels of specially developed film in a steel vault buried deep beneath the permafrost, with the data storage medium expected to last for 500 to 1000 years.

== Standardization ==
The International Council on Archives (ICA) has developed a number of standards on archival description, including the General International Standard Archival Description ISAD(G). ISAD (G) is meant to be used in conjunction with national standards or as a basis for nations to build their own standards. In the United States, ISAD (G) is implemented through Describing Archives: A Content Standard, popularly known as "DACS". In Canada, ISAD (G) is implemented through the Council of Archives as the Rules for Archival Description, also known as "RAD".

ISO is currently developing standards.

== Protection ==
The cultural property stored in archives is threatened by natural disasters, wars, or other emergencies in many countries. International partners for archives are UNESCO and Blue Shield International, in accordance with the Hague Convention for the Protection of Cultural Property from 1954 and its 2nd Protocol from 1999. From a national and international perspective, there are many collaborations between archives and local Blue Shield organizations to ensure the sustainable existence of cultural property storage facilities. In addition to working with United Nations peacekeeping in the event of war, the protection of the archives requires the creation of "no-strike lists", the linking of civil and military structures, and the training of local personnel.

== Limitations and alternatives ==
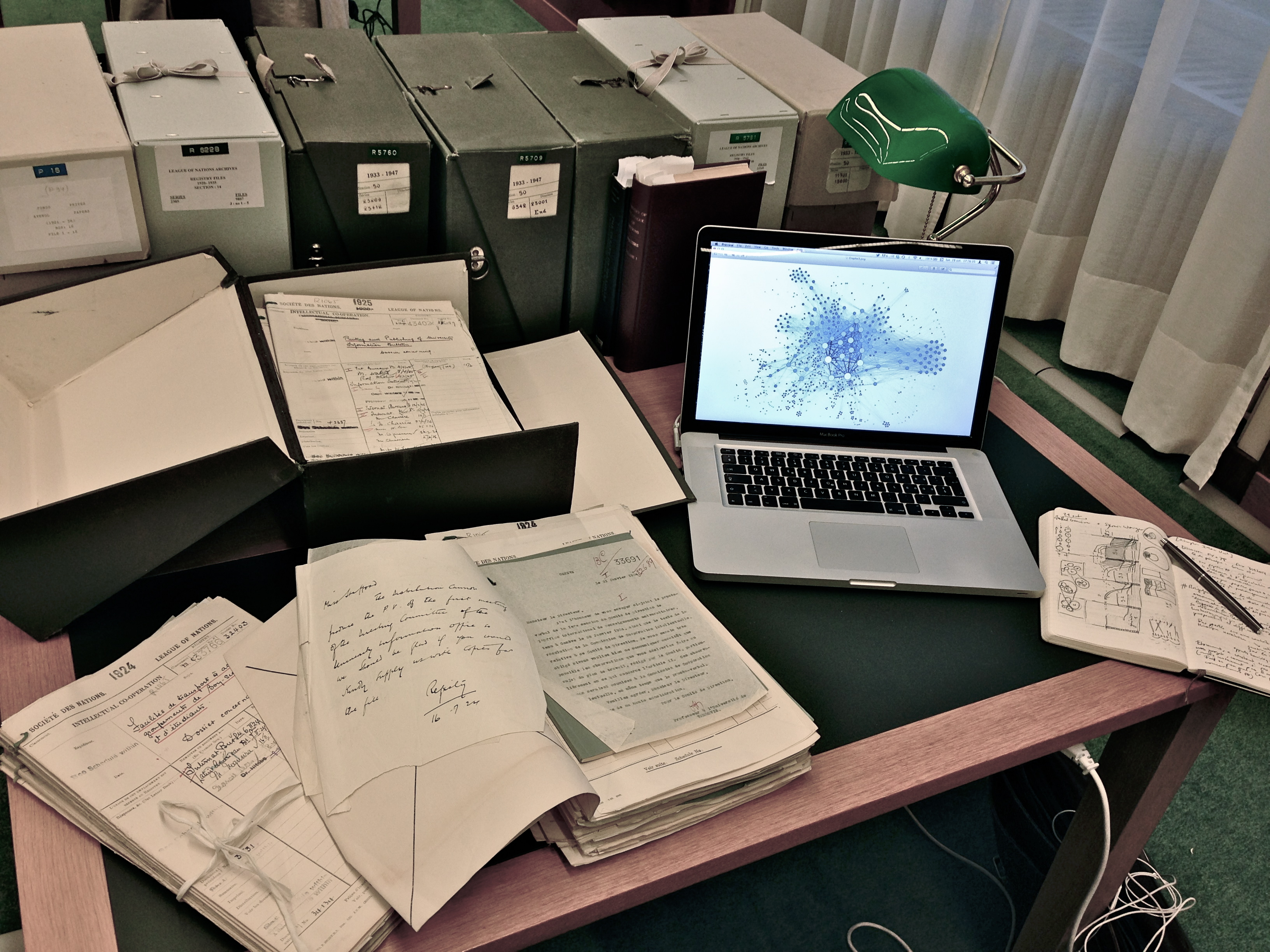
Illustration of the epistemologic changes of the digital humanities: archives organized with network visualization and analysis. League of Nations archives (UN Geneva).

Archives that primarily contain physical artifacts and printed documents are increasingly shifting to digitizing items that did not originate digitally, which are then usually stored away. This allows for greater accessibility when using search tools and databases, as well as an increase in the availability of digitized materials from outside the physical parameters of an archive, but there may be an element of loss or disconnect when there are gaps in what items are made available digitally. Both physical and digital archives also generally have specific limitations regarding the types of content that are deemed able to be preserved, categorized, and archived. Conventional institutionalized archive spaces have a tendency to prioritize tangible items over ephemeral experiences, actions, effects, and even bodies. This type of potentially biased prioritization may be seen as a form of privileging particular types of knowledge or interpreting certain experiences as more valid than others, limiting the content available to archive users, leading to barriers in accessing information, and potentially alienating under-represented and/or marginalized populations and their epistemologies and ontologies. As Omnia El Shakry shows, dealing with destruction is a challenge central to decolonial historiography. When faced with a lack of archival documents, historians resort to different sources and methods. For example, due to the lack of a Palestinian state archive, many historians of Nakba had to rely on sources in the Israeli state's archives.

As a result of this perceived under-representation, some activists are making efforts to decolonize contemporary archival institutions that may employ hegemonic and white supremacist practices by implementing subversive alternatives such as anarchiving or counter-archiving with the intention of making intersectional accessibility a priority for those who cannot or do not want to access contemporary archival institutions. An example of this is Morgan M. Page's description of disseminating transgender history directly to trans people through various social media and networking platforms like tumblr, Twitter, and Instagram, as well as via podcast. While the majority of archived materials are typically well conserved within their collections, anarchiving's attention to ephemerality also brings to light the inherent impermanence and gradual change of physical objects over time as a result of being handled.

The concept of counter-archiving brings into question what tends to be considered archivable and what is therefore selected to be preserved within conventional contemporary archives. With the options available through counter-archiving, there is the potential to "challenge traditional conceptions of history" as they are perceived within contemporary archives, which creates space for narratives that are often not present in many archival materials. The unconventional nature of counter-archiving practices makes room for the maintenance of ephemeral qualities contained within certain historically significant experiences, performances, and personally or culturally relevant stories that do not typically have a space in conventional archives.

The practices of anarchiving and counter-archiving are both rooted in social justice work.

== See also ==
- Archival informatics
- Archival research
- Archival science
- Archive Fever (book by Jacques Derrida)
- Archive file
- Archivist
- Archives management
- Backup
- BS 5454
- Collection (museum)
- Computer data storage
- Data proliferation
- Database
- Data library
- Digital preservation
- Greenstone (software)
- Information management
- Information repository
- International Council on Archives
- Internet Archive
- Knowledge ark
- Manuscript processing
- Preservation (library and archival science)
- Solander box
- Time capsule
- Web archiving
- List of archives and List of national archives
