= Natalis de Wailly =

French archivist, librarian and historian

- Born: 10 May 1805; Charleville-Mézières, France
- Died: 4 December 1886 (aged 81); Paris, France
- Occupations: Archivist, librarian, historian

Natalis de Wailly (10 May 1805 – 4 December 1886) was a French archivist, librarian and historian.

In 1841, as head of the Administrative Section of the Royal Archives, he wrote a ministerial circular, issued by Count Tanneguy Duchâtel, Minister of the Interior, stating that records should be grouped according to the nature of the institution that has accumulated them and formulating the principle of respect des fonds (up until that point, archives had often been sorted according to subject, date or place).

In 1854, he was appointed head of the manuscript department of the Bibliothèque impériale.

A member of the Académie des Inscriptions et Belles-Lettres since 1841 and of several learned societies (e.g. Société de l'histoire de France, Société des anciens textes français, Comité des travaux historiques et scientifiques), he was a renowned paleographer and published scientific editions of medieval chroniclers (e.g. Villehardouin and Joinville).

== Works ==
=== Books ===
- Éléments de paléographie, Paris : imprimerie royale, 1838, 2 vol. - vol.1 : XII-716 p. & vol.2 : IV-452 p.
- Mémoire sur des fragments de papyrus écrits en latin, Paris : imprimerie royale, 1842
- Mémoire sur la date et le lieu de naissance de Saint Louis, Paris : imprimerie royale, 1847
- Mémoire sur Geoffrey of Paris, Paris : imprimerie royale, 1849
- Mémoire sur les variations de la livre tournois depuis le règne de Saint Louis jusqu'à l'établissement de la monnaie décimale, Paris : imprimerie impériale, 1857
- Recherches sur le système monétaire de Saint Louis, Paris : imprimerie impériale, 1857
- Mémoire sur la langue de Joinville, Paris : librairie A. Franck, 1868
- Histoire de Saint Louis, suivie du Credo et de la lettre à Louis X, Paris : Éditions Mme veuve de Jules Renouard, 1868, XLIV-411, [url=http://gallica.bnf.fr/ark:/12148/bpt6k2003200.r|Read online].
- Recueil de chartes en langue vulgaire provenant des archives de la Collégiale de Saint-Pierre-d'Aire, Paris, 1870

=== Articles ===
- Notice sur six manuscrits contenant l'ouvrage anonyme publié en 1837 par M. Louis Paris sous le titre de Chronique de Rains, Notices et extraits des manuscrits de la Bibliothèque nationale et autres bibliothèques, 24:2, 1876, p. 289-340

=== Documents mis en ordre et commentés ===
- Récits d'un ménestrel de Reims au treizième siècle, publiés pour la Société de l'histoire de France, Paris : Renouard, 1876, vi+lxxi+332 p.
- Histoire de la conquête de Constantinople par Geoffroi de Ville-Hardouin, avec la continuation de Henri de Valenciennes : Texte rapproché du français moderne par Natalis de Wailly, Paris : Firmin-Didot, 1882

== Bibliography ==
- Henri Wallon, "Notice sur la vie et les travaux de M. Joseph-Natalis de Wailly", Bibliothèque de l'École des Chartes, 1888, p. 581-608.
