= Archivist =

Professional who preserves information for long-term use

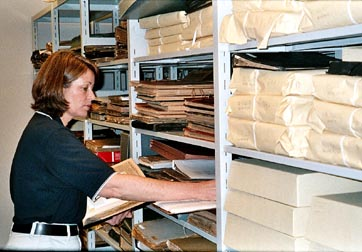
An archivist surveying an unprocessed collection of materials. Surveying is commonly done to determine priorities for preservation and/or conservation of materials before an archivist begins arrangement and description.

An archivist is an information professional who assesses, collects, organizes, preserves, maintains control over, and provides access to records and archives determined to have long-term value. The records that are maintained by an archivist can consist of a variety of forms, including but not limited to letters, diaries, logs, other personal documents, government documents, sound or picture recordings, digital files, or other physical objects.

== Description ==
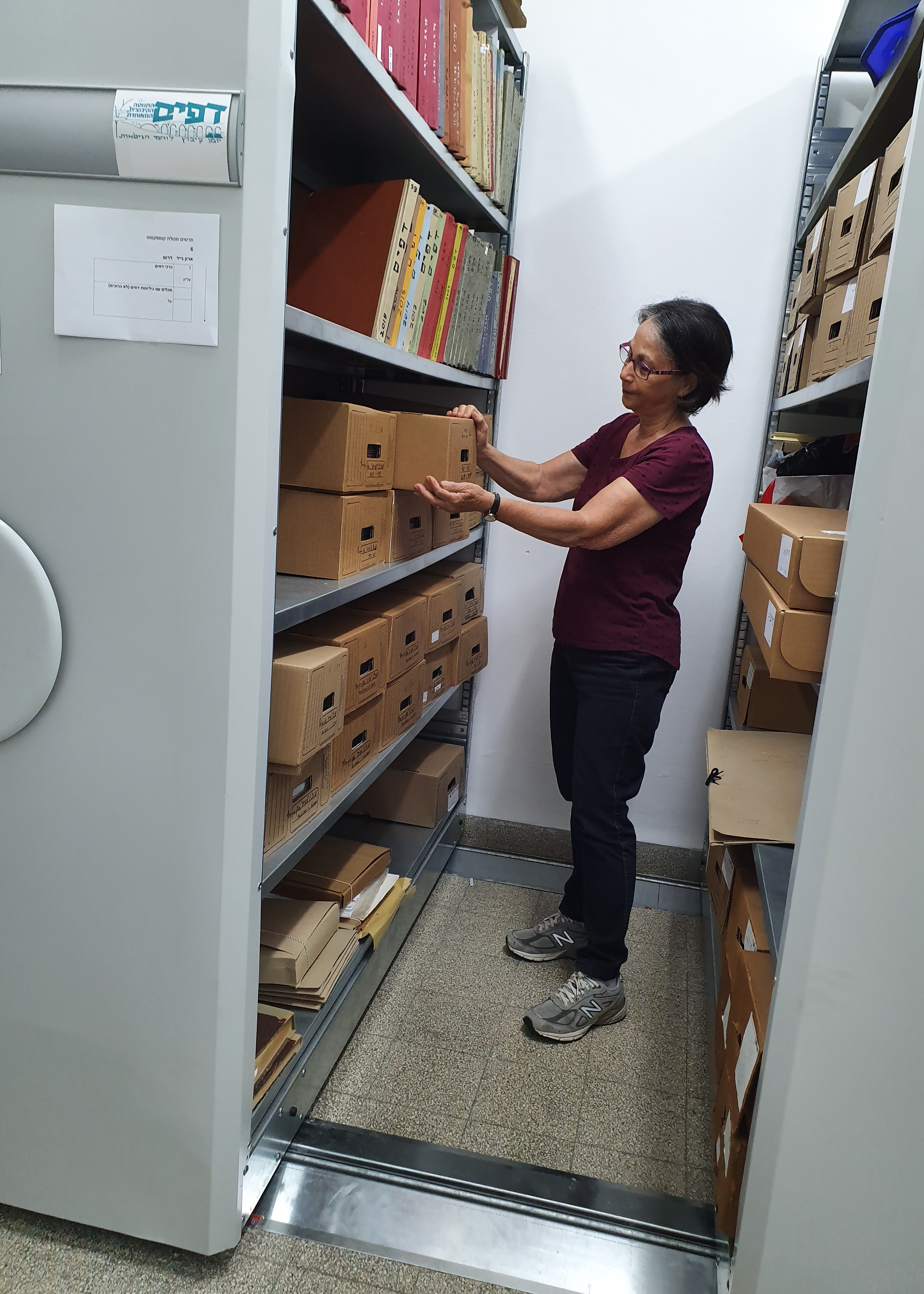
An archivist retrieving files from mobile shelving

As Richard Pearce-Moses wrote:

Archivists keep records that have enduring value as reliable memories of the past, and they help people find and understand the information they need in those records.

Determining what records have enduring value can be challenging. Archivists must also select records valuable enough to justify the costs of storage and preservation, plus the labor-intensive expenses of arrangement, description, and reference service. The theory and scholarly work underpinning archives practices is called archival science.

The most common related occupations are librarians, museum curators, and records managers. The occupation of archivist is distinct from that of librarian. The two occupations have separate courses of training, adhere to separate and distinct principles, and are represented by separate professional organizations. In general, the librarian tends to deal with published media (where the metadata, such as author, title, and date of publication, may be readily apparent and can be presented in standardized form), whereas the archivist deals with unpublished media (which has different challenges such as the metadata not always being immediately apparent, containing complications and variety, and more likely to depend on provenance). The Society of American Archivists (SAA) also notes that while both professions preserve, collect, and make materials accessible, librarians can often obtain "new copies of worn-out or lost books", while records in archival collections are unique and irreplaceable. The SAA further distinguishes libraries and archives based on the materials they keep and how they are accessed by patrons.

Because archival records are frequently unique, archivists may be as much concerned with the preservation and custody of the information carrier (i.e. the physical document) as with its informational content. In this sense, the archivist may have more in common with the museum curator than with the librarian. The SAA states that museum curators and archivists sometimes overlap in their duties, but that curators often collect and interpret three-dimensional objects, while archivists deal with paper, electronic, or audiovisual records. Even so, archival selections are sometimes exhibited in museums.

The occupation of archivist is also frequently distinguished from that of records manager, although in this case the distinction is less absolute: the archivist is predominantly concerned with records deemed worthy of permanent preservation, whereas the records manager is more concerned with records of current administrative importance.

The SAA additionally notes that historians and archivists have a long-standing partnership, as archivists preserve, identify, and make records accessible, while historians use those records for their research.

== Duties and work environment ==
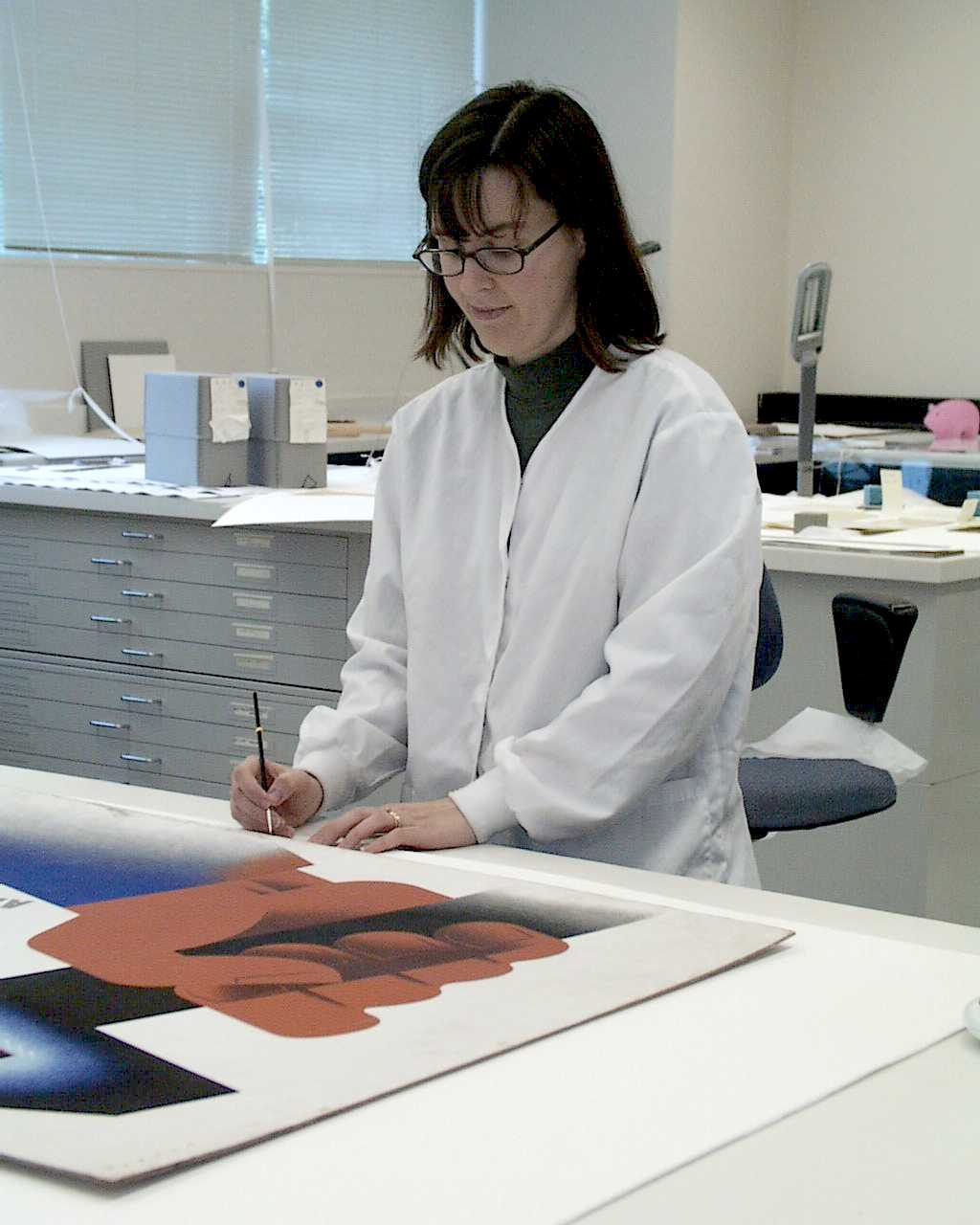
Inside a conservation lab, items are being prepared.

Archivists' duties include acquiring and appraising new collections, arranging and describing records, providing reference service, and preserving materials. In arranging records, archivists apply two important principles: provenance and original order. Provenance refers to the creation of records and keeping different records separate in order to maintain context. Many entities create records, including governments, businesses, universities, and individuals. Original order is applied by keeping records in their order as established and maintained by the creator(s). Both provenance and original order are closely related to the concept of respect des fonds, which states that records from one corporate body should not be mixed with records from another.

There are two aspects to arrangement: intellectual and physical. Both aspects follow the principle of original order. Archivists process the records physically by placing them in acid-free folders and boxes to ensure their long-term survival. They also process the records intellectually, by determining what the records consist of, how they are organized, and what, if any, finding aids need to be created. Finding aids can be box lists or descriptive inventories, or indexes. Even if the original arrangement is unclear or unhelpful in terms of accessing the collection, it is rarely rearranged to something that makes more sense. This is because preserving the original order shows how the creator of the records functioned, why the records were created, and how they went about arranging them. Moreover, the provenance and authenticity of the records may be lost. However, original order is not always the best way to maintain some collections and archivists must use their own experience and current best practices to determine the correct way to preserve collections of mixed media or those lacking a clear original arrangement.

Archivists' work encompasses a range of ethical decisions that may be thought of as falling into three broad and intertwined areas: legal requirements; professional standards; and accountability to society in selecting and preserving documentary materials that serve as a primary source of knowledge, and influence collective memory and identity. In negotiating the ethical conflicts that arise in their work, archivists are guided by codes of ethics. The Society of American Archivists first adopted a code of ethics in 1980; the International Council on Archives adopted one in 1996.

Alongside their work in arranging and caring for collections, archivists assist users in interpreting materials and answering inquiries. This reference work can be a small part of an archivist's job in a smaller organization, or consist of most of their occupation in a larger archive where specific roles (such as processing archivist and reference archivist) may be delineated.

Archivists work for a variety of organizations, including government agencies, local authorities, museums, hospitals, historical societies, businesses, charities, corporations, colleges and universities, national parks and historic sites, and any institution whose records may potentially be valuable to researchers, exhibitors, genealogists, or others. They can also work on the collections of a large family or even of an individual.

Archivists are often educators as well; it is not unusual for an archivist employed at a university or college to lecture in a subject related to their collection. Archivists employed at cultural institutions or for local government frequently design educational or outreach programs to further the ability of archive users to understand and access information in their collections. This might include such varied activities as exhibitions, promotional events, community engagement, or even media coverage.

The advent of Encoded Archival Description (EAD), along with increasing demand for materials to be made available online, has required archivists to become more tech-savvy in the past decade. Many archivists are now acquiring basic XML skills in order to make their finding aids available to researchers online.

== Skills ==
Because of the varied nature of the job within different organizations and work environments, archivists need to have a wide range of skills:

- Those who work in reference and access-oriented positions should have good customer services skills, to help patrons with their research.
- A basic knowledge of preservation is needed to help extend the life of cultural artifacts. Many types of media (such as photographs, acidic papers, and unstable copy processes) can deteriorate if not stored and maintained properly.
- Although many archival collections consist solely of paper records, increasingly archivists must confront the new challenges posed by the preservation of electronic records, so they need to be forward-looking and technologically proficient.

== Educational preparation ==
The educational preparation for archivists varies from country to country.

=== Australia ===
The Australian Society of Archivists is the professional body for archivists, and is responsible for the accreditation of the various University courses. The first University to offer archival training was the University of New South Wales, starting in 1973. The course closed in 2000.

As of 2017, courses are offered at Curtin University, Charles Sturt University, Monash University and University of South Australia at undergraduate and postgraduate levels. The course at Edith Cowan University is being phased out.

=== Brazil ===
The profession has been regulated since 1978.

Many universities in Brazil, such as the Federal University of Santa Maria (UFSM), the Federal University of Espírito Santo (UFES), Federal University of Amazonas (UFAM), and thirteen other universities, offer the degree in "archivology" which roughly translates to "archival science."

=== Canada ===
There are various institutions which offer an archival science degree. One of those institutions is the University of British Columbia.

=== Colombia ===
The Servicio Nacional de Aprendizaje – SENA – in chain training with the Tecnológico de Antioquia Tecnológico de Antioquia offers an archival science degree.

=== France ===
In France, the oldest Archivist School is the École des chartes, founded in 1821. This prestigious grande école (literally, "grand schools") offers a diploma in "Archivist-Paleography", created in 1849, after a three-year curriculum. Many graduates become curators in archives, museums, and libraries or become researchers in universities.

Some universities, like University of Angers, Jean Moulin University Lyon 3, and Versailles Saint-Quentin-en-Yvelines University, offer a master's degree in Archival Science, while the Burgundy has a course for their history degree focusing on archives of 20th and 21st century Europe.

=== Ireland ===
In the Republic of Ireland, the School of History of the University College Dublin (UCD) offers a Masters of Arts degree in Archives and Records Management, providing the only recognized course in Ireland for the training of professional archivists, which is accredited by the Archives and Records Association. UCD also offers certificates in Archives Management and Records Management.

=== New Zealand ===
Victoria University of Wellington is the only tertiary institution in New Zealand that provides postgraduate archival courses. Victoria Information Studies qualifications with ARCR endorsement have been recognized by Records and Information Management Professionals Australasia. The Open Polytechnic of New Zealand has an undergraduate course in archives management.

=== United Kingdom ===
In the United Kingdom, there are currently postgraduate courses in archives administration or management from Aberystwyth University, University of Dundee, University of Glasgow, University of Liverpool, and University College London (Note: The courses at Maynooth University were suspended for 2020/2021 term.) which are recognised by the Archives and Records Association (United Kingdom and Ireland). Students are expected to have relevant paid or voluntary work experience before obtaining a place on the UK courses, while professional certification (after qualifying) can be pursued via the Registration Scheme offered by the Archives and Records Association.

=== United States ===
The most common types of advanced degrees held by archivists are in archival science, public history, history, library science, or library and information science. It is also possible for archivists to earn a doctorate in library and information science. Archivists with a PhD often work as teaching faculty, deans, or directors of archival programs. In 2002, the Society of American Archivists published Guidelines for a Graduate Program in Archival Studies; it also promotes and disseminates a code of ethics, which has undergone several revisions since it was first adopted in 1980.

The Academy of Certified Archivists offers supplemental archival training by means of a certification program. When first established in 1989, some critics of ACA certification objected to its annual membership fees, the theoretical versus practical nature of its tests, and the need for members to re-certify every five years. However, in the decades since, it has been agreed that such requirements are comparable with certification programs in other professions, and that certification strengthens professional standards and individual competencies. While some positions in archives require certification and many employers view certification as preferred, it is not required by all employers in the United States. Approximately 1,200+ archivists were certified by ACA, as of 2016.

A history of women in the archival professions detailed the Committee on the Status of Women in the political, social and cultural context of feminism and its lasting effect on the field.

== Professional organizations and continuing education ==
Many archivists belong to a professional organization, such as the Society of American Archivists, the Association of Canadian Archivists, the Archives and Records Association (UK/Ireland), the Colombian College of Archivists - CCA, and the Australian Society of Archivists, as well as any number of local or regional associations. These organizations often provide ongoing educational opportunities to their members and other interested practitioners. In addition to formal degrees and or apprenticeships, many archivists take part in continuing education opportunities as available through professional associations and library school programs. New discoveries in the fields of media preservation and emerging technologies require continuing education as part of an archivist's job in order to stay current in the profession.

== History of the profession ==
The first predecessors of archival science in the West are Jacob von Rammingen's manuals of 1571. and Baldassarre Bonifacio's De Archivis libris singularis of 1632.

In 1883, French archivist Gabriel Richou published the first Western text on archival theory, entitled Traité théorique et pratique des archives publiques (Treaty of Theory and Practice of the Public Archives), in which he systematized the archival theory of the respect des fonds, first published by Natalis de Wailly in 1841.

In 1898, three Dutch archivists, Samuel Muller, Johan Feith, and Robert Fruin, published the Handleiding voor het ordenen en beschrijven van archieven (Manual for the Arrangement and Description of Archives). Produced for the Dutch Association of Archivists, it set out one hundred rules for archivists to base their work around. Notably, within these rules, the principle of preserving provenance and original order was first argued for as an essential trait of archival arrangement and description. Many of these principles were subsequently adopted and developed by the British archivist Hilary Jenkinson in his Manual of Archive Administration, first published in 1922, with a revised edition appearing in 1937.

In 1956, T. R. Schellenberg, known as the "Father of American Archival Appraisal", published Modern Archives. Schellenberg's work was intended to be an academic textbook defining archival methodology and giving archivists specific technical instruction on workflow and arrangement. Moving away from Jenkinson's organic and passive approach to archival acquisition, where the administrator decided what was kept and what was destroyed, Schellenberg argued for a more active approach by archivists to appraisal. His primary (administrative) and secondary (research) value model for the management and appraisal of records and archives allowed government archivists greater control over the influx of material that they faced after the Second World War. As a result of the widespread adoption of Schellenberg's methods, especially in the United States of America, modern Records Management as a separate but related discipline was born.

In 1972, Ernst Posner published Archives in the Ancient World. Posner's work emphasized that archives were not new inventions, but had existed in many different societies throughout recorded history. Due to his role in the development of American archival theory and practice, he was sometimes called "the Dean of American archivists." Norton promoted the establishment of archives as a profession separate from history or library science and developed the American archival tradition to emphasize an administrator/archivist rather than an historian/archivist. She encouraged learning through experimentation, practical usage, and community discussion. While editor of The American Archivist she emphasized technical rather than scholarly issues, believing that archival records were useful in ways other than scholarly research.

== On the Internet ==
=== Archives 2.0 ===
Archivists, like librarians, are taking advantage of Web 2.0 technologies such as blogs, wikis, as well as open access and open source philosophies. Archives 2.0, by extension, is more of a participatory online repository than a true-to-form established entity, although it has fallen considerably behind Web 2.0 in overall acceptance by archivists themselves. While Archives 2.0 may refer to implementing new technologies, it is also a way of engaging with archives in an effort to promote openness and flexibility of archival materials. This can be achieved through community participation in archives, archivists actively engaging with their collections, and promoting archival benefits in the modern world.

Kate Theimer writes that in order to understand Archives 2.0, it must be compared against Archives 1.0. She asserts that her representation of Archives 1.0 is by no means exhaustive or fully comprehensive of the breadth of archival experience. The following is a list of contrasts between 1.0 and 2.0.

- "Open, not closed;
- Transparent, not opaque;
- User centered, not record centered;
- Facilitator, not gatekeeper;
- Attracting new users, not relying on users to find them;
- Shared standards, not localized practice;
- Metrics and measurement, not 'unmeasurable' results;
- Iterative products, not 'perfect' products;
- Innovation and flexibility, not adhering to tradition;
- Technology savvy, not technology phobic;
- Value doing, not knowing;
- Confident about lobbying for resources, not hesitant beggars."

The technological tools of Archives 2.0 provide the foundational platforms to help the change from 1.0 to 2.0. When working in an archives that is dedicated to upholding 2.0 standards, the focus has shifted onto the user experience at an archives.

=== Internet libraries ===
Some archivists operate public libraries that are accessible on the Internet. Examples include the illegal shadow libraries Library Genesis and Anna's Archive – humanity's largest library of books – and Sci-Hub – humanity's largest public library of scientific articles. Proponents of these libraries have made use of BitTorrent and IPFS technologies to make these sites decentralized, resilient and uncensorable. There are also other projects that for instance archive digital games and make them accessible via the Internet or that keep content of defunct websites accessible.

The most comprehensive public archive on the Internet is the Internet Archive which provides free public access to collections of digitized materials, including websites (via the Wayback Machine), software applications/games, music, movies/videos, moving images, and books. As of September 2023, the Internet Archive holds over 39 million books and texts, 13.6 million movies, videos and TV shows, 1 million software programs, 15 million audio files, 4.7 million images, and 840 billion web pages.

== See also ==
- Archival science
- List of archives
- List of archivists
- Howard Henry Peckham and John Clement Fitzpatrick (archivists of early American history)
- The Archivist, novel
