= Respect des fonds =

Principle in modern archival science

Respect des fonds, or le respect pour les fonds, is a principle in archival theory that proposes to group collections of archival records according to their fonds (according to the entity by which they were created or from which they were received). It is one of several principles stemming from provenance that have guided archival arrangement and description from the late 19th century until the present day. It is similar to archival integrity, which dictates that "a body of records resulting from the same activity must be preserved as a group." It is also closely related to the idea of original order – the idea that archivists ought to maintain records using the creator's organizational system. However, respect des fonds differs from that other foundational sub-principle of original order in its concern with the integrity of the collection or record group as a whole rather than the organization of materials within that collection or record group.

== Origins ==
Most archivists believe respect des fonds originated from the circular titled "Instructions pour la mise en ordre et le classement des archives departementales" (commonly known as "Circular No. 14") issued by the French Ministry of the Interior on 24 April 1841 and authored by Natalis de Wailly, head of the Administrative Section of the Archives nationales; although Luciana Duranti has found evidence of the principle in Naples three decades earlier. Wailly's circular instructed archivists "to assemble the different documents by fonds, that is to say, to form a collection of all the documents which originate from a body, an organization, a family, or an individual, and to arrange the different fonds according to a certain order." The principle became more widely adopted in 1839 because of regulations issued by the French minister of public instruction. At this stage it did not necessarily imply respect de l’ordre intérieur or original order, as the French were in the habit of organizing within fonds by year, subject matter, relevancy, or some other system. It was only upon the establishment of German Provenienzprinzip (or provenance) through regulation emanating from the Prussian State Archives in 1881, which dictated that the archivist should maintain both the integrity of the fonds and the Registraturprinzip or original order of those same records, that both principles came to be regarded as pillars of archival processing. Later respect des fonds was promoted in the widely influential Manual for the Arrangement and Description of Archives (also known as The Dutch Manual) in 1898. It was further codified by ratification at the First International Congress of Archivists and Librarians meeting in Brussels in 1910, and featured prominently in the work of eminent British archivist Sir Hilary Jenkinson, who described it as "[t]he most important of all principles of Archive Management."

== Interpretation ==
While respect des fonds is generally considered a core concept of the archival enterprise, some critics have noted both the historical contingency of its creation and also the impracticality of its execution. Critics claim that respect des fonds arose from the need to find a simplistic method for novice archivists to manage a growing volume of archival materials. Created for government papers and then widely applied to all kinds of archival materials, the principle does not always transfer well to other settings, especially personal papers. Even when applied only to government records problems surface; fonds do not always reflect the nature and use of the documents they contain, especially if the documents were used by multiple agencies. Although both stem from a desire to best reflect provenance, there is a natural tension between fonds and original order, since records managers might destroy fonds in order to create a usable management system. Archival procedures have been subject to critique from post-structural and post-colonial thinkers, who observe the ways in which power dictates methods of arranging and describing materials. Despite such criticisms, the recent revolution in archival workflow motivated by Greene and Meissner's "More Product, Less Process" seeks to maintain the fonds, and amplifies it by de-prioritizing detailed processing. More recent work has searched for alternate models and methods, but these remain largely conceptual.

Between the 1930s and 1950s, the principles of respect des fonds and archival integrity were repeatedly debated in the context of the work of the Records Preservation Section of the British Records Association (a rescue service for archival material), in regard to the ethical implications of splitting related groups of documents between different archive repositories.

== See also ==
- Archival bond
