= Association of Canadian Archivists =

Not-for-profit professional organization

- Abbreviation: ACA
- Formation: 1975
- Type: Nonprofit
- Legal status: Active
- Purpose: The advancement of the Canadian archival sector.
- Headquarters: Ottawa, Ontario, Canada
- Region served: National
- Members: Over 800 archivists and organizations
- President: Alyssa Hyduk
- Staff: 2 FTEs
- Website: https://archivists.ca/

The Association of Canadian Archivists (ACA), established in 1975, is a national not-for-profit organization representing over 600 archivists (and those interested in archives and archivists) in Canada. With headquarters in Ottawa, the ACA's mandate is to provide leadership to the archival profession and to increase an understanding and appreciation of Canada's archival heritage.

The ACA evolved from the Archives Section of the Canadian Historical Association. For many years it held its annual conference together with other scholarly groups as part of the Congress of the Canadian Federation for the Humanities and Social Sciences (formerly the "Learneds").

== Mission ==
The mission of the ACA is to provide strong and diversified professional leadership and support to the Canadian archival community in the following areas: advocacy; communications; governance; public awareness; and education, research, professional standards and best practices. It does so by:

- Providing leadership for everyone engaged in the preservation of Canada's Documentary Heritage
- Encouraging awareness of archival activities and developments and the importance of archives to modern society
- Advocating the interests and needs of professional archivists before government and other regulatory agencies
- Communicating to further the understanding and cooperation amongst members of the Canadian archival system, and other information and culture based professions.
- Developing, supporting and delivering initiatives and tools to increase public awareness of archives.

== Activities ==
Historically, the ACA produced "Guidelines Toward a Curriculum for a Master's Degree in Archival Science" prepared by Hugh Taylor and Edwin Welch in 1976. These were followed by "Guidelines for the Development of a two-year Curriculum for a Master of Archival Studies" in 1990. In the same year, the ACA collaborated with the Canadian archival community in the development and publication of Canadian archival standards for description, the Rules for Archival Description.

Ongoing ACA activities include: the production of a quarterly newsletter (ACA Bulletin) and a bi-annual scholarly journal (Archivaria); a publications program for monographs and occasional papers; an archival professional development program; a mentorship program; awards for excellence in writing and research and for contributions to the Canadian archival community; and an annual conference, with meetings and workshops. The ACA has a formal constitution and a Code of Ethics. More recently, the ACA posted the entire collection of Archivaria and its predecessor, The Canadian Archivist, to the web, much of which is freely publicly accessible.

Various committees provide support and direction on a variety of archival issues such as Outreach and Professional Learning. In addition, members are appointed to represent the association to address specific issues such as the release of Canadian censuses and the English Commission on the former National Archives of Canada. There also Special Interest Sections (SIS) that allow members interested in particular types of records or who work in a particular kind of archives to get together with others with a similar interest. These SISes include: Indigenous Archives (SISAA); Access and Privacy (APSIS); Climate Records and Information (CRISIS); Government Records (GRSIS); Municipal Archives (MASIS); Personal Archives (SISPA); Religious Archives (RASIS); Social Justice (SJSIS); Technology and Archives (TaASIS); and University and College Archives (UCASIS). TaASIS runs the popular Archives and Technology Unconference (TAATU) in conjunction with the ACA's annual conference. The ACA also has several student chapters located at Canadian universities that offer graduate programs with an archival studies component. Student chapters are located at Dalhousie University, McGill University, the University of British Columbia Student Chapter and the University of Toronto.

A companion organization, the Association of Canadian Archivists Foundation, raises and grants funds to support the educational and research needs of the Canadian archival profession.

== Past Boards of Directors ==
Date	President	Vice President	Secretary	Treasurer	Director Without Portfolio
1975–1976	Gordon Dodds	Linda Johnson	Stan Hanson	Valerie Cowan	Marcel Caya
1976–1977	Linda Johnson	David Rudkin	Kenneth Johnson	Valerie Cowan	Douglas Cass
1977–1978	David Rudkin	Terry Eastwood	Jay Atherton	Jean Dryden	John Bovey
1978–1979	Terry Eastwood	Marion Beyea	Brian Corbett	Jean Dryden	John Bovey
1979–1980	Marion Beyea	Kent Haworth	Carman Carroll	Jean Tener	Trevor Powell
1980–1981	Kent Haworth	Jane Nokes	Carman Carroll	Jean Tener	Trevor Powell
1981–1982	Jane Nokes	Anne MacDermaid	William Smith	Miriam McTiernan	George Brandak
1982–1983	Anne MacDermaid	Barbara Craig	William Smith	Miriam McTiernan	George Brandak
1983–1984	Barbara Craig	Miriam McTiernan	Patricia Townsend	Flora Unter	David Leonard
1984–1985	Miriam McTiernan	Robert Morgan	Patricia Townsend	Terry Thompson	David Leonard
1985–1986	Robert Morgan	Jean Dryden	Brian Owens	Terry Thompson	Christine Ardern
1986–1987	Jean Dryden	Colleen Dempsey	Brian Owens	Terry Thompson	Christine Ardern
1987–1988	Colleen Dempsey	Burton Glendenning	Brian Owens	Catherine Shepard	Stan Hanson
1988–1989	Burton Glendenning	Jay Atherton	Keith Stotyn	Catherine Shepard	Diane Chisholm

Date	President	Vicepresident	Secretary/Treasurer	Director Without Portfolio
1989–1990	Jay Atherton	George Brandak	Keith Stotyn	Diane Chisholm
1990–1991	George Brandak	Michael Moosberger	Keith Stotyn	Diane Chisolm
1991–1992	Michael Moosburger	Garron Wells	Keith Stotyn	Jerry O'Brien
1992–1993	Garron Wells	Ian Forsyth	Marie-Louise Perron	Jerry O'Brien
1993–1994	Ian Forsyth	Antonio Lechasseur	Marie-Louise Perron	Sam Kula
1994–1995	Antonio Lechasseur	Bernadine Dodge	Duane Mombourquette	Sam Kula
1995–1996	Bernadine Dodge	Terry Thompson	Duane Mombourquette	Jane Turner
1996–1997	Terry Thompson	Lois Yorke	Patrick Burden	Jane Turner
1997–1998	Lois Yorke	Corrado Santoro	Patrick Burden	Susan Hart
1998–1999	Shelley Sweeney	Corrado Santoro	Jo-Ann Munn Gafuik	Susan Hart
1999–2000	Shelley Sweeney	Ian Moir	Jo-Ann Munn Gafuik	Lisa Russell
2000–2001	Bryan Corbett	Ian Moir	Janet McMaster	Lisa Russell
2001–2002	Bryan Corbett	Matt Szybalski	Janet McMaster	Johanna Smith
2002–2003	Bryan Corbett	Matt Szybalski	Judith Roberts-Moore	Johanna Smith
2003–2004	Jerry O'Brien	Larry Dohey	Judith Roberts-Moore	Wayne Crockett
2004–2005	Marc Lerman	Larry Dohey	Scott Goodine	Wayne Crockett
2005–2006	Marc Lerman	Linda Fraser	Scott Goodine	Loryl MacDonald
2006–2007	Scott Goodine	Linda Fraser	Heather Home	Loryl MacDonald
2007	Scott Goodine	Linda Fraser	Heather Home	Loryl MacDonald

Date	President	Vice President	Secretary-Treasurer	Director-at-Large
2008	Scott Goodine	Loryl MacDonald	Heather Home	Charlotte Woodley
2009	Paul Banfield	Rodney Carter	Michele Dale	Heather Pitcher
2010	Paul Banfield	Rodney Carter	Michele Dale	Heather Pitcher
2011	Loryl MacDonald	Rodney Carter	Deirdre Bryden	Heather Pitcher
2012	Loryl MacDonald	Michael Gourlie	Deirdre Bryden	Heather Beattie
2013	Loryl MacDonald	Michael Gourlie	Karen Buckley	Heather Beattie Scott Goodine
2014	Loryl MacDonald	Michael Gourlie	Karen Buckley	Heather Beattie Scott Goodine

Date	President	Vice President	Secretary	Treasurer	Director-at-Large	Director-at-Large
2015	Kathryn Harvey	Michael Gourlie	Karen Buckley	Jenn Roberts	Heather Beattie	Ian Burnett
2016	Kathryn Harvey	Jordan Bass	Patti Harper	Jenn Roberts	Krisztina Laszlo	Ian Burnett
2017	Luciana Duranti	Jordan Bass	Patti Harper	Chris Trainor	Krisztina Laszlo	Amanda Tomé

Date	President	Vice President	Secretary	Treasurer	Director-at-Large	Director-at-Large	Director, General Editor of Archivaria
2018	Luciana Duranti	Rebecka Sheffield	Jane Morrison	Chris Trainor	Jennifer Mohan	Suher Zaher-Mazawi	Jennifer Douglas
2019	Loryl MacDonald	Rebecka Sheffield	Jane Morrison	Jonathan Dorey	Jennifer Mohan	Luciana Duranti	Jennifer Douglas
2020	Loryl MacDonald	Rebecka Sheffield	Jane Morrison	Jonathan Dorey	Luciana Duranti	Jeremy Heil	Fiorella Foscarini

Date	President	Vice President	Secretary	Treasurer	Directors-at-Large
2021–2022	Erica Hernández-Read	Anna Gibson-Hollow	Kaitlin Normandin	Andrea McCutcheon Kyle Pugh	Andrew Chernevych Gillian Dunks John Richan James Roussain
2023-2024	Erica Hernández-Read	Angela Fornelli	Alexandra Mills	Kyle Pugh	Andrew Chernevych John RichanAmanda Oliver
2024-2025	Anna Gibson-Hollow	Angela Fornelli	Alexandra Mills	Kyle Pugh	John Richan Adam Williamson Amanda Oliver

== See also ==
- Archives Association of Ontario
- Association for Manitoba Archives
