= Shelley Sweeney =

Canadian archivist (born 1959)

- Born: 1959 (age 66–67)
- Education: Alberni District Secondary School
- Alma mater: University of British Columbia
- Occupation: Archivist
- Writing career
- Language: English

Shelley Sweeney (born 1959) is a Canadian archivist. She was university archivist at the University of Regina from 1983 to 1998, and the head of the University of Manitoba Archives & Special Collections from 1998 to 2020. She helped found two regional archival organizations, the Saskatchewan Council of Archives and the Saskatchewan Archivists Society, and the University and Research Institutions section of the International Council on Archives. Sweeney is a charter member of the Academy of Certified Archivists and, with colleagues, wrote the first code of ethics for the Canadian archival profession.

== Education ==
Sweeney graduated from Alberni District Secondary School in 1977 and subsequently received a Bachelor of Arts in Latin from the University of British Columbia in 1981. She was among the original ten students to enter the first dedicated two-year Master's of Archival Studies program in North America at the University of British Columbia, receiving her master's degree in 1985. Her thesis was entitled: "A Comparative Study of the Record Keeping Practices of the Anglican, Baptist, and United Churches in British Columbia." She studied under archival theorists Terry Eastwood and Hugh Taylor. At this time she completed an internship in the National Photography Section of the Public Archives of Canada in Ottawa, Ontario in 1982.

Sweeney was one of the first graduates to receive a Doctor of Philosophy degree with an emphasis in Archival Enterprise from the University of Texas at Austin in 2002, having taken a two-year educational leave from the University of Regina from 1995 to 1997 in order to complete course work. She studied under David B. Gracy II. Her dissertation was entitled: "The Source-Seeking Cognitive Processes and Behaviour of the In-Person Archival Researcher."

== Career ==
Upon completion of classwork for her master's degree, Sweeney accepted a position as University Archivist at the University of Regina, which position she held from 1983 to 1998. She was appointed Head of the University of Manitoba Archives in 1998 and, subsequently, Coordinator of FIPPA (Freedom of Information and Protection of Privacy Act) and later, PHIA (Personal Health Information Act) for the university. Responsibility for these two additional portfolios ended when the university's organizational structure shifted the FIPPA Office to the vice-president administration in 2008.

At the University of Manitoba Archives, Sweeney devoted a great deal of energy to "expand, make accessible and promote the collections that document Spiritualism and psychical research in Canada," concentrating in particular on the Hamilton Family fonds.

From 2009 to 2012 Sweeney was on the bid committee that proposed to steward the archives of the national Truth and Reconciliation Commission once the Commission had wrapped up its work. Once the bid was successful, she was appointed co-chair with Deborah Young to the Implementation Committee for the proposed National Centre for Truth and Reconciliation from 2013 to 2014, and was a member of the leadership team from 2014 to 2015. This led Sweeney to begin the process of indigenizing the University of Manitoba Archives.

Sweeney taught sections on description, outreach, and advocacy and provided support by examining theses and supervising interns for the Master's of Archival Studies program in the history department at the University of Manitoba. Upon retirement, Sweeney was appointed Senior Scholar and then in 2021 was made Librarian (Archivist) Emerita.

== Professional activities ==
Sweeney was editor of the ACA (Association of Canadian Archivists) Bulletin from 1985 to 1987 and president of the Association of Canadian Archivists from 1998 to 2000, among other positions in that organization. She was the principal author of the first Code of Ethics for the Canadian archival profession. She was made a Fellow by the ACA in 2011. She served as Secretary of the international Academy of Certified Archivists from 2003 to 2005. She helped found the Saskatchewan Council of Archives and Archivists in 1986, the Saskatchewan Archivists Society in 1988 (now the Saskatchewan Council for Archives and Archivists), and the Section on University and Research Institution Archives (SUV) of the International Council on Archives in 1992. She served as Secretary of the Academy of Certified Archivists from 2003 to 2005. From 2006 to 2008, she was secretary general of the Bureau of Canadian Archivists, appointed by the ACA and representing Canadian archival professional interests abroad. She was appointed the ACA representative on the Sectoral Committee of the Canadian Commission for UNESCO in 2009. She presented papers at many conferences in Canada and around the world and has published widely on a number of topics.

== Recognition ==
In 2011, Sweeney was made a Fellow by the Association of Canadian Archivists. In the same year, she was awarded a 50th Anniversary Alumni Service and Leadership Award from the School of Library, Archival and Information Studies at the University of British Columbia in recognition of her support of the program and her work as a role model in the field.

In addition to supporting the Master's of Archival Studies program, Sweeney was chosen as one of 25 career mentors to represent the University of Manitoba Career Mentor Program's over 700 volunteers for the program's 25th anniversary.

Of her writing, Edward Goedeken noted that Sweeney's article on provenance for "Libraries & Culture" was one of the six most cited articles of the period 2006 to 2011.

Upon her retirement, colleagues Walter Meyer zu Erpen and Tom Nesmith stated: "Throughout her career, she has been one of the most prominent Canadian advocates for archives, including through many media interviews and leadership roles in the Association of Canadian Archivists... and in other archival organizations, several of which she helped found." President of the Association of Canadian Archivists Loryl MacDonald stated that Sweeney was "truly a role model for all archivists." In 2022, Sweeney received the Queen Elizabeth II Platinum Jubilee Medal for service from the Province of Manitoba.

== Selected bibliography ==
- With Esyllt W. Jones, Ian Milligan, Greg Bak, and J.M. McCutcheon, "Remembering is a Form of Honouring: Preserving the COVID-19 Archival Record," Royal Society of Canada, February 2021.
- With Cheryl Avery, "The North-South Attraction: Forging New Relationships between Indigenous Peoples in the Arctic and Archives in the South," in Library and Information Studies for Arctic Social Sciences and Humanities, ed. Spencer Acadia and Marthe Fjellestad. (Abingdon, UK: Routledge, forthcoming).
- "Academic Archivists as Agents for Change," Comma: International Journal on Archives. 2018, 1–2 (2020): 65–75.
- "Chapter 29: Primary and Archival Sources," in Reference and Information Services: An Introduction, ed. Linda Smith and Melissa Wong, 6th ed. (Santa Barbara, CA: ABC-CLIO, 2020). ISBN 9781440868832.
- "Provenance of Archival Materials," in Encyclopedia of Library and Information Sciences, ed. John D. McDonald and Michael Levine-Clark, 4th ed. (Boca Raton: CRC Press/Taylor & Francis, 2017). ISBN 9780367570101.
- With Cheryl Avery, "Discombobulated Remnants?: Preserving LGBTTTIQ Histories," in Finding Directions West: Readings that Locate and Dislocate Western Canada's Past, ed. George Colpitts and Heather Devine (Calgary: University of Calgary Press, 2017): 39–57. ISBN 9781552388808.
- "Chapter 26: Primary and Archival Sources," in Reference and Information Services: An Introduction, ed. Linda Smith and Melissa Wong, 5th ed. (Santa Barbara, CA: ABC-CLIO, 2016). ISBN 9781440836961.
- "Weaving the Web of Influence: Maximizing Archival Appraisal and Acquisition through the Use of 'Spider Advocates'" in Appraisal & Acquisition: Innovative Practices for Archives and Special Collections, ed. Kate Theimer (Lanham, Maryland: Rowman & Littlefield, 2015), pp. 135–50. ISBN 978-1-4422-4953-0.
- "Moved by the Spirit: Opportunistic Promotion of the Hamilton Family Séance Collection," in Outreach: Innovative Practices for Archives and Special Collections, ed. Kate Theimer (Lanham, Maryland: Rowman & Littlefield, 2014), pp. 17–33. ISBN 9780810890978.
- "Lady Sings the Blues: the Public Funding of Archives, Libraries and Museums in Canada," in Better off Forgetting? Essays on Archives, Public Policy, and Collective Memory, ed. Cheryl Avery and Mona Holmlund, (Toronto: University of Toronto Press, 2010). ISBN 9781442610804.
- "Special Delivery: Getting the Message Out about Archives in North America," Comma: International Journal on Archives. (2009): 151–56.
- "Provenance of Archival Materials," in Encyclopedia of Library and Information Science ed. Marcia J. Bates and Mary Niles Maack, 3rd ed. (Boca Raton: CRC Press, 2009). ISBN 9780203757635.
- "The Ambiguous Origins of the Archival Principle of 'Provenance,'" Libraries & the Cultural Record. 43, 2 (2008): 193–213.
- "Andrew Suknaski," The Encyclopedia of Saskatchewan. Regina: Canadian Plains Research Centre, 2005.
- "Merging or Diverging?: The Creation of the Information Superprofessional," Archifacts. [New Zealand] (December 2001): ??.
- With Jan Horner and Carol Budnick, "Manitoba Borders: Women Writing Over the Line: A Historical Overview of Ten Manitoba Women Writers"/Frontieres Manitobaines: Des Excrivaines Qui Ont Franchi La Ligne," Manitoba Women's Directorate, 2000.
- With Lois Yorke, "The Bright Promise: A Commentary on the National Archives of Canada and the English Report One Year After the Appointment of the National Archivist of Canada," Association of Canadian Archivists, 2000.
- "Ethics Wrangling in Canada: Or, Is It Ethical to Argue with the Ethics Committee?" New Zealand Archivist. II, no.4 (Summer/December 1991): 13.
- "An Act of Faith: Access to Religious Records in English Canada," Archivaria. 30 (Summer 1990): 42–54.
- "Sheep That Have Gone Astray?: Church Record Keeping and the Canadian Archival System," Archivaria. 23 (Winter 1986/87): 54–68.
- "A Guinea Pig's Perspective on the UBC Master of Archival Studies Programme," Archivaria. 18 (Summer 1984): 263–67.
