= Hilary Jenkinson =

British archivist (1882–1961)

Sir Hilary Jenkinson CBE FSA FRHistS
- Hilary Jenkinson, 1949
- Born: 1 November 1882; Streatham, London, England
- Died: 5 March 1961 (aged 78); London, England
- Resting place: Horsham, Sussex
- Education: Dulwich College
- Alma mater: Pembroke College, Cambridge
- Occupation: Archivist
- Spouse: Alice Violet
- Parent: William Wilberforce Jenkinson Alice Leigh Bedale

Sir Charles Hilary Jenkinson CBE FSA FRHistS (1 November 1882 – 5 March 1961) was a British archivist and archival theorist, regarded as the figure most responsible for bringing continental European concepts of archival theory to the English-speaking world.

== Early life, education and military service ==
Born in Streatham, London, Jenkinson was the son of William Wilberforce Jenkinson, a land agent, and Alice Leigh Bedale. He was educated at Dulwich College and Pembroke College, Cambridge, graduating with first class honours in Classics in 1904.

During the First World War, he joined the Royal Garrison Artillery, and served in France and Belgium from 1916 to 1918.

== Career ==
In 1906, Jenkinson joined the staff of the Public Record Office and worked on the arrangement and classification of the records of the medieval Exchequer. In 1912, he was put in charge of the search room, which he then reorganised in response to criticisms made in the first report of the Royal Commission on Public Records. After his military service, he worked at the War Office until 1920.

Returning to the Public Record Office, he reorganised the repairing department and later the repository, to which he moved in 1929. He was appointed secretary and principal assistant keeper in 1938.

During 1944 and 1945, he paid several extended visits to Italy, Germany, and Malta as War Office Adviser on Archives, attached to the Monuments, Fine Arts, and Archives Subcommission, playing an important role in archives protection in those countries from the worst of the depredations of war. In 1947, Jenkinson, along with H. E. Bell, advocated the protection and preservation of a country's archives, even during times of war, so that the "sanctity of evidence" may be preserved in the records.

From 1947 until his retirement in 1954, Jenkinson served as the deputy keeper (chief executive officer) of the repository at the Public Record Office. During this tenure, he was instrumental in acquiring more facilities in Ashridge, Hertfordshire as further records storage, and facilities in Hayes, Middlesex to serve as temporary housing for records in the process of being transferred to the Public Record Office.

=== Extramural activities ===
Jenkinson lectured on palaeography, diplomatic, and archives in Cambridge, and at King's College London and University College, London. He wrote a number of books on palaeography and diplomatic, and his Manual of Archive Administration (1922; revised edition 1937) became a highly influential work on archival practice in Britain and Ireland.

He served as Honorary Secretary of the Surrey Archaeological Society. He took a leading part in establishing its daughter organisation, the Surrey Record Society, in 1912; and thereafter, as secretary and general editor until 1950, in establishing its principles of editing and records publication. He was a founder (1932), Joint Honorary Secretary (1932–47) and Vice-President (1954–61) of the British Records Association; President of the Jewish Historical Society of England (1953–55); and President of the Society of Archivists (1955–61). He also played an important role in the setting up of the National Register of Archives in 1945.

He served as the British representative on the UNESCO committee convened in 1948 to establish an International Council on Archives, later becoming a vice-president of the Council.

== Archival theory ==
Jenkinson's Manual of Archive Administration was first published in 1922, and republished in a second edition (revised and expanded, but not significantly altered in its principles) in 1937. It was reissued with a new introduction by Roger Ellis in 1965. The book is described by John Ridener as "one of the most widely recognized treatises on the theory of archives and archival work" for introducing continental archival concepts to Britain (and the English-speaking world), along with his own original interpretations. For example, Jenkinson rejected the practice of accepting singular documents into an archive, as well as the acceptance of private papers, which he considered to be a flaw of the French and Belgian philosophies. However, Margaret Procter argues that despite Jenkinson's "iconic" status, his work also rested to a considerable degree on an existing British theoretical tradition.

Key elements in Jenkinson's archival theory included the following:

- The objectivity of the archival record
- The principle of provenance
- Le respect pour les fonds and the significance of the inter-relatedness of records
- The organic nature of archival records in creation, preservation, and relationship with other records
- Necessity of continual custody and control of archival records in order to retain significance
- The archivist as impartial custodian: Jenkinson believed that archival appraisal (including the weeding-out and destruction of unimportant records) was not the responsibility of archivists, but of record creators, to be undertaken before the records were transferred to the archive. He emphasised that the archivist is not an analyst of content, but a conservator of any relevant evidence for those who do wish to consult the records.

Jenkinson saw "the good Archivist" as "perhaps the most selfless devotee of Truth the modern world produces". "His Creed, the Sanctity of Evidence; his Task, the Conservation of every Scrap of Evidence attaching to the Documents committed to his charge; his Aim, to provide, without prejudice or afterthought, for all who wish to know the Means of Knowledge." He further reaffirmed this position by designating the archivist as being a "profession of faith," a serious professional that is uncompromising in their duty.

== Disputes with T. R. Schellenberg ==
Jenkinson had a number of theoretical differences of opinion with T. R. Schellenberg, his American counterpart, particularly over the question of the archivist's role in appraisal and selection. John Ridener ascribes their differences in outlook to the fact that, in contrast to Schellenberg's concern with modern records management, Jenkinson's theory was founded on "medieval record structures", and was unsuited to dealing with the increased bulk of modern records. To Schellenberg, it was a matter of quality in the archives. Having an undisturbed and impartial bulk in appraisal and accession does not, in his philosophy, serve the main purpose of the modern archives: making available useful material to patrons. Some records have higher evidentiary value, while others fall short on worth, making the former more desirable for preservation. Schellenberg desired a forward-thinking practicality in the approach to archival appraisal that took into consideration the needs of future patrons (in stark contrast to Jenkinson's conservative approach), while maintaining Jenkinson's notions of record relatedness, evidentiary value, and "truth" in archival holdings.

In a private letter, Schellenberg dismissed Jenkinson as "an old fossil".

== Criticism ==
Jenkinson's greatest influence on archival theory and practice emerged from his publications, teaching and other activities undertaken in a personal capacity, and undertaken to a great degree early in his career. By contrast, in his professional career at the Public Record Office, and in particular as Deputy Keeper from 1947 to 1954, he was often seen as an autocratic and inflexible conservative. Elizabeth Shepherd comments that "it was only after his retirement that the PRO could finally develop a professional archival approach to its work", as Jenkinson did not like individual interpretations or differing viewpoints of his philosophy.

Within the archival profession, Jenkinson's core tenets regarding the objectivity of archives and the archivist as neutral custodian have undergone considerable criticism and revision in recent years. Writing in 1997, Terry Cook commented: "At its most extreme, Jenkinson's approach would allow the archival legacy to be perverted by administrative whim or state ideology, as in the former Soviet Union, where provenance was undermined by the establishment of one state fonds and archival records attained value solely by the degree to which they reflected the 'official' view of history."

== Honours ==
Jenkinson was appointed CBE in 1943 and knighted in 1949. As well as being a member of the Society of Archivists of Great Britain, he was an honorary member of the Society of American Archivists. He was granted an honorary fellowship at University College, London, and an honorary LLD at the University of Aberdeen.

== Personal life ==
Jenkinson married Alice Violet Rickards in 1910. She died in 1960. Jenkinson died a year later on 5 March 1961 at St Thomas' Hospital, London. They had no children.

== Legacy ==
After his death, Oliver W. Holmes wrote in the American Archivist that Jenkinson's work had become a reference source for all inexperienced staff; he described him as, "almost certainly, the most eminent archivist of his generation in the English-speaking world". Writing in 1980, Roger Ellis and Peter Walne commented that "[n]o one man had more influence on the establishment of the profession of archivist in Great Britain than Sir Hilary Jenkinson". Terry Eastwood in 2003 called Jenkinson "one of the most influential archivists in the English-speaking world".

Jenkinson influenced University College, London's decision to establish an archives diploma course, and would later present its first lecture. Such a course provided advancement towards his desire for the scientific archival profession to advance beyond the Public Record Office, and to train a new generation of archivists in his English method. Since 2007, the Department of Information Studies at University College London has hosted an annual Jenkinson Lecture named in honour of Sir Hilary. The series was established to mark the sixtieth anniversary of archival education at UCL.

== Principal publications ==
- English Court Hand, A.D. 1066 to 1500, with Charles Johnson (Oxford: Clarendon Press, 1915)
- Palaeography and the Practical Study of Court Hand (Cambridge: Cambridge University Press, 1915)
- A Manual of Archive Administration (Oxford: Clarendon Press, 1922; revised edition 1937, reissued 1965)
  - 1922 edition via the Internet Archive
  - 1937 edition via the Internet Archive
- Elizabethan Handwritings: a preliminary sketch (London: Oxford University Press/Bibliographical Society, 1922)
- The Later Court Hands in England from the Fifteenth to the Seventeenth Century, 2 vols (Cambridge: Cambridge University Press, 1927)
- The English Archivist: a new profession (London: H. K. Lewis & Co. Ltd., 1948)
- A Guide to Seals in the Public Record Office (London: HMSO, 1954; second edition 1968)
- Selected Writings of Sir Hilary Jenkinson, ed. Roger H. Ellis & Peter Walne (Gloucester: Alan Sutton, 1980; reissue (with a new introduction) 2003)

A fuller bibliography of Jenkinson's writings to 1956 appears as:

- Ellis, Roger; Kellaway, William (1957). "A Bibliography of the Writings of Sir Hilary Jenkinson". In Davies, J. Conway (ed.). Studies presented to Sir Hilary Jenkinson, C.B.E., LL.D, F.S.A. London: Oxford University Press. pp. 480–94.

Festschrifts

- Davies, J. Conway, ed. (1957). Studies presented to Sir Hilary Jenkinson, C.B.E., LL.D, F.S.A. London: Oxford University Press.
- Hollaender, Albert E. J., ed. (1962). Essays in Memory of Sir Hilary Jenkinson. Chichester: Society of Archivists.

== Bibliography ==
- Bell, H. E. (1962). "Archivist itinerant: Jenkinson in wartime Italy". In Hollaender, Albert E. J. (ed.). Essays in Memory of Sir Hilary Jenkinson. Chichester: Society of Archivists. pp. 167–77.
- Bell, H. E.; Jenkinson, Hilary (1947). Italian Archives During the War and at Its Close. British Committee on the Preservation and Restitution of Works of Art, Archives and Other Material in Enemy Hands. London: HMSO.
- Cantwell, John D. (1991). The Public Record Office, 1838–1958. London: HMSO. pp. 397–507. ISBN 0114402248.
- Eastwood, Terence M. (2003). "Introduction to the 2003 reissue". In Ellis, Roger H.; Walne, Peter (eds.). Selected Writings of Sir Hilary Jenkinson. Chicago: The Society of American Archivists. pp. vii–xx. ISBN 1-931666-03-2.
- Ellis, Roger H. (1971). "Recollections of Sir Hilary Jenkinson". Journal of the Society of Archivists. 4 (4): 261–75. doi:10.1080/00379817109513966.
- Ellis, Roger H.; Walne, Peter, eds. (1980). Selected Writings of Sir Hilary Jenkinson. Stroud: Alan Sutton. ISBN 0-904387-52-6.
- Holmes, Oliver W. (1961). "Sir Hilary Jenkinson, 1882–1961". The American Archivist. 24 (3): 345–7. doi:10.17723/aarc.24.3.e521g515xp0n60u1. JSTOR 40290906.
- [Johnson, H. C.] (1957). "Memoir of Sir Hilary Jenkinson". In Davies, J. Conway (ed.). Studies presented to Sir Hilary Jenkinson, C.B.E., LL.D, F.S.A. London: Oxford University Press. pp. xiii–xxx.
- Johnson, H. C.; Brodie, Marc (reviser) (2008) [2004]. "Jenkinson, Sir (Charles) Hilary (1882–1961)". Oxford Dictionary of National Biography (online ed.). Oxford University Press. doi:10.1093/ref:odnb/34177. (Subscription, Wikipedia Library access or UK public library membership required.)
- Ridener, John (2009). From Polders to Postmodernism: a concise history of archival theory. Duluth, Minnesota: Litwin Books. pp. 41–68.
- Tschan, Reto (2002). "A comparison of Jenkinson and Schellenberg on appraisal". The American Archivist. 65 (2): 176–195. doi:10.17723/aarc.65.2.920w65g3217706l1.
