= InterPARES Project =

The International Research on Permanent Authentic Records in Electronic Systems (InterPARES Project) is a "major international research initiative in which archival scholars, computer engineering scholars, national archival institutions and private industry representatives are collaborating to develop the theoretical and methodological knowledge required for the permanent preservation of authentic records created in electronic systems." As a global consortia that works to develop preservation strategies, the project focuses on "developing the knowledge essential to the long-term preservation of authentic records created and/or maintained in digital form and providing the basis for standards, policies, strategies and plans of action capable of ensuring the longevity of such material and the ability of its users to trust its authenticity."

The InterPARES Project was initiated in 1999 by Professor Luciana Duranti at the School of Library, Archival and Information Studies (since 2020, School of Information), at the University of British Columbia, in Vancouver, British Columbia, Canada. Employing an interdisciplinary and multidisciplinary approach, the project has relied on the principles of “interdisciplinarity, transferability, open inquiry, and multimethod design” and has utilized a variety of methodologies, including case studies, surveys, prototyping, diplomatic and archival analysis, text analysis, statistical analysis, digital forensics, and visual analysis.

The Project developed in four phases, each focusing on key issues regarding the authenticity, reliability, and accuracy of records. Phase 1 (1999-2001) centered on the long-term preservation of records created and maintained in databases and document management systems. Phase 2 (2002-2007) focused on records produced in dynamic and interactive systems in the course of scientific, artistic, and governmental activities. Phase 3 (2007-2012) concentrated on the application of findings from the first two phases in small to medium-sized archival institutions. Phase 4 (2013-2018) focused on digital records entrusted to the Internet.

== Origin ==
In June 1998, a preliminary planning meeting was sponsored by the U.S. National Archives and Records Administration and held in Washington D.C. At the meeting, a research plan was drafted and the project name was selected. The project name “InterPARES” is an acronym for “International Research on Permanent Authentic Records in Electronic Systems,” but it is also Latin for “amongst peers,” a fitting name reflecting the collaborative nature of the project. After another planning meeting in October 1998 in Cagliari, Italy, the project was officially launched on January 1, 1999.

The InterPARES Project was initiated at the University of British Columbia and was based on the findings of an earlier research project conducted there, titled “The Preservation of the Integrity of Electronic Records” (known as “The UBC Project”), which was also funded by SSHRC. The UBC Project principal investigators, Dr. Luciana Duranti and Dr. Terry Eastwood, worked closely with the United States Department of Defense to develop requirements for creating trusted electronic records and for maintaining their authenticity throughout the entire record life cycle from the perspective of the records creator. This collaborative effort resulted in the development of the DOD 5015.2 standard, which is used by the United States Defense Information Systems Agency to certify Records Management Application (RMA) vendors and has served as the foundation for several other standards, such as the European Moreq.

Major funding contributions to the InterPARES Project have been provided by Canada’s Social Science and Humanities Research Council (SSHRC), the American National Historical Publications and Records Commission (HPRC), the National Archives and Records Administration (NARA) of the United States, UNESCO’s Memory of the World Program, and the Italian National Research Council. In fact, National Archives and Records Administration (NARA) has become one of the principal supports of the InterPARES Project. Universities and archival institutions from around the world have participated in the project, including institutions in Canada, the United States, Italy, Croatia, Brazil, Mexico, Belgium, The Netherlands, Sweden, Norway, France, Spain, Portugal, England, Ireland, Australia, Malaysia, and China. Individual researchers from other countries, such as Russia, Chile, and Peru, have also contributed.

== Phases ==
=== Phase 1 ===
The first phase of the InterPARES Project, titled “The Long-Term Preservation of Authentic Electronic Records,” started in 1999 and was completed in 2001. Phase 1 examined the record lifecycle from the perspective of the record preserver and worked to “establish the means against the digital technological background for assessing and maintaining the authenticity of electronic records once they become inactive and are selected for permanent preservation.” More specifically, Phase 1 "used contemporary archival diplomatics and theoretical-deductive methods to derive models of reliable and authentic electronic records in administrative and archival contexts respectively, drawing on the general principles of diplomatics relating to the essential attributes of records." In order to test the validity of those models, four task forces were established that conducted studies on authenticity, appraisal, preservation, and preservation strategy.

The Authenticity Task Force was tasked with developing "conceptual requirements for assessing and maintaining the authenticity of electronic records." The Authenticity Task Force produced a report that proposed two sets of requirements to support authenticity: the benchmark requirements to support the presumption of authenticity of archives, and the baseline requirements to support the certification of copies of records, by an archival institution. These authenticity requirements have been adopted by many organizations and have already been adopted by China as law.

Phase 1 also resulted in the creation of methodologies of appraisal and preservation from the perspective of the preserver, a number of analytical tools for studying new types of digital records, and a conceptual framework for the development of strategies, standards, and policies pertaining to the creation, maintenance, and preservation of digital records which can be shown to be authentic over time.

During Phase 1, researchers found that the classic concept of records hindered their ability to fully understand and engage with electronic systems and that a complementary inductive framework was needed. As a result, a new research project was developed and executed as Phase 2 of the InterPARES Project.

=== Phase 2 ===
Phase 2 of the InterPARES Project, titled “Experiential, Interactive, Dynamic Records,” was initiated in 2002 and completed in 2006. While Phase 1 dealt with textual records created and maintained in static documentary systems, Phase 2 focused on multimedia records created and maintained in dynamic, experiential, and interactive systems.

The primary objective of Phase 2 was “to ensure that the portion of society’s recorded memory digitally produced in dynamic, experiential, and interactive systems in the course of artistic, scientific, and e-government activities can be created in accurate and reliable form, and maintained and preserved in authentic form, both in the short and long term, for the use of those who created it and of society at large, regardless of digital technology obsolescence and media fragility.” By achieving a better understanding of these records, their process of creation, and their potential use, InterPARES 2 built upon the findings of InterPARES 1 “to address the challenge of the permanent preservation of reliable, accurate, and authentic digital records created and maintained in interactive and dynamic systems in the course of all kinds of human activities.”

The project’s study of complex system cases across various fields led to a reconsideration of the concept of the electronic record determined during the first phase, along with the development of policy frameworks, creator and preserver guidelines, benchmark requirements, file format selection guidelines, a terminology database, and two records management models (the Chain of Preservation Model and the Business-Driven Recordkeeping Model). The findings of InterPARES 1 and 2, specifically the resulting concepts, principles, and methodologies, were able to provide “an essential foundation and framework for all digital preservation solutions.”

=== Phase 3 ===
Phase 3 of the InterPARES Project, “Theoretical Elaborations into Archival Management (TEAM),” was initiated in 2007 and completed in 2012. Working from the point of view of the preserver, researchers in Phase 3 built upon the findings of the previous phases to produce “concrete action plans for existing bodies of records that are to be kept over the long term by archives.” The project involved twelve national and regional teams, including Brazil, Canada, China, Italy, as well as Africa and among others.

The primary objective of Phase 3 was to enable “small and medium sized public and private archival organizations and programs, which are responsible for the digital records resulting from government, business, research, art and entertainment, social and/or community activities, to preserve over the long term authentic records that satisfy the requirements of their stakeholders and society’s needs for an adequate record of its past.” Based on general and case studies, as well as earlier InterPARES products and findings, the project was able to generate a variety of practical strategies for preserving access to digital records, producing policies and procedures for the preservation of digital records, improving recordkeeping systems, and managing data warehouses.

=== Phase 4: InterPARES Trust (ITrust) ===
InterPARES Trust, or ITrust, started in 2012 and ended in 2019. ITrust was “a multi-national, interdisciplinary research project exploring issues of trust and trustworthiness of records and data in online environments." The project's goal was to "generate the theoretical and methodological frameworks to develop local, national and international policies, procedures, regulations, standards and legislation, in order to ensure public trust grounded on evidence of good governance, a strong digital economy, and a persistent digital memory.” Researchers who participated in ITrust were experts in a variety of fields, including archival science, diplomatics, records management, law, information technology, information governance, information policy, digital forensics, cybersecurity, computer engineering, e-commerce, and communication.

The project involved more than fifty universities and organizations that formed an International Alliance. The International Alliance included participants from across North America, Latin America, Europe, Africa, Australasia, Asia as well as international institutions. Some of the notable institutions that participated were the British Library, European Commission Anti-Fraud Office, International Federation of Red Cross and Red Crescent Societies, International Monetary Fund, International Records Management Trust, Israel State Archives, Mid-Sweden University, National Archives of Mexico, National Archives of Brazil, National Institute of Standards and Technology, NATO, Renmin University of China, Government of British Columbia, University of Zagreb, State Archives Belgium, UNESCO, University College London, and University of Washington.

The key findings of InterPARES Trust included "theoretical and methodological frameworks for the development of local, national and international policies, procedures, regulations, standards and legislation, to ensure public trust grounded on evidence of good governance, strong digital economy and persistent digital memory." InterPARES Trust explored various themes and topics including has enterprise architecture, information governance, open government, security classified records and declassification. The project generated several knowledge products including three books and numerous peer-reviewed articles and conference papers.

== Application of Findings and Products ==
The Government of Canada currently provides a variety of links and materials on its website for Digital Preservation. Among these resources is “brochure-style document, created by The InterPARES 2 Project [that] can help your museum make informed decisions about creating and maintaining digital materials in ways that help ensure their preservation for as long as they are needed.” The Beinecke Rare Book & Manuscript Library at Yale University consulted Creator Guidelines: Making and Maintaining Digital Materials: Guidelines for Individuals from InterPARES 2 in the creation of its “Authors’ Guidelines for Preserving Digital Archives.”

=== Issues with Non-Compliance ===
According to Charles Sturt University’s first Professor of Library and Information Management Ross Harvey, “the potential to lose vital information with a computer upgrade is huge – including instances where the technology on storing and accessing that information shifts direction.” With an increasing number of records kept in digital formats, the world has arrived at “a crisis point where we depend heavily on electronic records and we have to find new ways to protect them or we’re not only going to lose heritage and memories, but vital data needed to maintain our health and safety.” In order to solve these issues, guidelines must not only be created, but also consistently followed.

The Venice Time Machine is a relatively recent example of a digitization project that suffered as a result of inconsistent adherence to the guidelines produced by InterPARES. Launched by the École Polytechnique Fédérale de Lausanne (EPFL) and the Ca' Foscari University of Venice in 2012, the Venice Time Machine attempted to construct a collaborative multidimensional model of Venice through the creation of an open digital archive of state documents, occupying over 80 kilometers of shelves. In 2019, two partners suspended the project following a disagreement regarding issues of open data and methodology. The State Archives of Venice and the Swiss Federal Institute of Technology in Lausanne (EPFL) halted their data collection.

Gianni Penzo Doria, Director of the State Archives of Venice, expressed concerns regarding the viability of the 8 terabytes of information that has already been collected. Penzo Doria stated that from an archival science standpoint “these files are useless” since the researchers who digitized the documents did not adhere to the archival-science guidelines established by the International Research on Permanent Authentic Records in Electronic Systems (InterPARES) project.

Babak Hamidzadeh, currently the Interim Dean of Libraries at the University of Maryland, described InterPARES as “one of very few efforts that bring together theoreticians and practitioners in digital preservation.” He also commended the Project for its “great work in analyzing problems that exist in practice and in providing solutions to the practitioners.”
