= Heather MacNeil =

Canadian archivist

- Citizenship: Canadian
- Occupations: archivist, professor

Academic work
- Discipline: Archival science
- Institutions: University of Toronto Faculty of Information
- Doctoral students: Jennifer Douglas

Heather MacNeil is a professor at the Faculty of Information of the University of Toronto, Canada. She teaches archives and record keeping related topics. She is a former General Editor of Archivaria (2014-2015) and helped develop the concept of the Archival bond.

Bill Landis, Head of Public Services, Manuscripts and Archives at Yale University Library, nominated MacNeil's 2005 paper "Picking Our Text: Archival Description, Authenticity, and the Archivist as Editor" as his favourite article from American Archivist, saying "Heather MacNeil does an incredible job of unpacking the hidden assumptions we've developed as a profession ...". In 2016 MacNeil was awarded the James J. Talman Award by the Archives Association of Ontario, which is given to individuals who have "demonstrated an outstanding level of imagination and innovation in contribution to the profession."

== Selected publications ==
- MacNeil, Heather (1992). Without consent: the ethics of disclosing personal information in public archives. American Society of Archivists. ISBN 9780810825819.
- MacNeil, Heather (2000). Trusting Records: Legal, Historical, and Diplomatic Perspectives. Dordrecht: Kluwer. ISBN 0792365992.
- MacNeil, Heather; Douglas, Jennifer (August 2014). "The Generic Evolution of Calendars and Guides at the Public Records Office of Great Britain, ca. 1838–1968". Information & Culture: A Journal of History. 49 (3): 294–326. doi:10.1353/lac.2014.0012. S2CID 145435150.
- MacNeil, Heather; Douglas, Jennifer (2015). "Generic Evolution and the Online Archival Catalogue". Archives and Records. 36 (2): 107–127. doi:10.1080/23257962.2015.1070094. S2CID 61796115.
- MacNeil, Heather (2015). "The Role of Calendars in Constructing a Community of Historical Workers in the Public Records Office of Great Britain ca. 1850–1950". In Andersen, Jack (ed.). Genre Theory in Information Studies. Bingley, UK: Emerald.
- MacNeil, Heather (2016). "Deciphering and Interpreting an Archival Fonds and its Parts: A Comparative Analysis of Textual Criticism and the Theory of Archival Arrangement". In Gilliland, Anne J.; McKemmish, Sue; Lau, Andrew (eds.). Research in the Archival Multiverse. Melbourne: Monash University Press.
- MacNeil, Heather (Fall 2017). "Catalogues and the Collecting and Ordering of Knowledge (1): ca. 1550–1750". Archivaria. 82: 27–53.
- MacNeil, Heather; Eastwood, Terry, eds. (2017). Currents of Archival Thinking (2nd ed.). Santa Barbara, California: Libraries Unlimited. ISBN 978-1440839085.
