= Jennifer Douglas (archivist) =

Canadian archivist and academic

- Born: 1974 (age 51–52); Mississauga, Ontario, Canada
- Awards: W. Kaye Lamb Prize

Academic background
- Education: University of Victoria; University of Toronto
- Thesis: Archiving Authors: Rethinking the Analysis and Representation of Personal Archives (2013)
- Doctoral advisor: Heather MacNeil

Jennifer Douglas (b. 1974) is a Canadian archivist and academic who researches the creation of personal archives and their place within with traditional archival practice.

== Career ==
Douglas was born in Mississauga, Ontario in 1974 and was raised in Alberta and British Columbia. She obtained a B.A. and M.A. in English literature from the University of Victoria. Douglas' Ph.D. thesis "Archiving Authors: Rethinking the Analysis and Representation of Personal Archives" was completed in 2013 at the University of Toronto under the supervision of Heather MacNeil. The thesis was awarded the iSchool's Dissertation Award.

Douglas joined UBC School of Library, Archival and Information Studies as an associate professor in 2016. She has served on editorial team of Archivaria, including the role of general editor since 2014. In 2020 she was announced as UCLA's 2021 Kenneth Karmiole Lecture in Archival Studies speaker.

In 2014 "What We Talk About When We Talk About Original Order in Writers' Archives," an article based on her doctoral research won Archivaria's W. Kaye Lamb Prize that recognizes advancements in archival thinking. She won the award for a second time in 2020, along with co-authors Alexandra Alisauskas and Devon Mordell, for the article "'Treat Them with the Reverence of Archivists': Records Work, Grief Work, and Relationship Work in the Archives."

== Select publications ==
=== Articles ===
- Sloan, Katie; Vanderfluit, Jennifer; Douglas, Jennifer (16 July 2019). "Not 'Just My Problem to Handle': Emerging Themes on Secondary Trauma and Archivists". Journal of Contemporary Archival Studies. 6 (1). ISSN 2380-8845.
- Douglas, Jennifer (March 2018). "A call to rethink archival creation: exploring types of creation in personal archives". Archival Science. 18 (1): 29–49. doi:10.1007/s10502-018-9285-8. S2CID 148586102.
- Douglas, Jennifer (June 2016). "Toward More Honest Description 1". The American Archivist. 79 (1): 26–55. doi:10.17723/0360-9081.79.1.26.
- Douglas, Jennifer; Alisauskas, Alexandra; Mordell, Devon (14 November 2019). ""Treat Them with the Reverence of Archivists": Records Work, Grief Work, and Relationship Work in the Archives". Archivaria: 84–120. ISSN 1923-6409.

=== Chapters ===
- Douglas, Jennifer (2010). "Origins: Evolving Ideas About the Principle of Provenance". In MacNeil, Heather; Eastwood, Terry (eds.). Currents of archival thinking (Second ed.). Santa Barbara, California. pp. 23–43. ISBN 9781440839092.
