= Archival bond =

The archival bond is a concept in archival theory referring to the relationship that each archival record has with the other records produced as part of the same transaction or activity and located within the same grouping. These bonds are a core component of each individual record and are necessary for transforming a document into a record, as a document will only acquire meaning (and become a record) through its interrelationships with other records.

== Description ==
The concept of the archival bond is primarily associated with the work of Luciana Duranti along with Heather MacNeil, as part of research into the integrity of electronic records. Duranti resumed and extended the concept of vincolo archivistico (archival bond), first expressed in 1937 by archivist Giorgio Cencetti of the Italian archival school. This bond emerges from the fact that electronic records are not physically arranged like traditional records. For traditional, analog records, their bond is implicit in their arrangement. But for electronic records, this bond must be made explicit due to the lack of a single sequential order of records in a digital environment.

The archival bond was one of the core concepts of the subsequent International Research on Permanent Authentic Records in Electronic Systems (InterPARES) project and can be found in the InterPARES glossary.

As Duranti notes, the archival bond is not to be confused with the broader term "context" as context exists independently of a record, while "the archival bond is an essential part of the record, which would not exist without it."

== See also ==
- Respect des fonds
