= Lost Initiatives: Canada's Forest Industries, Forest Policy and Forest Conservation =

1986 book

- Author: R. Peter Gillis, Thomas R. Roach
- Subject: Forestry in Canada
- Genre: Nonfiction
- Publisher: Greenwood Press
- Publication date: 1986
- Pages: 326
- ISBN: 0-313-25415-X

Lost Initiatives: Canada's Forest Industries, Forest Policy and Forest Conservation is a 1986 book by R. Peter Gillis and Thomas R. Roach.

The 1986 book has 326 pages and was published by Greenwood Press.

== Synopsis ==
Lost Initiatives critiques the forestry management policies of the provincial and federal governments in Canada between 1880 and 1980.

The authors describe the government's actions as failures, and attributes the failure to a lack of care from the Canadian public. The book examines forestry management in Ontario, Quebec, New Brunswick and British Columbia. The book notes the lobbying efforts of the farming and lumber industries.

== Reception ==
C. J. Taylor, of Environment Canada writing in the Archivaria academic journal stated that the book was welcome and important, and he wished the book was better written and needed a better introduction.

H. V. Nelles of York University described the book's analysis as breaking new ground in its critique of the Forestry Service. Nelles wrote that the detailed scope of the book "will be welcomed by all students of North American forest history."

A. V. Backman, writing in the Journal of Forest History described the book as thoroughly researched.
