= Outline of Venice =

Overview of and topical guide to Venice

The following outline is provided as an overview of and topical guide to Venice:

Venice – city in northeastern Italy and the capital of the Veneto region. It is situated across a group of 118 small islands that are separated by canals and linked by bridges, of which there are 400. The islands are located in the shallow Venetian Lagoon, an enclosed bay that lies between the mouths of the Po and the Piave Rivers. Parts of Venice are renowned for the beauty of their settings, their architecture, and artwork. The lagoon and a part of the city are listed as a World Heritage Site. The Republic of Venice was a major financial and maritime power during the Middle Ages and Renaissance, and a staging area for the Crusades and the Battle of Lepanto, as well as a very important center of commerce (especially silk, grain, and spice) and art in the 13th century up to the end of the 17th century. The City State of Venice is considered to have been the first real international financial center which gradually emerged from the 9th century to its peak in the 14th century. This made Venice a wealthy city throughout most of its history.

== General reference ==
- Pronunciation: /ˈvɛnɪs/ VEN-iss; Italian: Venezia [veˈnɛttsja]; Venetian: Venesia [veˈnɛsja], outdatedly Venexia [veˈnɛzja]
- Common English name(s): Venice
- Official English name(s): City of Venice
- Adjectival(s): Venetian
- Demonym(s): Venetian

== Geography of Venice ==
Geography of Venice

- Venice is:
  - a city
  - Capital of Veneto
- Population of Venice: 249,466
- Area of Venice: 414.57 km^{2} (160.07 sq mi)
- Atlas of Venice

=== Location of Venice ===
Venice (Italy)
- Venice is situated within the following regions:
  - Northern Hemisphere and Eastern Hemisphere
  - Eurasia
    - Europe (outline)
      - Western Europe
      - Southern Europe
        - Italian Peninsula
          - Italy (outline)
            - Northern Italy
              - Northeast Italy
                - Veneto
- Time zone(s):

=== Environment of Venice ===
- Climate of Venice

=== Areas of Venice ===
- Districts of Venice

=== Locations in Venice ===
==== Historic locations in Venice ====
- Venetian Arsenal
- Bridge of Sighs
- Ca' d'Oro
- Ca' Foscari
- Ca' Pesaro
- Ca' Rezzonico
- Ca' Vendramin Calergi
- Doge's Palace
- Gallerie dell'Accademia
- Grand Canal
- Punta della Dogana
- Il Redentore
- Rialto Bridge
- Church of San Giorgio Maggiore
- Santa Maria della Salute
- Santa Maria Gloriosa dei Frari
- Santi Giovanni e Paolo, Venice
- St Mark's Basilica

=== Demographics of Venice ===
Demographics of Venice

== Government and politics of Venice ==
Government and politics of Venice

- Government of Venice
  - Council of Venice
  - List of mayors of Venice

== History of Venice ==
History of the city of Venice

- Timeline of Venice
- Venice Time Machine

== Culture of Venice ==
Culture of Venice

- Cuisine of Venice
- Symbols of Venice
  - Flag of Venice
- People of Venice

=== Architecture of Venice ===
Architecture of Venice

- Venetian Renaissance architecture
- List of buildings and structures in Venice
  - List of bridges in Venice
  - List of churches in Venice
  - List of palaces in Venice
  - List of theatres and opera houses in Venice

=== Art in Venice ===
- Cinema in Venice
  - Venice International Film Festival
- Music of Venice

=== Religion in Venice ===
- Christianity in Venice
  - Catholicism in Venice
    - Roman Catholic Archdiocese of Venice
- Judaism in Venice
  - History of the Jews in Venice

=== Sports in Venice ===
Sports in Venice

- Running in Venice
  - Venice Marathon

== Economy and infrastructure of Venice ==
Economy of Venice

=== Transportation in Venice ===
Transportation in Venice

- List of bridges in Venice
- Port of Venice

== Education in Venice ==
Education in Venice

- Public education in Venice
- Colleges and universities in Venice
  - University of Venice
  - Conservatorio di Musica Benedetto Marcello di Venezia
  - Francesco Morosini Naval Military School
  - Università Iuav di Venezia
  - Venice International University
- Studium Generale Marcianum

== See also ==
- Outline of geography
