= Rebecka Sheffield =

Canadian archivist, policy advisor and author (born 1976)

- Born: 1976 (age 49–50)
- Occupations: Archivist, scholar, records manager

Academic background
- Education: University of Toronto; University of Saskatchewan
- Thesis: The Emergence, Development and Survival of Four Lesbian and Gay Archives (2015)
- Doctoral advisor: Patrick Keilty

Academic work
- Institutions: Archives of Ontario, Simmons University, University of British Columbia, University of Toronto, University of Waterloo

Rebecka Sheffield is an archivist, scholar, and policy advisor. She was a Senior Policy Advisor of the Archives of Ontario and teaches information science in American and Canadian universities.

== Biography ==
Rebecka Sheffield has a bachelor's degree in women and gender studies from the University of Saskatchewan, a master's degree in archival studies from the University of Toronto, and a PhD from the University of Toronto in collaboration with the Mark S. Bonham Center for Sexual Diversity Studies.

She is a previous director of The ArQuives and previous vice-president of the Association of Canadian Archivists.

Sheffield is a scholar in archival science. She is the author of Documenting Rebellions: A Study of Four Lesbian and Gay Archives in Queer Times, which discusses the relationship between archives and social movements within the LGBTQ2+ community. She has also worked as a public advocate for the preservation of queer cultural history in Toronto.

Sheffield's archival contributions focus on community archives and historical and cultural heritage movements in LGBTQ2+ communities.

Sheffield is the lead of an archival and artistic project The Bedside Table Archives, which documents objects found on the bedside tables of lesbian and queer women. The project focuses on the home as a space for identity construction while questioning the heteronormativity of such spaces.

She has also published Documenting Rebellions: A Study of Four Lesbian and Gay Archives in Queer Times, which focuses on four institutions that preserve the records of queer people.

She is the managing editor of the journal Archivaria. Since 2024, she has been the head of Special Collections & Archives at the University of Waterloo.

== Publications ==
=== Books ===
- Any Other Way: How Toronto Got Queer (co-edited with John Lorinc, Jane Farrow, Stephanie Chambers, Maureen FitzGerald, Tim McCaskell, Tatum Taylor, Rahim Thawer, and Ed Jackson). Coach House Books, 2017.
- Documenting Rebellions: A Study of Four Lesbian and Gay Archives in Queer Times. Litwin Books, 2020.

=== Book chapters and articles ===
- "The Bedside Table Archives: Archive Intervention and Lesbian Intimate Domestic Culture." Radical History Review, no. 120 (2014): 108–120. doi:10.1215/01636545-2703751
- "Privacy, Context & Pride: The Management of Digital Photographs in a Queer Archives." In Queers Online: LGBT Digital Practices in Libraries, Archives, and Museums. Litwin Books, 2015.
- "Take Me Away to Another World ." In Any Other Way: How Toronto Got Queer. Toronto: Coach House Books, 2017.
- "Community Archives." In Currents of Archival Thinking, 2nd edition. Libraries Unlimited, 2017.
- "Archival Optimism, or, How to Sustain a Community Archives." In Community Archives, Community Spaces: Heritage, Memory and Identity. Facet Publishing, 2020.
