= Wendell Holmes =

Wendell Holmes may refer to:

- Wendell Holmes (actor) (1914–1962), American actor
- Wendell Holmes (1943–2015), American musician and member of the Holmes Brothers

== See also ==
- Oliver Wendell Holmes (disambiguation)
