= Helen Darbishire =

English literary scholar and educator

- Born: 1881; Oxford, England
- Died: 1961 (aged 79–80)
- Occupations: literary scholar; Principal of Somerville College, Oxford

Helen Darbishire, CBE, FBA (26 February 1881 – 11 March 1961) was an English literary scholar, who was Principal of Somerville College, Oxford, from 1931 until her retirement in 1945.

== Life ==
Helen Darbishire was born in Oxford, the daughter of Samuel Dukinfield Darbishire, a physician at the Radcliffe Infirmary. She was educated at Oxford Girls' High School before going as a scholar to Somerville College, Oxford, where she graduated first-class in English in 1903. After being a visiting lecturer at Royal Holloway College, she returned to Somerville as a tutor in English in 1908. She was the first woman to be chair of the faculty board of English at Oxford University. In 1925-6 she held a visiting professorship at Wellesley College. On her return to Oxford she was appointed university lecturer.

In 1931 she succeeded Margery Fry as principal of Somerville, resigning her university lectureship (though continuing to teach and lecture). Darbishire remained principal of Somerville until her retirement in 1945, overseeing considerable building expansion at the college.

Her work as a literary scholar focussed on Milton and Wordsworth. She became a trustee of Dove Cottage and eventually moved to the Lake District.

== Honours ==
In 1947, Darbishire was elected a Fellow of the British Academy (FBA). In the 1955 Birthday Honours, she was appointed a Commander of the Order of the British Empire (CBE).

== Works ==
- The early lives of Milton, 1932
- The poet Wordsworth, 1949
- The poetical works of John Milton: with translations of the Italian, Latin and Greek poems from the Columbia University edition, 1952

Academic offices
Preceded by Margery Fry	Principal; Somerville College, Oxford; 1930-1945	Succeeded by Janet Vaughan
