= Janet Vaughan =

British physiologist and radiobiologist

Dame Janet Vaughan DBE FRS
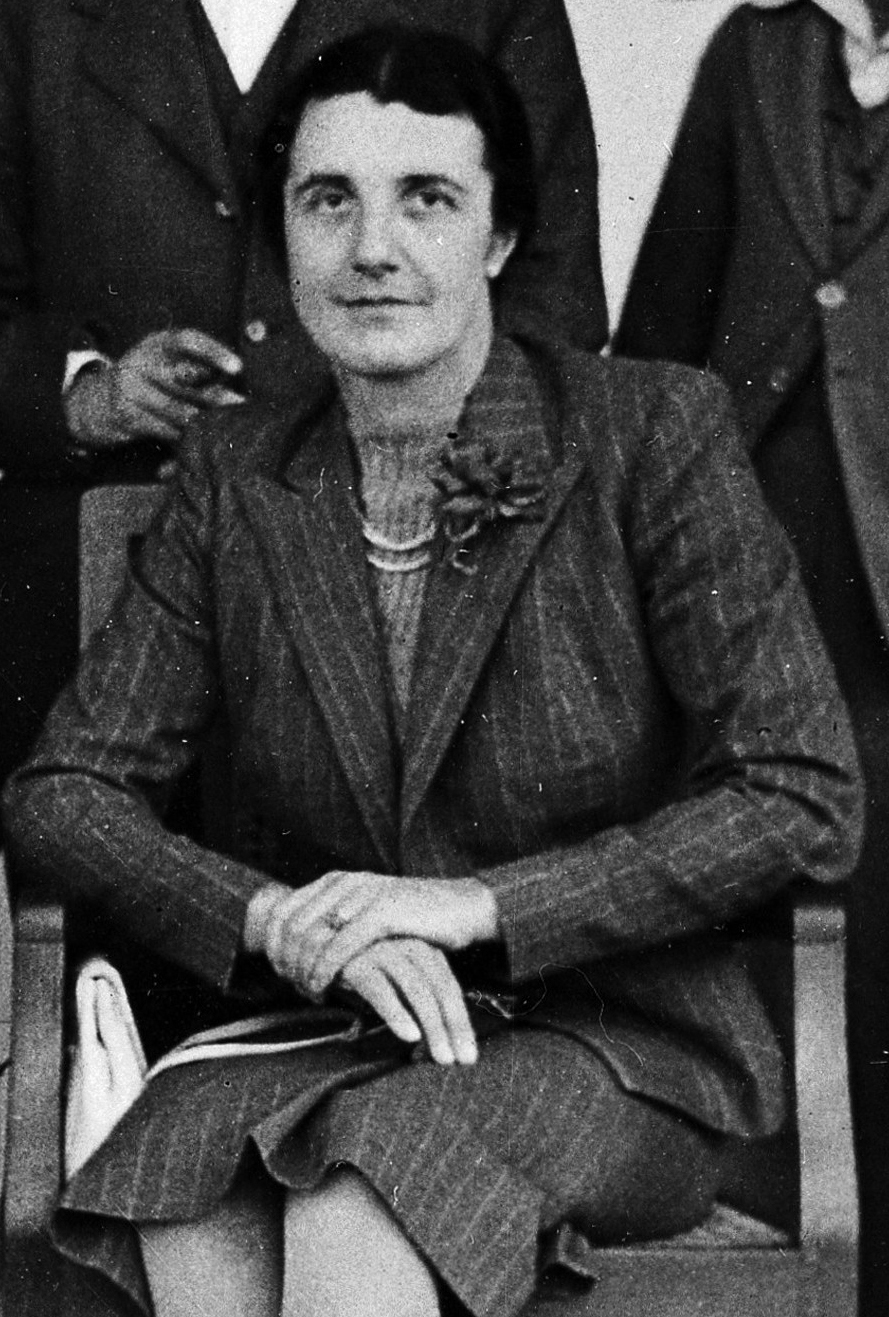
- Vaughan in 1944

6th Principal of Somerville College, Oxford
- In office 1945–1967
- Preceded by: Helen Darbishire
- Succeeded by: Barbara Craig

Personal details
- Born: Janet Maria Vaughan; 18 October 1899 Clifton, Bristol, England
- Died: 9 January 1993 (aged 93) UK
- Education: North Foreland Lodge
- Alma mater: Somerville College, Oxford
- Profession: Physician, physiologist, college head
- Awards: DBE (1957); FRS (1979)

Dame Janet Maria Vaughan, Mrs Gourlay DBE FRS (18 October 1899 – 9 January 1993), was a British physiologist, academic, and academic administrator. She researched haematology and radiation pathology. From 1945 to 1967, she served as Principal of Somerville College, Oxford.

== Early life ==
Born in Clifton, Bristol, she was the eldest of four children of William Wyamar Vaughan (a maternal first cousin of Virginia Woolf and later headmaster of Rugby) and Margaret "Madge" Symonds, daughter of John Addington Symonds. At the time of her birth he was an assistant master at Clifton College. She was educated at home, and later at North Foreland Lodge and Somerville College, Oxford, where she studied medicine under Charles Sherrington and J. B. S. Haldane. She did her clinical training at University College Hospital, London, where she worked in London's slums and saw firsthand the effects of poverty on health.

Later she received a scholarship from the Rockefeller Foundation to study at Harvard University.

== Career ==
As a woman doctor, Vaughan had difficulties gaining access to patients and experimented on pigeons. Woolf described her as "an attractive woman; competent, disinterested, taking blood tests all day to solve abstract problems".

As a young pathologist at the Royal Postgraduate Medical School at Hammersmith Hospital in 1938 she initiated the creation of national blood banks in London, setting one up with Federico Duran-Jorda. The modified milk bottle for blood collection and storage was named "MRC bottle" or "Janet Vaughan".

In 1945, she was sent to Belgium by the Medical Research Council to research starvation, and then into Germany; at war's end she was working in the Bergen-Belsen concentration camp and significantly improved the strategy to feed people suffering from extreme starvation.

Vaughan's research included blood disease, blood transfusion, the treatment of starvation, and the effect of radioactivity on the bone and bone marrow. Her 1934 book, The Anaemias, was one of the first specialised treatments of blood diseases. After the war, she became known for her work on the effects of plutonium.

From 1945 until her retirement in 1967, while working as a researcher at the Churchill Hospital, she was Principal of Somerville College. She was Principal while Shirley Catlin (later Shirley Williams, Baroness Williams of Crosby) and Margaret Roberts (who would later become the British Prime Minister Margaret Thatcher) studied there. She also served on the Royal Commission on Equal Pay, as a founder trustee of the Nuffield Foundation, and for one year as chairman of the Oxford Regional Hospital Board.

== Honours ==
Vaughan was appointed Dame Commander of the Order of the British Empire (DBE) in the 1957 New Year Honours. Oxford University awarded her an honorary DCL in 1967. She was elected a Fellow of the Royal Society (FRS) in 1979.

== Publications ==
- Vaughan, Janet. The Anemias. London: Oxford University Press, 1934.
- Vaughan, Janet. "Leuco-erythoblastic Anemias", Journal of Pathology and Bacteriology 17 (1936):541-64.
- Vaughan, Janet. "Conditions at Belsen Concentration Camp", British Medical Journal, Physiology and treatment of starvation ser. (1945):819
- Vaughan, Janet. The Physiology of Bone. Oxford: Clarendon Press, 1969.
- Vaughan, Janet. The Effect of Irradiation of the Skeleton. Oxford: Clarendon Press, 1973.

== Personal life ==
She married David Gourlay, of the Wayfarers' Travel Agency, in 1930. They had two daughters: Mary (1932) and Frances (1935).

Academic offices
Preceded by Helen Darbishire	Principal; Somerville College, Oxford; 1945–1967	Succeeded by Barbara Craig
