= Oliver Holmes =

Oliver Holmes may refer to:

- Oliver Holmes (rugby league)
- Oliver Wendell Holmes (disambiguation)
