= Oliver Wendell Holmes =

Oliver Wendell Holmes may refer to:

== People ==
- Oliver Wendell Holmes Sr. (1809–1894), poet, physician, and essayist, father of the judge
- Oliver Wendell Holmes Jr. (1841–1935), an associate justice of the Supreme Court of the United States, son of the essayist
- Oliver Wendell Holmes (archivist) (1902–1981), American archivist and historian
- Wendell Holmes (actor) (1914–1962), character actor Oliver Wendell Holmes

== Schools ==
- Oliver Wendell Holmes Junior High School, junior high school in Davis, California, named after Oliver Wendell Holmes Sr.
- Oliver Wendell Holmes High School, high school in San Antonio, Texas named after Oliver Wendell Holmes Jr.

== See also ==
- Oliver Wendell Holmes House, Oliver Wendell Holmes Jr.'s house
- Oliver Holmes (disambiguation)
