= Hugh Taylor (archivist) =

Canadian archivist (1920–2005)

- Born: Hugh Alexander Taylor; 22 January 1920; England
- Died: 11 September 2005 (aged 85); Victoria, British Columbia, Canada

Provincial Archivist of Nova Scotia
- In office 1978–1982
- Preceded by: Charles Bruce Fergusson
- Succeeded by: Phyllis Blakeley

Hugh Alexander Taylor (22 January 1920 – 11 September 2005) was an English-born Canadian archivist, archival theorist and educator.

Born in England in 1920, Taylor studied history at the University of Oxford and took his Archives Diploma at the University of Liverpool. His early archival career in England included positions with the Leeds Public Libraries, Liverpool Public Libraries, the County of Northumberland, and the University of Newcastle upon Tyne.

Taylor emigrated to Canada in 1965, taking the position of founding Provincial Archivist of the Provincial Archives of Alberta. He also became founding Provincial Archivist of New Brunswick in 1967 and joined the Public Archives of Canada (PAC) in 1971 as Director of the Historical Branch, which he renamed the Archives Branch shortly after his arrival. He established eight divisions within his branch, including media and maps. Taylor left the Public Archives of Canada to become the Provincial Archivist of Nova Scotia in 1978, retiring in 1982 to Wolfville, NS. He and his wife moved to Qualicum Beach in 1989, and later to Victoria in 1993.

During his career at the Public Archives of Canada, Taylor undertook numerous initiatives that shaped that institution as well as the archival profession. Internally, he recreated its organizational structure to highlight the strength of its media-based archives. He was also a strong supporter of the newly formed Association of Canadian Archivists as well as its new scholarly journal, Archivaria. He served as president of the Society of American Archivists (SAA) from 1978 to 1979.

He died in Victoria, BC on 11 September 2005.

== Contributions to archival theory ==
Taylor's essays and ideas exploring the nature of archives were possibly the most influential aspect of his career. As Terry Cook noted in his 2005 obituary, Taylor "was intent on constructing archives anew, imagining them as places where archivists connect their records with social issues, with new media and recording technologies, with the historical traditions of archives, with the earth’s ecological systems, and with the broader search for spiritual meaning."

== Public recognition ==
The Association of Canadian Archivists awarded Taylor the W. Kaye Lamb Award for best writing in Archivaria as well as honorary membership in 1990. He was named an Officer of the Order of Canada in 1990. In 1992, the Association of Canadian Archivists published The Archival Imagination: Essays in Honour of Hugh A. Taylor, a festschrift written by archivists whom he had inspired. A collection of his most influential essays, Imagining Archives: Essays and Reflections by Hugh A. Taylor, appeared in 2002. In 2006, the Association of Canadian Archivists established the Hugh A. Taylor Prize, presented to the writer of the Archivaria article that presents new ideas or syntheses in new and imaginative ways.

== Personal life ==
Taylor joined the Royal Air Force (RAF) in 1939 and served as a wireless operator through the Second World War. Following the war, while at Oxford University he was part of the rowing crew for Keble College.

Taylor met his wife, Daphne Mary Johnson, through the Ecumenical Movement in England in 1958. They were married on January 3, 1959, and had three daughters: Madeline, Mary and Ruth. The family emigrated to Canada in 1965.

== Publications ==
- Taylor, Hugh A. (1949). Tynmouth in Ralph Gardner's Day: A Fragment of Local Government in the Seventeenth Century. Private printing, 1949.
- — (1955). "Politics in Famine-stricken Preston: An Examination of Liberal Party Management, 1861-1866." Transactions of the Lancashire and Cheshire Historic Society 107, 121–139.
- — (1955) "The Letters of David Samwell, 1772-1798." Bulletin [Liverpool Libraries, Museums and Arts Committee]. 6: 1/2.
- — (1958). "Matthew Gregson and the Pursuit of Taste." Transactions of the Lancashire and Cheshire Historic Society 110, 157–176.
- — (1962) "Local History: An Experiments with Slides and Tapes." Archives 5:27, 142–144.
- — (1963). Northumberland History - A Brief Guide to the Records and Aids in Newcastle upon Tyne. Newcastle upon Tyne: Northumberland County Council.
- — (1968). "Chairman's Letter." The Canadian Archivist. 1:6, 3.
- — (1969). "Provincial Archives: Problems and Perspectives." World Conference on Records and Genealogical Seminar, Salt Lake City, Utah, 1969. Salt Lake City: Genealogical Society of the Church of Latter Day Saints.
- — (1969). "Archives in Britain and Canada -- Impressions of an Immigrant." The Canadian Archivist. 1:7, 22–23.
- — (1970). "Administrative History: An Archivist's Need." The Canadian Archivist. 2:1, 4–9.
- — (1971). New Brunswick History: A Checklist of Secondary Sources Frederickton, N.B.: Provincial Archives of New Brunswick.
- — (1971). "The Provincial Archives of New Brunswick." Acadiensis. 1:1, 71–83.
- — (1972). "Information Retrieval and the Training of Archivists." The Canadian Archivist. 2:3, 30–35.
- — (1972). "Clio in the Raw: Archival Materials and the Teaching of History." The American Archivist. 35:3/4, 317–330.
- — (1972). "Harding, Francis Pym." Dictionary of Canadian Biography. Marc La Terreur, ed. Toronto: University of Toronto Press. volume 10. 1871–1880.
- — (1975–1976). "SAA Philadelphia 1975." Archivaria. 1:Winter, 94–96.
- — (1976). "Canadian Archives: Patterns from a Federal Perspective." Archivaria. 2:Summer, 3–19.
- — (1976–1977). "Oral History and Archives: Keynote Speech to the 1976 Canadian Oral History Conference." Canadian Oral History Journal. 2, 1–5.
- — (1977). "The Discipline of History and the Education of the Archivist." The American Archivist. 40:4. 395–402.
- — (1978). "The Media of Records: Archives in the Wake of McLuhan." Georgia Archive. 6:1, 1–10.
- — (1978). "Nova Scotia's Freedom of Information Act." Archivaria. 6, 1958.
- — (1978). "Security -- A Response." Archival Association of Atlantic Canada Newsletter. 6:2, 8–12.
- — (1979)."The Archival Experience in England and Canada." The Midwestern Archivist. 4:1, 53–56.
- — (1979) "Focus." The American Archivist. 42, 9–11.
- — (1979). "The President's Page." The American Archivist. 42, 259–261.
- — (1979) "The President's Page: The 'Cloistered' Archivist." The American Archivist. 42, 405–407.
- — (1979). "The President's Page: Into the Nineteen Eighties." The American Archivist. 42, 551–555.
- — (1979). "Documentary Art and the Role of the Archivist." The American Archivist. 42:4, 417–428.
- — (1980). "As Others Saw Us: The European Vision in Nova Scotia." The Canadian Collector. 15:5, 30–33.
- — (1980). "The Arrangement and Description of Archival Materials." International Council on Archives Handbook Series. Munich: K.G. Saur.
- — (1980–1981). "Canadian Archives: Reports and Responses - Individual Responses." Archivaria. 11, 32–34.
- — (1980–1981). "Family History: Some New Directions and Their Implications for the Archivist." Archivaria. 11, 228–231.
- — "The Collective Memory: Archives and Libraries as Heritage." Archivaria. 15, 118-130.
- — (1983). "The Applebaum-Hébert Report: Personal Observations." Archivaria. 16, 128–129.
- — (1983). "'Unshaken Attachment': The Loyalists of Nova Scotia, 1779-1809." The Loyalist Gazette. 21:2, 7–8.
- — (1984). "Archival Services and the Concept of the User: A RAMP Study." General Information and UNISIST. Paris: UNESCO.
- — "Canadian Archival Literature Revisited." Archivaria. 18, 10–11.
- — (1984). "Information Ecology and the Archives of the 1980s." Archivaria. 18, 25–37.
- — (1985). "Screening the News: Who Gets Through?" Bulletin [Association for the Study of Radio and Television]. 26, 12–14.
- — (1985). "Archives in the Home." Federation News [Federation of Nova Scotia Heritage] 9:1, 11–12.
- — (1985–1986). "Through the Minefield." Archivaria. 21, 180–185.
- — (1987). "From Dust to Ashes: Burnout in the Archives." The Midwestern Archivist. 12:2, 73–82.
- — (1987). "Strategies for the Future: The Preservation of Archival Materials in Canada." Conservation Administration News 29, 1–3.
- — (1987–1988). "Transformation in the Archives: Technological Adjustment or Paradigm Shift?" Archivaria. 25, 12–28.
- — "'My Very Act and Deed': Some Reflections on the Role of Textual Records in the Conduct of Affairs." The American Archivist. 51:4, 456–469.
- — "The Totemic Universe: Appraising the Documentary Future." In Christopher Hives (Ed.) Archival Appraisal: Theory and Practice -- Proceedings of the Joint Meeting of the Association of British Columbia Archivist and the Northwest Archivists, 1990. (pp. 15–21). Vancouver: Archives Association of British Columbia.
- — ""The Conjuring Tent": News Documents as Valid Historical Evidence." In Richard Lochead (Ed.), Beyond the Printed Word: The Evolution of Canada's Broadcast News Heritage. (pp.89-93). Kingston: Quarry Press.
- — "Chip Monks at the Gate: The Impact of Technology on Archives, Libraries and the User." Archivaria. 33, 173–180.
- — "Recycling the Past: The Archivist in the Age of Ecology." Archivaria. 35, 203–213.
- — ""The Valour and the Horror" : Hypertext as History?" Archivaria. 36, 189-193.
- — "Heritage Revisited: Documents as Artifacts in the Context of Museums and Material Culture." Archivaria. 40, 8-20.
- — (1997) "The Archivist, the Letter, and the Spirit." Archivaria. 42, 1–16.

== See also ==
- List of archivists
