= Phyllis Blakeley =

Canadian historian (1922–1986)

Phyllis Blakeley CM
- Born: Phyllis Ruth Blakeley; 2 August 1922; Halifax, Nova Scotia, Canada
- Died: 25 October 1986 (aged 64); Halifax, Nova Scotia, Canada
- Occupations: Historian; archivist
- Awards: Member of the Order of Canada

Provincial Archivist of Nova Scotia
- In office 1982–1985
- Preceded by: Hugh Taylor
- Succeeded by: Carman V. Carroll

Phyllis Ruth Blakeley CM (2 August 1922 – 25 October 1986) was a Canadian historian, biographer and archivist who served as the Provincial Archivist of Nova Scotia from 1982 to 1985.

== Biography ==
Born in Halifax, Nova Scotia, Blakeley received a Bachelor of Arts degree, a Bachelor of Education degree, and a Master of Arts degree from Dalhousie University. In 1945, she became a research assistant at the Public Archives of Nova Scotia. She became assistant archivist in 1959 and associate archivist in 1977. In 1982, she was appointed as the provincial archivist for Nova Scotia and was the first woman to hold that position. She retired in 1985.

Her publications include Glimpses of Halifax (1949), Nova Scotia - A Brief History (1956), The Story of Prince Edward Island (1963), and Nova Scotia's Two Remarkable Giants: Angus McAskill and Anna Swan (1970). She was also a contributor to the Dictionary of Canadian Biography, having contributed 31 historical biographies.

In 1978, she was made a Member of the Order of Canada for having "served her province [Nova Scotia] for well over thirty years" and for "devoting herself particularly to the preservation of its cultural heritage". She received a Doctor of Law degree from Dalhousie University in 1977 and a Doctor of Letters from St. Mary's University in 1983. In 1979, she was made a Fellow of the Royal Nova Scotia Historical Society.

Blakeley died in Halifax on 25 October 1986.

== Legacy ==
In 1988, the Council of Nova Scotia Archives established the Dr. Phyllis R. Blakeley Award for Archival Excellence as a memorial to her contributions to the field and in recognition of current outstanding efforts in the profession. The award is granted to member institutions and organizations in good standing with the Council of Nova Scotia Archives.
