= Kent Haworth =

Canadian archivist

Kent M. Haworth (1946–2003) was a Canadian archivist, best known for his pioneering role in the creation of archival descriptive standards in Canada. He published widely on a number of topics of importance to the development of archival theory, lectured and presented throughout the world, and was a contributing member of many national and international archival committees and associations.

Haworth was editor of the British Columbia Historical News in the late 1970s and early 1980s, published by the British Columbia Historical Federation, along with Patricia Roy and Terry Eastwood.

In 1972 Haworth was hired at the Provincial Archives of British Columbia where he worked in the Manuscripts Division. In 1979 he was appointed as Chief of the PABC's Aural and Visual Records Programme, with responsibility for the management of all non-textual records held by the provincial archives. He worked as the University Archivist at the University of Toronto from 1984-1989, Public Records Archivist at Nova Scotia Archives and Records Management from 1989-1993, and finally served as University Archivist at York University from 1993 to 2002.

== Contributions to archival theory ==
Perhaps Haworth's most significant contribution to archival practice was his leadership in the creation and establishment of a national standard of archival description, the Rules for Archival Description (RAD). Haworth was part of the Planning Committee on Descriptive Standards established by the Bureau of Canadian Archivists in 1987 and later served as chair from 1989 to 1996. RAD provided a foundation for common archives development across Canada, facilitated the creation of descriptive software for archival institution and created a shared standard of practice across institutions.

In addition to writing the standard, he also advocated the establishment of a national grant program, the Canadian Council of Archives' Canadian Archival Information Network (CAIN), to support the creation and maintenance of online descriptive databases managed at the provincial level. His work on the Planning Committee on Descriptive Standards in Canada led to work on international standards bodies such as the International Congress of Archives' Committee on Descriptive Standards (CDS) in 1996. He later served as Project Director and Secretary of this body, and worked to revise ISSAR (CPF).

== List of publications ==
- Haworth, Kent; Maier, Charles (Autumn 1975). "'Not a Matter of Regret': Granville's Response to Seymour's Death". BC Studies (27): 62–66.
- Haworth, Kent (August 1975). "The Role of the Provincial Archives in Local History: one approach to local historical collections". ABCA Newsletter. 4: 7.
- Haworth, Kent (Winter 1976–1977). "Local Archives: Responsibilities and Challenges for Archivists". Archivaria. 3: 28–39.
- Haworth, Kent (1982). "Anthony Musgrave". Dictionary of Canadian Biography. Vol. XI. Toronto: University of Toronto. pp. 634–637.
- Haworth, Kent Haworth, Kent. (Winter 1981–1982). "Welfare for Archives and the Will of Archivists". Archivaria. 13: 124–126.
- Haworth, Kent; Dryden, Jean (1987). "Developing Descriptive Standards: A Call to Action". Bureau of Canadian Archivists Planning Committee on Descriptive Standards. Occasional Paper (1). Ottawa: Bureau of Canadian Archivists.
- Haworth, Kent; Duff, Wendy (Winter 1990–1991). "The Reclamation of Archival Description: The Canadian Perspective". Archivaria. 31: 26–35.
- Haworth, Kent (1991). "Standardizing Archival Description in Canada". Archivi & Computer. 1 (1): 13–17.
- Haworth, Kent (Summer 1992). "The Development of Descriptive Standards in Canada: A Progress Report". Archivaria. 34: 75–90.
- Haworth, Kent (1992). "Improving Access to Government Records at PANS". The Nova Scotia Genealogist. 10 (3): 108–113.
- Haworth, Kent (1992). "The Principles Speak for Themselves: Articulating a Language of Purpose for Archives". In Craig, Barbara L. (ed.). The Archival Imagination, Essays in Honour of Hugh Taylor. Ottawa: Association of Canadian Archivists. pp. 90–104.
- Haworth, Kent (1993). "Dedication, in Memoriam Harold Naugler, 1942-1992". Toward International Descriptive Standards for Archives. London. pp. xi–xii.
- Haworth, Kent (Autumn 1993). "The Voyage of RAD: from the Old World to the New". Archivaria. 36: 5–12.
- Haworth, Kent (8–9 April 1994). "Grasping the Big Picture". La mission de la archivistse dans la societé : Proceedings of the 2nd Symposium of the Groupe Interdisicplinaire de Recherche en Archivistique (GIRA). Groupe Interdisicplinaire de Recherche en Archivistique (GIRA). Université de Montréal. pp. 79–86.
- Haworth, Kent (May 1994). "Sorting out the Myth and Reality of RAD". ACA Bulletin: 10–11.
- Haworth, Kent (1994). "Standardizing Archival Description in the Information Age". Archivum Proceedings of the 12th International Congress on Archives, Paris 1994. International Congress on Archives. Vol. XXXIX. Paris. pp. 187–199.
- Haworth, Kent (January 1995). "Whither the CBC archives? Who cares?". ACA Bulletin: 26–27.
- Haworth, Kent (November 1997). "Advancing Archival Description: A Model for Rationalizing North American Descriptive Standards". Archives and Manuscripts. 25 (2): 194–217.
- Haworth, Kent (November 1997). "Archives and Hospitals: Do we really need them?". ACA Bulletin. 22 (2): 14.
- Haworth, Kent (November 1997). "The Preservation of Digital Media: What Hope Do We Have?". ACA Bulletin. 22 (2): 9–10.
- Haworth, Kent (Winter 1998). "Arguing about Deck Chairs, or Saving the Sinking Ship". AABC Newsletter. 8 (1): 7.
- Haworth, Kent (January 1999). "Developing Canada's Information Network for Year 2000". Off the Record. 15 (1): 15.
- Haworth, Kent (2001). "Archival Description: Content and Context in Search of Structure". Journal of Internet Cataloging. 34: 7–26. doi:10.1300/J141v04n03_02. S2CID 62305196.
- Haworth, Kent (March 2002). "The Census Issue, 'Ordinary Canadians' and Dissent: An Introduction to a Formal Presentation to Statistics Canada". ACA Bulletin: 4–5.
- Haworth, Kent (2005). ""Standing on the Shoulders of our Predecessors...": Preliminary conclusions of a study of Archival Description in the Netherlands and the application of International Description Standards for the purpose of Information Exchange"". In Beyea, Marion; Ware, Reuben; Avery, Cheryl (eds.). The Power and Passion of Archives: a Festchrift in Honour of Kent Haworth. Saskatoon: Association of Canadian Archivists. pp. 205–210.
