= Luciana Duranti =

- Born: September 28, 1950 (age 74)
- Scientific career
- Fields: Archival science

Luciana Duranti is an archival theorist and Professor Emerita on post-retirement appointment in the fields of archival science and diplomatics at the University of British Columbia School of Information (iSchool) in Vancouver, Canada. She is a noted expert on diplomatics and electronic records. Since 1998, she has been the director of the electronic records research project, InterPARES (International Research on Permanent Authentic Records in Electronic Systems). She has disclosed the concept of the archival bond originally initiated by Italian archivist Giorgio Cencetti in 1937.

== Education ==
- Honorary Doctor of Science, Mid Sweden University, 2019
- BA, French Language, Ecole Internationale de Langue et Civilization Française, 1979
- Diploma di Archivistica (Master’s equivalent), Scuola dell’Archivio di Stato di Roma, 1979
- Ph D, Archivista-Paleografo, Scuola Speciale per Archivisti e Bibliotecari, Università di Roma, 1975
- Dottoressa in Lettere (Master's equivalent, Arts), Università di Roma, 1973

== Affiliations ==
Duranti has served the Association of Canadian Archivists and the Society of American Archivists in many capacities. She served as president of the Society of American Archivists from 1998 to 1999 and the Association of Canadian Archivists from 2017 to 2018. She is the Principal Investigator for many investigations, including the Records in the Cloud Project.

She has also served as co-chair for the Steering Committee on Canada's Archives.

== Awards ==
- Fellow, Association of Canadian Archivists, 2014
- Emmett Leahy Award, 2006
- Fellow, Society of American Archivists, 1998

== Selected bibliography ==
Duranti has published several works in archival diplomatics and archival theory and has presented her theories and research at conferences and symposiums worldwide.

- Duranti, Luciana (1998). Diplomatics: New Uses for an Old Science. Scarecrow Press. ISBN 9780810835283.
- Duranti, Luciana; Franks, Patrica, eds. (2015). Encyclopedia of Archival Science. Rowman&Littlefield. ISBN 978-0-8108-8810-4.
- Duranti, Luciana; Rogers, Corinna, eds. (2019). Trusting Records in the Cloud: the creation, management, and preservation of trustworthy digital content. London: Facet Publishing. ISBN 9781783304028.
