= James Conway Davies =

Welsh historian and palaeographer

James Conway Davies (1891–1971) was a Welsh historian and palaeographer.

== Biography ==
Born in Llanelli, Carmarthenshire, he was educated at the University College of Wales in Aberystwyth and Cardiff, and Emmanuel College, Cambridge. While at Cambridge, he was Secretary of Cambridge University Liberal Club from 1915–16, and as the society wound down in 1916 for the remainder of World War I, he held on to the society's minutes and papers for the preceding 19 years. He was a lecturer at Royal Holloway, University of London between 1916 and 1918, and briefly also taught at Aberystwyth during the same period. In 1917 he got a position as sixth form master and Head of Department of Civics at the Royal Grammar School, Newcastle. For a period, Davies worked in government administration, as Secretary of the Government Hospitality Fund and other departments, from 1918 to 1929. He was also an editor at the Public Record Office, before being appointed Consultant Archivist at the Monmouthshire County Council, where he established the Monmouthshire County Record Office. During World War II, from 1941 to 1945, he was an archivist at the National Library of Wales. After the war he taught palaeography and diplomatic at Cambridge. He also held honorary positions, such as honorary editor of the Historical Society of the Church in Wales, and honorary consulting archivist to the Church in Wales.

Davies is today best known for his work on late medieval English administrative history, particularly the reign of Edward II. In his 1918 book The Baronial Opposition to Edward II: Its Character and Policy, a Study in Administrative History, he argues that the administration of Edward II, though politically a failure, saw several important innovations in the field of royal administration, particularly through the influence of the king's favourite Hugh Despenser the Younger, and his father Hugh Despenser the elder. The book came out shortly after Thomas Frederick Tout's The Place of the Reign of Edward II in English History (1914), which covered much of the same area. Davies also edited several works with medieval documents, much of this relating to Wales.

== Publications ==
- Davies, James Conway (1918). The Baronial Opposition to Edward II: Its Character and Policy, a Study in Administrative History. London: Cass.
- Davies, James Conway (1940). The Welsh Assize Roll 1277-1284: Assize Roll no 1147. London: Public Record Office.
- Davies, James Conway (1946–1948). Episcopal acts and Cognate Documents Relating to Welsh Dioceses, 1066-1272. Cardiff: Historical Society of the Church in Wales.
- Davies, James Conway; Edward Arthur Lewis (1954). Records of the Court of Augmentations Relating to Wales and Monmouthshire. Cardiff: University of Wales Press.
- Davies, James Conway, ed. (1957). Studies Presented to Sir Hilary Jenkinson. London, New York: Oxford University Press.
- Davies, James Conway, ed. (1960). The Cartae Antiquae Rolls 11-20. London: The Pipe Roll Society.
- Davies, James Conway, ed. (1972). Catalogue of manuscripts in the library of the honourable society of the Inner Temple. London: Oxford University Press.
