= Barbara Craig =

British archaeologist, classicist, and academic

- Born: Barbara Denise Chapman; 22 October 1915; Calcutta, British India
- Died: 25 January 2005 (aged 89)
- Education: Haberdashers' Aske's School for Girls
- Alma mater: Somerville College, Oxford
- Title: Principal of Somerville College, Oxford
- Term: 1967–1980
- Predecessor: Dame Janet Vaughan
- Successor: Daphne Park, Baroness Park of Monmouth
- Spouse: James Craig (m. 1942; died 1989)

Barbara Denise Craig (née Chapman; 22 October 1915 – 25 January 2005) was a British archaeologist, classicist, and academic, specialising in classical pottery. From 1967 to 1980, she was Principal of Somerville College, Oxford.

== Early life ==
She was born on 22 October 1915 in Calcutta, British Raj. Her father was librarian of the Imperial Library of Calcutta (now the National Library of India). In 1920, she moved to London, England, with her mother and siblings; her father remained in India. She was educated at Haberdashers' Aske's School for Girls, a private school in Acton, London.

Having won a scholarship to the University of Oxford, and under the influence of her uncle R. W. Chapman, she matriculated into Somerville College, Oxford in 1934 to study classics. During her degree, she specialised in ancient history and classical archaeology. One of her lecturers was H. T. Wade Gery, who encouraged her interest in ancient history rather than Latin or Greek. She graduated in 1938 with a Bachelor of Arts (BA) degree, having gained first class honours in both Mods and Greats.

== Career ==
Craig's early career suggested a future in academia. After her double first, she was awarded the Craven fellowship and the Goldsmith's senior studentship to fund further study. She then travelled to Italy to undertake research and further study at the British School in Rome. There, she studied the historical background to Greek lyric poetry and the ancient history of Sicily. She spent some time travelling alone in Sicily looking at ancient sites. Having moved away from the regular tourist sites, she found herself in the interior of the island where a large number of Italy's arms factories were based. Unable to convince a police officer that an attractive, young woman with binoculars was not spying in the factories, she was arrested. Luckily for her, the local police chief believed her account of being a tourist and scholar with a passion for birdwatching, and she was released.

With the outbreak of World War II in 1939, she had to return to the United Kingdom. For a year, she worked as a temporary civil servant in the Ministry of Supply and the Ministry of Labour. She then had the opportunity to return to academia. Between 1940 and 1942, she was the assistant to the Professor of Greek at the University of Aberdeen. She then once became a civil servant: she was assistant principal of the Ministry of Home Security and the Ministry of Production. By the end of the war, she held the position of principal.

In 1945, her husband joined the British Council, an organisation that promotes British interests abroad through international education and other opportunities. This was the beginning of two decades spent in various foreign countries, with Barbara acting as hostess at any official occasion. However, she did have time to continue her own interests, in addition to supporting her husband. From 1951 to 1956, while the couple were based in Iraq, she was involved in Max Mallowan's excavation at Nimrud. In 1954, she was elected to the Katharine and Leonard Woolley Fellowship in Archaeology at Somerville College, Oxford, her alma mater. This gave her the funding to carry out research on the relations between Ancient Greece and the Ancient Near East. From 1956, she was involved in excavations at Mycenae under Sir Alan Wace, then under William Taylour. As she was not a trained field archaeologist, her main contributions were the classification of pottery. She was greatly skilled at this and became an expert in Mycenaean pottery.

In 1965, the couple finally returned to the United Kingdom and set up a permanent home in London. She continued her involvement in archaeological excavations at Mycenae and in Laconia, Greece, during the summer months. In February 1966, she was elected Principal of Somerville College, Oxford. She took up the appointment in October 1967, succeeding Dame Janet Vaughan. Under her leadership, the college doubled in size and rose to the top of the Norrington Table, the annual ranking of colleges by degree classification. The college celebrated its centenary in 1979, and she used the opportunity to fund raise. She retired in 1980 and was appointed an honorary fellow of Somerville College.

== Personal life ==
She met her future husband, James Craig, when they were both at the British School at Rome in 1938; she was studying and he was the BSR's secretary and librarian. They married in 1942. A serious road accident in 1986 left her husband disabled and using a wheelchair. She cared for him until his death in 1989. They did not have any children.

She was a Christian and a practising Anglican.

Academic offices
Preceded by Janet Vaughan	Principal; Somerville College, Oxford; 1967 to 1980	Succeeded by Daphne Park, Baroness Park of Monmouth
