= Oliver Wendell Holmes (archivist) =

American archivist (1902–1981)

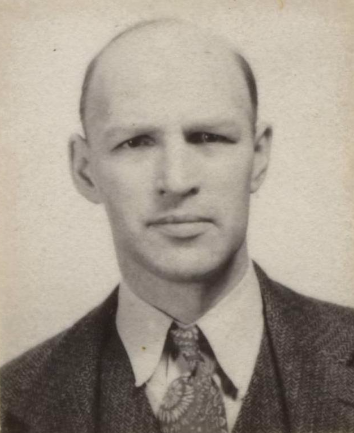
- From Holmes' National Archives identification card, 1941.
- Born: February 2, 1902; Saint Paul, Minnesota, USA
- Died: November 25, 1981 (aged 79); Washington, D.C., USA
- Resting place: Swede Bottom Cemetery, Houston, Minnesota, USA
- Education: Carleton College; Columbia University
- Occupations: Archivist, National Archives; Director, National Historical Publications Commission

Oliver Wendell Holmes (February 2, 1902 – November 25, 1981) was an American archivist and historian, who served as executive director of the National Historical Publications Commission from 1961 to 1971.

== Background ==
Holmes was born in Saint Paul, Minnesota to Swedish-born parents, and was raised on a farm in the southeastern part of the state. In 1922, he received his B.A. from Carleton College in Northfield, Minnesota. He received a Ph.D. in history at Columbia University in 1956. His area of expertise was the history of transportation in the American western frontier.

While in school at Columbia he began working as an encyclopedia writer and, later, staff of the National Archives, delaying the completion of his degree.

== Career ==
Holmes began working for the National Archives when it was founded in 1935. His positions there included chief of the Interior Department archives from 1938 to 1941, director of research and records description from 1942 to 1945, program advisor from 1946 to 1948, chief of the Natural Resources Records Branch from 1948 to 1961, and executive director of the National Historical Publications Commission from 1961 to his retirement in 1972.

Beginning in the 1930s, he published many articles in The American Archivist. He was also published in the Society of American Archivists' Journal and the Southwestern Historical Quarterly.

== Affiliations ==
Holmes was also deeply involved in professional service, and was a founding member of the Society of American Archivists (SAA). He served in many capacities with the SSA and was its president in 1958 through 1959 In 1978, Howard University Press published his book, Indian-Related Records in the National Archives and their Use.

He was a founding member of the Potomac Corral of Westerners and a member of the Western History Association, the Columbia Historical Society (now the Historical Society of Washington, D.C.), and the Cosmos Club.

== Honors ==
Holmes won the Waldo Gifford Leland Prize for his presidential address for the Society of American Archivists. In 1979, SSA created the Holmes Fund in his honor and to enable foreign archivists to come to U.S. repositories. In 1980, the Western History Association gave his an Award of Merit, for "his important contributions to the field."

== Personal ==
Holmes was married to the former Dorothy Behner, who predeceased six months before him.
