= Rules for Archival Description =

Archival descriptive standard

The Rules for Archival Description (RAD) is the Canadian archival descriptive standard. It provides a set of rules based on traditional archival principles, whose purpose is to provide a consistent and commonly shared descriptive foundation for describing archival materials within a given fonds. RAD was first published in 1990 after being developed by the Bureau of Canadian Archivists' (BCA) Planning Committee on Descriptive Standards. It is currently overseen by the Canadian Committee on Archival Description of the Canadian Council of Archives. RAD was last revised in 2008.

== General framework ==
Similar in structure to AACR2, RAD provides archivists with a framework for generating archival descriptions and finding aids. It is a multi-level descriptive metadata standard structured to reflect the context of a group of records based on the manner in which they were created, used, and managed.

RAD takes a top-down approach to archival description, beginning with a general description of the records at the fonds-level and becoming more specific as description progresses at lower levels. Completed descriptions vary in depth, but often include a biographical sketch about the creator of the records, information about the physical extent of the material, and an overview – in the form of a scope and content note – about what the archival fonds consists of.

== Six levels of description ==
RAD designates six levels of description, which are arranged in a hierarchical nature. The fonds represents the broadest level of description and the top of the hierarchical tree, and the item representing the lowest level of description.

The six levels of description detailed in RAD, as explained by the Saskatchewan Council for Archives and Archivists (SCAA), are:

1. The fonds: The broadest intellectual unit of description, which is the collective of all records created by a single entity.
2. The sous-fonds: Described in the same manner as the fonds. The sous-fonds contains all records of a sub-unit of the organization that created the fonds.
3. The series: A group of records within a fonds or sous-fonds, which are created or gathered from the same subject, entity, or function, all sharing some relationship that is related to their creation or usage. The series is the link between the records created with the fonds.
4. The sub-series: Described in the same manner as the series. A sub-series contains records within a series that are easily identified as being dependent on the basis of classification or content.
5. The file: Consists of documents that were filed together in order to reflect the same subject or activity, along with containing the same title. A file is not to be confused with a folder, which is considered a document storage unit, while the file is an intellectual level of description. A single file may contain an undisclosed number of folders.
6. The item: The item represents the lowest level of description, and the smallest intellectual entity contained in a fonds. As a result of the item being an intellectual unit, it may hold a number of individual things.

== RAD Elements ==
Descriptions within the RAD framework are composed of what is called an element. There are various elements that contain specific types of information about both the record and the creating entity, and these elements are listed within a specific order. While these elements are listed within a specific order within a description, RAD allows for flexibility in how the order of elements is presented since it does not specify any standard presentation of information.

=== Required elements ===
Title, dates, extent, administrative history, biographical sketch, and scope and content are required RAD elements:

- Title (Rule 1.1)
- Dates (Rule 1.4)
- Extent (Rule 1.5)
- Administrative History (Rule 1.7B1)
- Biographical Sketch (Rule 1.7B2)
- Scope and Content (Rule 1.7D)

=== Additional elements ===
As per the SCAA, six additional elements should also be considered for a basic RAD description:

- Custodial History (Rule 1.7C)
- Source of Supplied Title (Rule 1.8B2)
- Physical Description (Rule 1.8B9)
- Arrangement Note (Rule 1.8B13)
- Restrictions (Rule 1.8B16)
- Accruals (Rule 1.8B19)

== See also ==
- ISAD(G)
- Records in Contexts
- Describing Archives: A Content Standard
- Encoded Archival Description
- Manual of Archival Description
- International Standard Archival Authority Record
- Archival processing
- Finding aid
