= Saskatchewan Council for Archives and Archivists =

The Saskatchewan Council of Archives and Archivists is an organization which represents archives and related heritage institutions in the province of Saskatchewan, Canada. The Council consists of 58 members from across the Province including municipal, Aboriginal, religious, cultural, and other archival institutions.
