= Terry Eastwood =

Canadian archivist

Terence M. Eastwood (born 1943) is best known for his pioneering roles in archival education internationally and the creation of archival descriptive standards in Canada. He has published widely on a number of topics of importance to the development of archival theory and has lectured and presented throughout the world. His work supervising archival studies students helped craft a whole new generation of archivists who themselves have gone on to make important contributions to the field.

== Education and career ==
Terry Eastwood received a Bachelor of Arts (BA) in History and French from the University of Alberta in 1965. He followed his BA with a Diploma in Education in Secondary studies from the University of Victoria in 1972 and a Master of Arts in History from the University of Alberta in 1977. Eastwood taught at a number of schools, including Taihape College in Taihape, New Zealand in 1966 and several secondary schools in British Columbia from 1967 to 1973. In 1973 he left the world of secondary education to become an archivist working in the Manuscripts and Government Records Division at the Provincial Archives of British Columbia. He also served as the secretary of the Public Documents Committee. He remained at the Provincial Archives until 1981 and then made a move that would prove pivotal to both his career and the development of graduate archival education in Canada and the world by starting the first autonomous archival studies program in North America at the University of British Columbia (UBC).

Eastwood was appointed Assistant Professor of Archival Studies at UBC from 1981 to 1986, becoming Associate Professor in 1986. He served as Chair of the program from 1981 to 2000. His teaching specialties include: the juridical context of archives (the various laws affecting generation, maintenance, use, and disposition of archives, and the role of archives in democratic accountability); arrangement and description of archives; appraisal of archives, including appraisal of electronic records; the history and development of archival institutions and the archival profession; and public services and programs of archival institutions. He has supervised 73 graduate students to date. He also served as a co-investigator in the InterPARES Project from 1999–2006.

In addition to his principal duties as Chair of the Archival Studies program at UBC, Eastwood has also taught at a number of institutions and provided a variety of educational opportunities, such as the Western Archives Institute at Salt Lake City in Utah in 2001 and the University of California at Berkeley in 2009, a course on description for the Association of Brazilian Archivists in Rio de Janeiro, Brazil, in 2008, a pre-congress seminar on Records Disposition at the International Congress on Archives in Montreal, Quebec, in 1992 and one on Arrangement and Description of Archives in Koblenz, Germany, in 1990. From 1996 to 1999 he was a guest professor at the Division of Communications and Humanities, Mid Sweden University (Mittuniversitetet), in Härnösand, Sweden.

== Professional activities ==
Eastwood participated in the formation of the Association of British Columbia Archivists, serving as its first Secretary-Treasurer from 1974–1976, the editor of the Association's first five newsletters, and its President from 1976–1977. On the national scene, Eastwood was General Editor of Archivaria, the scholarly journal of the Association of Canadian Archivists, from 1981 to 1982, as well as Vice-President (1977–1978) and President (1978–1979) of the association. He consulted on archival education at the University of Melbourne, Faculty of Arts, and the University of Western Australia, Department of History, in 1989 during a tour of Australia sponsored by the Australian Society of Archivists. He acted as Co-chair of the Working Group on Archival Descriptive Standards of the Bureau of Canadian Archivists from 1984–1986. The Working Group was funded by the Social Sciences and Humanities Research Council of Canada to study and report on the development of standards for the description and indexing of archival material to improve scholarly access. Eastwood was also a member of the Planning Committee on Descriptive Standards of the Bureau of Canadian Archivists from 1991-1996. The Committee was responsible for producing the Rules for Archival Description, finalized in 1996, which constitute a bilingual national standard in Canada.

== Awards and distinctions ==
Eastwood was made a Fellow of the Society of American Archivists in 1990 and the Association of Canadian Archivists in 2007. He was presented with a Twenty-years Service Award from the Archives Association of British Columbia in 1993, and made an Honorary Member of the association in 2007.

== Significance and legacy ==
The masters of archival studies offered at the University of British Columbia in 1981 was the first program dedicated to the study of archival science in North America. Eastwood, as the first professor and later chair of the program, developed an appropriate curriculum, obtained the support of the Canadian and international archival profession, trained and mentored hundreds of students and lectured and wrote widely on the topic of the necessity for archival education. The latter was a particularly vigorous fight; many archivists who had library or history degrees and who had on-the-job training opposed the increased emphasis on dedicated masters level archival education.

The report Towards Descriptive Standards: Report and Recommendations of the Canadian Working Group on Archival Descriptive Standards, which Eastwood co-edited with Jean Dryden in 1985, is a classic text, required reading for anyone interested in the development of standards in Canada. As a member of the Planning Committee on Descriptive Standards Eastwood contributed to a work of collaborative intellectual effort, and the product of the committee, the Rules for Archival Description, has made a significant impact on the archival profession nationally and internationally and on institutional practice in Canada and elsewhere.

Through his writings, consultations, and international teaching, Eastwood advocated for the improvement of the development of archival education in universities the world over.

To date Eastwood has published over 50 articles on arrangement and description, appraisal, archives and accountability, the history of archival institutions and other subjects in a wide variety of journals and written and edited a number of seminal books on archival theory and practice. These have contributed substantially to the development of archival science.

== Selected bibliography ==
- "Archives, Democratic Accountability, and Truth,” Cheryl Avery and Mona Holmlund, eds. Better off Forgetting? Essays on Archives, Public Policy, and Collective Memory. University of Toronto Press, 2010.
- “A Contested Realm: the Nature of Archives and the Orientation of Archival Science,’” in Currents of Archival Thinking, edited by Heather MacNeil and Terry Eastwood, Westport, CT: Libraries Unlimited, 2009.
- “Recent Trends in the Description of Archives in Canada,” In The Power and Passion of Archives: A Festschrift in Honour of Kent Haworth. Marion Beyea, Reuben Ware, and Cheryl Avery, eds. Saskatoon: Association of Canadian Archivists, 2005, 225-35. ISBN 1-895382-26-2
- “Choosing to Preserve: The Selection of Electronic Records.” Part Two in The Long-Term Preservation of Authentic Electronic Records: Findings of the InterPARES Project. Luciana Duranti, ed. San Miniato, Italy: Archilab, 2005, 67–98.
- “Introduction to the 2003 Reissue.” In Selected Writings of Sir Hilary Jenkinson. Roger H. Ellis and Peter Walne eds., with a new introduction by Terence M. Eastwood. Chicago: The Society of American Archivists, 2003, vii – xx. ISBN 1-931666-03-2
- Luciana Duranti, Terry Eastwood, and Heather MacNeil. Preservation of the Integrity of Electronic Records. Dordrecht: Kluwer Academic Publishers, 2002. ISBN 1-4020-0991-7
- “Archival Research: The University of British Columbia Experience.” American Archivist. 63 (Spring 2000): 243–57.
- “How Goes it with Appraisal?” Archivaria. 36 (Autumn 1993): 111–121.
- “Reflections on the Development of Archives in Canada and Australia.” In Archival Documents: Providing Accountability Through Recordkeeping, Sue McKemmish and Frank Upward, eds. Melbourne: Ancora Press, 1993, 27-39. ISBN 0-86862-017-3
- “Unity and Diversity in the Development of Archival Science in North America.” In Studi sull’Archivistica, Elio Lodolini, ed. Rome: Bulzoni Editore, 1992, 87-100.
- “Towards a Social Theory of Appraisal.” In The Archival Imagination: Essays in Honour of Hugh A. Taylor, Barbara L. Craig, ed. Ottawa: Association of Canadian Archivists, 1992, 71-89. ISBN 1-895382-06-8
- Eastwood, Terry, ed. The Archival Fonds: From Theory to Practice/Le Fonds d’archives: de la théorie à la pratique. Ottawa: Bureau of Canadian Archivists, 1992. Contains general introduction by the editor, pp. 1–29. ISBN 0-9690797-6-1.
- “Going Nowhere in Particular: The Association of Canadian Archivists Ten Years After its Founding.” Archivaria. 21 (Winter 1985-86): 186–190.
- Eastwood Terry and Jean Dryden, eds. Toward Descriptive Standards: Report and Recommendations of the Canadian Working Group on Archival Descriptive Standards. Ottawa: Bureau of Canadian Archivists, (1985). ISBN 0-88925-680-2
- “Cooperating to Create the Basis for Archival Information Exchange in Canada.” In Planning for Canadian Archives, Marion Beyea and Marcel Caya, eds. Ottawa: Bureau of Canadian Archivists, 1983, 102-119. ISBN 0-7717-0098-9
