= Archivaria =

- Discipline: Archival science
- Language: English, French
- Edited by: Rebecka Sheffield

Publication details
- History: 1975–present
- Publisher: Association of Canadian Archivists (Canada)
- Frequency: Biannually

Standard abbreviations
- ISO 4: Archivaria

Indexing
- ISSN: 0318-6954 (print); 1923-6409 (web)
- LCCN: 84643294
- OCLC no.: 03247908

Links
- Journal homepage

Archivaria is a biannual peer-reviewed academic journal published by the Association of Canadian Archivists (ACA), covering the scholarly investigation of archives, including the history, nature, theory, and use of archives. The journal contains essays, case studies, in-depth perspectives, book reviews, and exhibition reviews.

The first issue (Winter 1975 - 1976) appeared shortly after the ACA was established in 1975. Volume numbering discontinued with v. 1, no. 2 (Summer 1976) and went to issue numbers only, i.e. no. 3 (Winter 1976–1977).

== Content ==
Topics covered have included: the history of archives; individual archivists and archival trends; the analysis of record-keeping practices over time and space; various media and their evolution and characteristics; theoretical problems; practical solutions; new fields of history (and related disciplines), and new kinds of documentation being explored by users; legal and ethical concerns; new technological developments; the relationship of archivists to other information management professionals; and so on.

== Awards for writers ==
There are three awards given for articles published in Archivaria:

- The W. Kaye Lamb Award was established in 1983 and is awarded annually to honor the author of an Archivaria article that most advances archival thinking in Canada. It is the senior award of the journal for the best article overall.
- The Hugh A. Taylor Award was created in 2006 and is awarded annually to the author of an Archivaria article that presents "new ideas or refreshing syntheses in the most imaginative way, especially by exploring the implications of concepts or trends from other disciplines for archival thinking and activity, and by extending the boundaries of archival theory in new directions."
- The Gordon Dodds Prize, established in 2011, recognizes superior research and writing on an archival topic by a student enrolled in a master's level archival studies program at a Canadian university.

== Accessibility ==
Indexes to articles appeared in issue number 12 covering number 1 (1976) to 10 (1980) and issue number 22 covering numbers 11 (1980) to 20 (1985). The publication of occasional articles, exhibition reviews and so on in French began from the very first issue of Archivaria in 1976 under general editor Peter Bower. In an effort to provide greater access to articles in English for Francophone speakers, Archivaria began publishing abstracts of each article in French beginning with the Autumn 1993 issue, under general editor Jay Atherton. Issue number 59, in 2005, focused on Quebec's perspective on archival science and featured a number of articles translated from the original French into English.

In 2005–2006, ACA and Simon Fraser University Library digitized all past issues of Archivaria for free viewing by the public, using Open Journal Systems software. Archivaria continued after 2006 as an electronic publication in addition to print, however the eight most recent issues of the online version are viewable only by subscribers and ACA members. The journal's predecessor, The Canadian Archivist, which was published from 1963 to 1974, has also been put online.

== Indexing ==
In 2010, Archivaria was rated A* by the Australian Research Council Research Excellence exercise.

== See also ==
- Archival science
