= Encoded Archival Context =

Encoded Archival Context – Corporate bodies, Persons and Families (EAC-CPF) is an XML standard for encoding information about the creators of archival materials – i.e., a corporate body, person or family -- including their relationships to (a) resources (books, collections, papers, etc.) and (b) other corporate bodies, persons, and families. The goal is to provide contextual information regarding the circumstances of record creation and use. EAC-CPF can be used in conjunction with Encoded Archival Description (EAD) for enhancement of EAD's capabilities in encoding finding aids, but can also be used in conjunction with other standards or for standalone authority file encoding.

EAC-CPF is defined in a document type definition as well as in an XML schema and a Relax NG schema. EAC-CPF elements reflect the International Standard Archival Authority Record standard and the General International Standard Archival Description, two standards managed by the International Council on Archives.

EAC-CPF has been and is being tested in various institutions, such as the European Union LEAF project, 'Linking and Exploring Authority Files', funded between 2001 and 2004.

The Ad Hoc EAC-CPF Working Group's early drafts were published in 2004. and the working group released a draft for public comment in August 2009. prior to publication of the completed standard in 2010.

== See also ==
- ISAD(G)
- Records in Contexts
- Describing Archives: A Content Standard
- Encoded Archival Description
- Manual of Archival Description
- International Standard Archival Authority Record
- Archival processing
- Finding aid
