= Archives Hub =

The Archives Hub
- Parent company: Jisc
- Status: Free online discovery service for UK archives
- Founded: 1998
- Country of origin: United Kingdom
- Distribution: Covers the UK and Isle of Man
- Nonfiction topics: Multi-disciplinary
- Official website: archiveshub.jisc.ac.uk

The Archives Hub is a Jisc service, and is freely available to all. It provides a cross-search of descriptions of archives held across the United Kingdom, in over 400 institutions, including universities, colleges, specialist repositories, charities, businesses and other institutions. It includes over 1,000,000 descriptions of archive materials on all manner of subjects, which represents over 30,000 archive collections. It also describes content available through topic-based websites, often created as a result of digitisation projects.

The Hub does not hold archives. Rather, it maintains finding aids, which help researchers to locate archives, by enabling them to search across descriptions. Each description provides a direct email link to the contact details for the repository that holds the archive. It enables researchers to search and filter by various criteria including keyword, title, creator, person, organisation, subject and date in order to bring together archives held all over the country that relate to a topic. It includes images and links to digital content, and enables filtering by digital or non-digital content. Descriptions can be navigated via a table of contents and a "search within" function.

Contributors provide new and updated descriptions regularly, so the service is constantly updated with descriptions of archives that have been newly catalogued and made available for research.

The Archives Hub has supporting information for researchers, including an introductory guide. It publishes monthly features, created by contributors, on all manner of subjects, people and organisations, to showcase the variety of archival content described.

The Archives Hub has an ethos based on open access and "making the data work harder". The Hub has recently developed "micro sites", which are repository interfaces available to higher education institutions wanting their own search application for descriptions stored on the Hub. It also provides data to the Archives Portal Europe.

Descriptions on the Hub are standards-based, using ISAD(G), the international archival standard, and other standards for data such as languages, dates and index terms standards. It takes in and provides EAD (Encoded Archival Description), which is XML for archives. The site provides information for archivists and other cataloguers on online discovery, data creation, the use of standards, metadata and protocols for interoperability and to facilitate cross-searching.
