= Navigational Aids for the History of Science, Technology, and the Environment Project =

The Navigational Aids for the History of Science, Technology, and the Environment Project (NAHSTE) was a research archives/manuscripts cataloguing project based at the University of Edinburgh. Following a proposal led by Arnott Wilson in 1999, the project received £261,755 funding from the Research Support Libraries Programme (RSLP) from 2000 until 2002.

The project was designed to access a variety of outstanding collections of archives and manuscripts held at the three partner Higher Education Institutions (HEIs); the University of Edinburgh, University of Glasgow and Heriot-Watt University and to make them accessible on the Internet. The project additionally included linkages to related records held by non-HEI collaborators.

Descriptions of the material conform to ISAD(G) (Second edition), whilst information about key individuals conform to ISAAR(CPF). Catalogues were tagged using the Encoded Archival Description XML standard.

Although the project was completed in 2002, the resulting web service continues to be hosted at Edinburgh.
