= AtoM (archival software) =

- Original author(s): Artefactual
- Stable release: 2.9.2 / 2025-06-26
- Preview release: accesstomemory.org/en/download/
- Repository: github.com/artefactual/atom
- Written in: PHP
- Operating system: Linux
- Available in: Multilingual
- License: AGPL 3
- Website: accesstomemory.org

The AtoM (previously ICA-AtoM) is a project originated by the International Council on Archives (ICA) that aimed to provide free license software that allows institutions to disseminate their archival holdings on the web. Its last version in collaboration with the ICA was Release 1.3.2. As of October 2013, with version 2.0, the AToM project remained in the hands of the company Artefactual Systems without the ICA.

Among the most notable features is the customization of the website through different templates that can display up to six different types of pages. Another of its features is the management of up to five types of user profiles, each of which responds to different access options and permissions in the execution of queries and tasks. Finally, one of the most interesting features is the possibility of exporting and importing records based on ISAD (G) standards in XML and EAD.

== History ==
The technical development of the software was prepared by the Canadian company Artefactual Systems (under the sponsorship/support of the ICA). The program was part of a UNESCO initiative to enable access to human rights archives. The functionalities they provided acquired an important character such as those of an archival information system, called OSARIS (Open Source Archival Resource Information System), developed by the Committee on Information Technology of the ICA in 2003 under the supervision of Peter Horsman.

In 2005, funding was obtained from the UNESCO program to create a database and develop an open source system based on ICA standards. In 2006 the prototype was formed, and it was not until 2008 when version 1.0 was created (it began in the beta phase). However, it was not until 2010 when the first stable and open version 1.1 was presented.

From then on, development continued without the ICA, so the software was renamed AtoM. The latest stable version is 2.8.0, dated February 27, 2024.

== Main functionality ==
The AtoM tool is composed of two parts: a descriptor management part and the other part deals with query for (end) users. It also contains other improvements, such as:

- Persistent links for descriptions, authority records, functions, files, digital objects, and static pages.
- Import and export EAC-CPF (Encoded Archival Context for Corporate Bodies, Persons, and Families) and SKOS (Simple Knowledge Organization System) records.
- Improvements in the user interface to complete the date, help message and search for new records and with their respective modifications.
- Automatic Updates.

=== Uses ===
The software is developed on MySQL and PHP. The program allows you to manage a multi-level description repository as well as authority and context records, functionalities and descriptions of the centers (the descriptions of the different centers are maintained in the same database).

== Design ==
=== Backend ===
Left	Center	Footer	Header
Institution Name: Description of the institution name; Import and export: import (XML AND CSV) and export (Dublin Core 1.1 XML and EAD 2002 XML) capabilities; Navigation menu; Description level	In the center there is all the information of the record that is organized according to the archival regulations that the record has been made.	Edit; Delete; Add new; Double; Move; Link digital object; Import digital object; Link storage unit	At the top is the search bar that allows you to consult the records saved in the database

=== Frontend ===
The user interface is one in which the user only has the consultation option, that is, they do not have administration privileges. In AtoM the user interface is used to present web pages that usually have a relationship with some file.

== Standards ==
AtoM is based on the descriptive standards of the International Council on Archives:

- General International Standard Archival Description (ISAD(G)) - 2nd edition, 1999
- International Standard Archival Authority Record (Corporate bodies, Persons, Families) (ISAAR(CPF)) - 2nd edition, 2003
- International Standard For Describing Institutions with Archival Holdings (SDIAH]: 1st edition, March 2008
- International Standard For Describing Functions (ISDF) - 1st edition, May 2007

ICA-AtoM is compatible with the Simple Knowledge Organization System (SKOS): W3C Recommendation of August 18, 2009.

ICA-AtoM is designed to be flexible enough to adapt to other descriptive standards.

== See also ==
- Encoded Archival Description (EAD)
- ISAD(G)
- Simple Knowledge Organization System
