= More Product, Less Process =

2005 scholarly archival science article

"More Product, Less Process: Revamping Traditional Archival Processing" is a 2005 archival science article written by Mark A. Greene and Dennis Meissner that first appeared in the Fall/Winter 2005 issue of The American Archivist. The paper argues that traditional archival processing is too slow, and advocates for the use of minimal processing in order to reduce backlogs and provide access to archival collections as quickly as possible. The ideology presented in the article, abbreviated as MPLP, has since been widely adopted in modern archival theory with subsequent praise directed primarily towards the ability to increase user accessibility without prohibiting the option for future processing.

== Article summary ==
=== Call to action ===
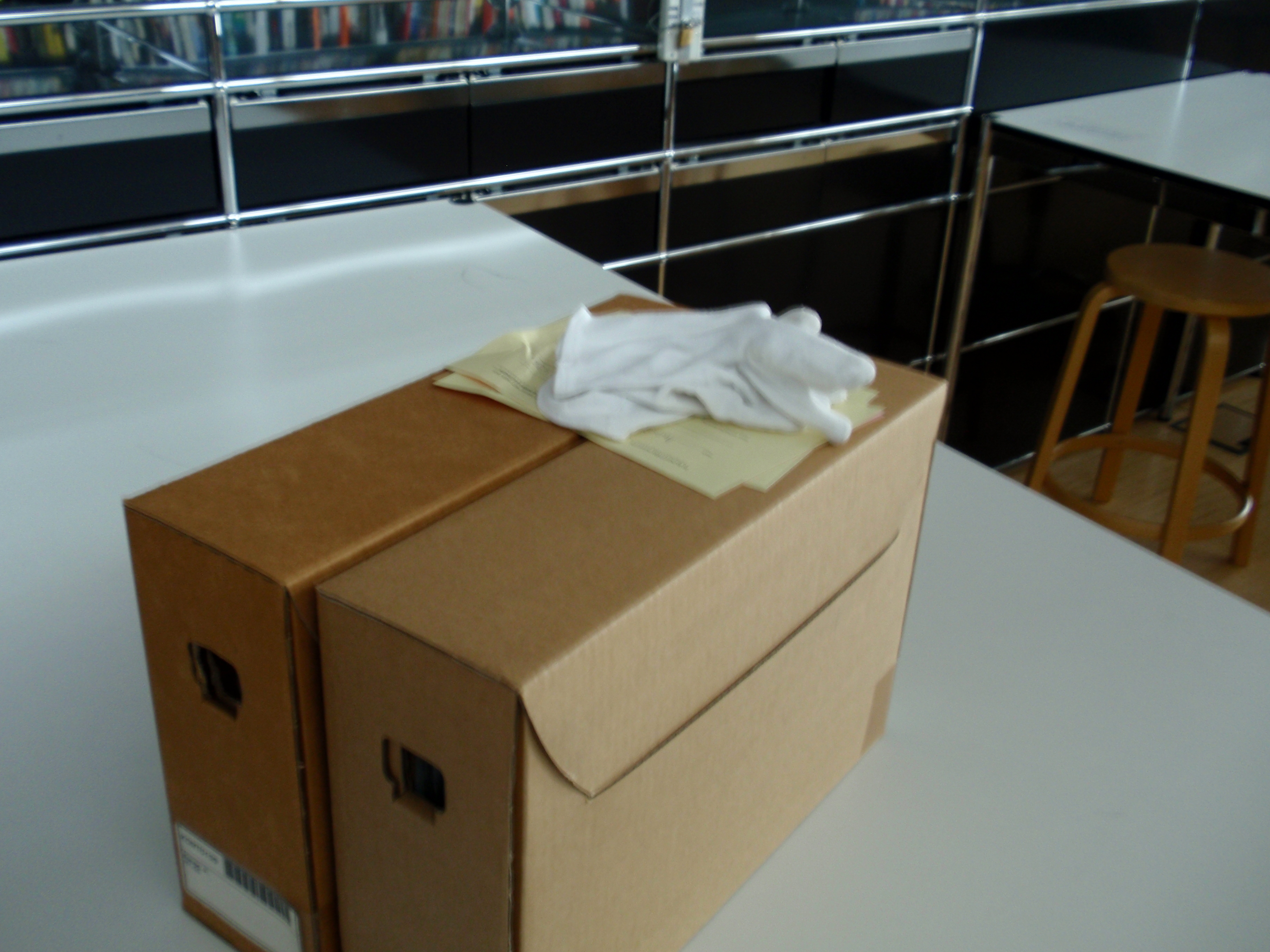
Archival storage boxes

Greene and Meissner begin the article with a call to action, citing the British report Best Value and Local Authority Archives, which claims that archival cataloging, arrangement, and description are "not working" and that growing backlogs are "weakening the archival profession". The authors hypothesize that "processing projects squander scarce resources", and that it is thus necessary to entirely reframe the discussion about processing rather than simply suggesting a new processing technique. Their methodology included a literature review, an overview of National Historical Publications and Records Commission (NHPRC) grants, two surveys, and examination of other relevant studies.

Greene and Meissner discuss what they perceive to be problems with processing and cite a 1998 Association of Research Libraries (ARL) survey of special collections units which found that nearly a third of manuscript collections made up uncatalogued backlogs.

The authors present a new set of guidelines for arrangement, preservation, and description:

1. Expediting the availability of collections to users;
2. Assuring adequate arrangement of materials for users' needs;
3. Taking the minimum steps necessary for physically preserving collection materials;
4. Describing materials sufficiently for use.

=== Major findings ===
The authors argue that arrangement at the item level is not necessary and instead emphasize the importance of creating finding aids for collections instead. The authors then discuss the rate at which archivists are able to process collections, citing a 1982 study by Karen Temple Lynch and Thomas E. Lynch that put the figure at 12.7 hours per cubic foot. Further citing a study by the Billy Graham Center Archives that found the cost of processing as high as 15.1 hours and $374 per foot, Greene and Meissner lament that with regard to processing, archivists "have utterly failed to come to grips with a critical administrative reality, a reality that eats 90 percent of our direct program expenditures".

The authors propose five major findings from their research:

1. Arrangement was still often at the item level;
2. Only 51% of repositories were regularly putting finding aids online;
3. While most repositories have some preservation considerations, very few do it consistently;
4. Repositories were not responding to the challenges presented by backlogs;
5. Many of the repositories store their collections in appropriate temperature and relative humidity conditions, but still feel the need to remove metal fasteners (which the authors argue is unnecessary).

=== Principles for change ===
Recognizing that tradeoffs must be made, Greene and Meissner argue that some preservation concerns must be given up for the sake of providing effective access to users of collections.

They then present their "principles for change" as recommendations for archivists:

- The Golden Minimum: to reach the processing requirements of current and future users at the most basic level.
- Arrangement: As opposed to organization of individual items, arranging collections at the series and folder levels simplifies and facilitates research for prospective users.
- Description: to embody the materials, provide context and access information to the user, and reflect the level of arrangement.
- Preservation: Modern climate controlled storage can be trusted to preserve materials following minimalist processing.
- Policies: “Unprocessed collections should be presumed open to researchers. Period.”
- Metrics: Consistency must be established at the most basic acceptable level among all aspects of archival processing.

"More Product, Less Process" concludes that because greater funding and resources are not forthcoming, archivists must "change the way we process so that we can, with our existing resources, roughly triple the speed with which we process". The authors acknowledge the difficulty of their prospective changes, similar issues that librarians face, and the innovative processing work done at institutions including Arizona State University, Yale University, Marquette University, the University of Central Florida, the University of Montana, and the Wisconsin Historical Society.

== Influence and reception ==
The minimal processing approach advocated by "More Product, Less Process" has been implemented by many archives and libraries, including but not limited to the Library of Congress, the University of North Carolina's Wilson Library, and the Academic Health Center Archives at the University of Minnesota. Greene and Meissner's article has been highly influential within the archival community, and it has inspired multiple series of presentations, seminars, workshops, and webinars on minimal processing. Emphasis has been drawn towards the argument's devotion to combating extensive backlogs and rethinking archival processing. The University of South Carolina' libraries' blog cites their collection of the papers of Environmentalist, Inc. as a product of MPLP through its lack of thorough processing, but extensive availability to the public. The article has also inspired the name of "More Podcast, Less Process", an archives-related podcast hosted by Jefferson Bailey of the Metropolitan New York Library Council and Joshua Ranger of AudioVisual Preservation Solutions.

Prior to Mark Greene's death in 2017, the authors continued to expand their original thesis, notably in a 2010 Journal of Archival Organization article that amplifies their resource allocation argument and directly rebuts a variety of critics.

Criticism of "More Product, Less Process" has been primarily directed towards its perceived broadness, lenience, and reductive perspective. One piece argues MPLP's poor application to item level digitization and notes the ambiguity of relying on relative importance and condition to determine processing priority. A 2015 article in The American Archivist criticizes MPLP as overtly negative and negligent towards the values of preservation and argues that the philosophy places collections themselves at risk. Greene and Meissner's response reiterates their argument and the opportunity cost relationship of processing and user access.

== See also ==
- Archival science
- Archival processing
- Fonds
