= Manuscript =

Document written by hand

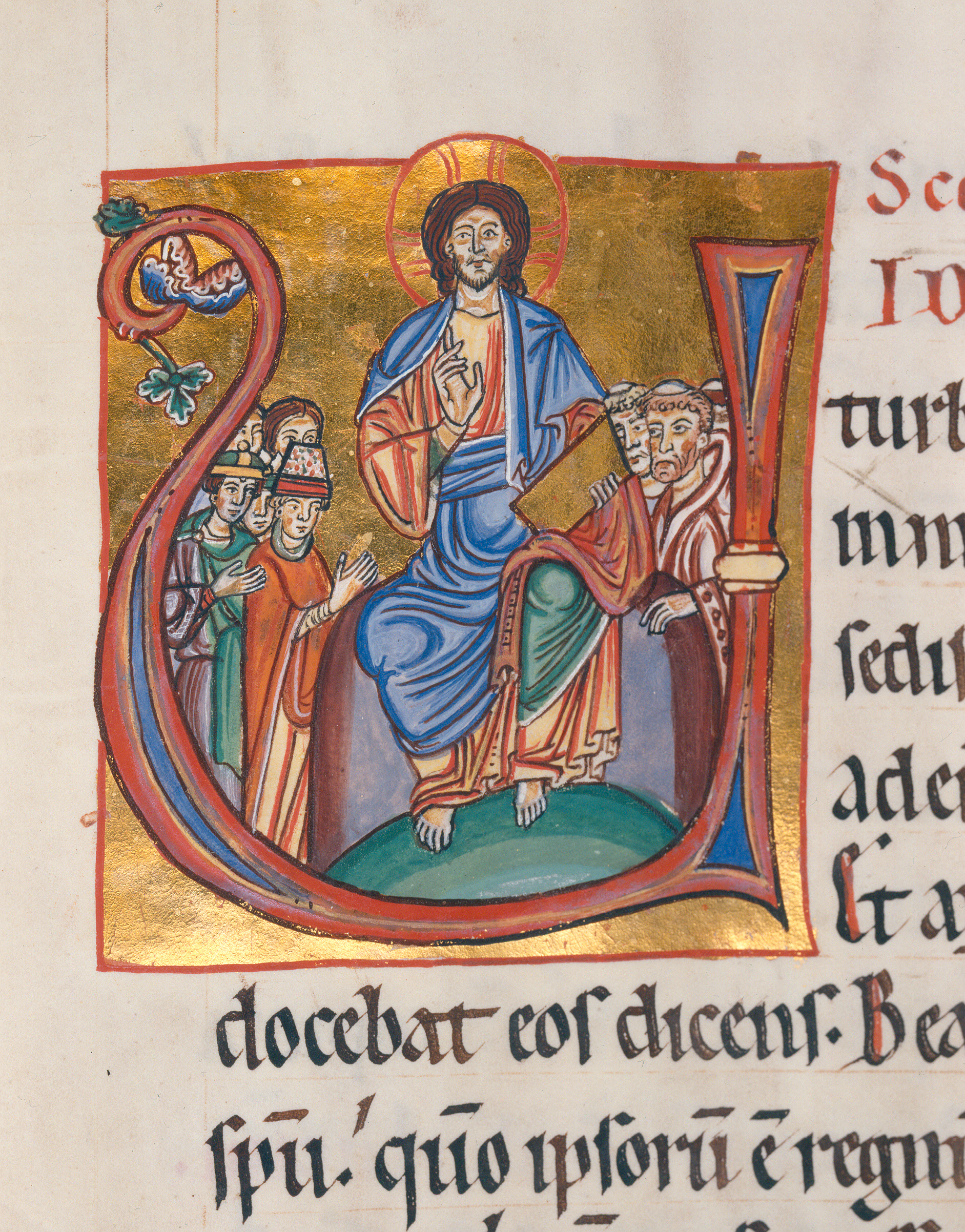
Christ Pantocrator seated in a capital "U" in an illuminated manuscript from the Badische Landesbibliothek, Germany (from c. 1220)

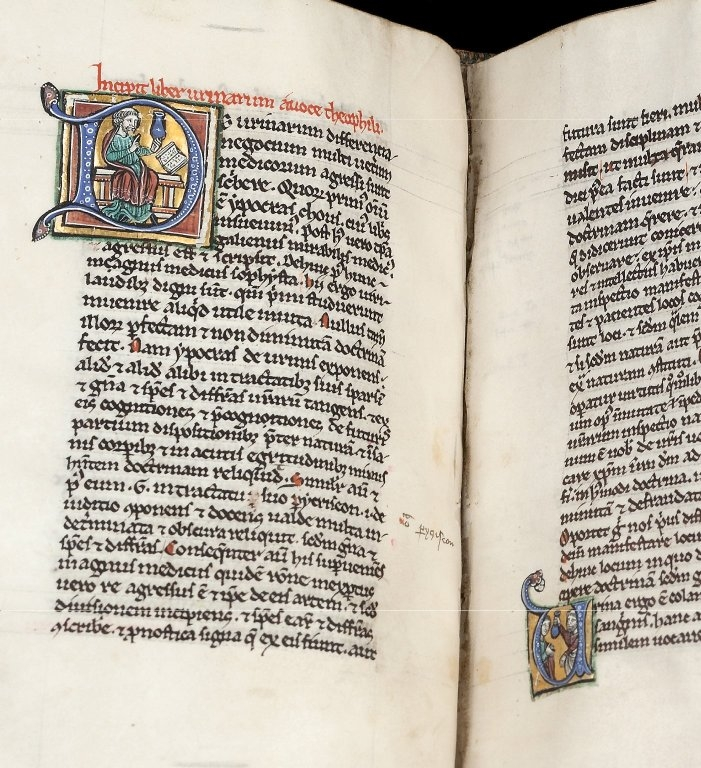
Image of two facing pages of the illuminated manuscript of "Isagoge", fols. 42b and 43a. On the top of the left hand page is an illuminated letter "D" – initial of "De urinarum differencia negocium" (The matter of the differences of urines). Inside the letter is a picture of a master on bench pointing at a raised flask while lecturing on the "Book on urines" of Theophilus. The right hand page is only shown in part. On its very bottom is an illuminated letter "U" – initial of "Urina ergo est colamentum sanguinis" (Urine is thus the filtrate of the blood). Inside the letter is a picture of a master holding up a flask while explaining the diagnostic significance of urine to a student or a patient. HMD Collection, MS E 78.

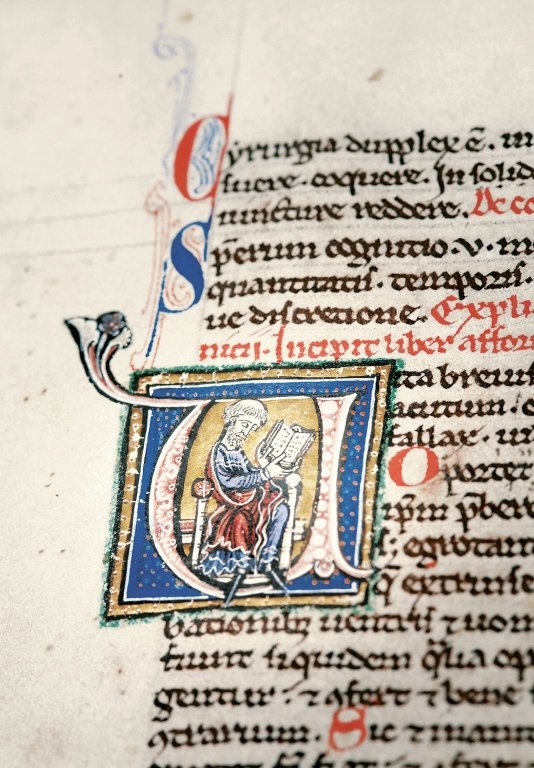
Inside the letter is a picture of a master in cathedra expounding on the Aphorisms of Hippocrates. Initial "V" rendered as "U" of "Vita brevis, ars vero longa", or "Life is short, but the art is long". "Isagoge", fol. 15b. HMD Collection, MS E 78.

A manuscript is any text written by hand as opposed to mechanically printed or reproduced using automated printing technologies. Texts that are mechanically printed and bound are called books.

Modern usage of the word manuscript has expanded to include the original, unpublished copy of an author's work, regardless of the technology (typewriter, word processor, etc.) used by the author to create the work.

Manuscripts may combine writing with mathematical calculations, maps, music notation, diagrams, or illustrations.

== Terminology ==
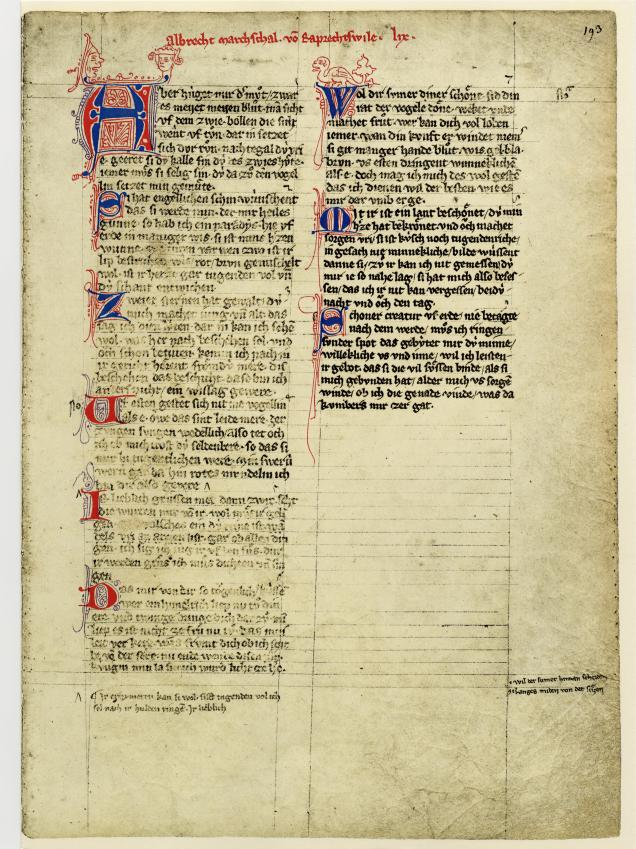
Manuscript, Codex Manesse. Most manuscripts were ruled with horizontal lines that served as the baselines on which the text was entered.

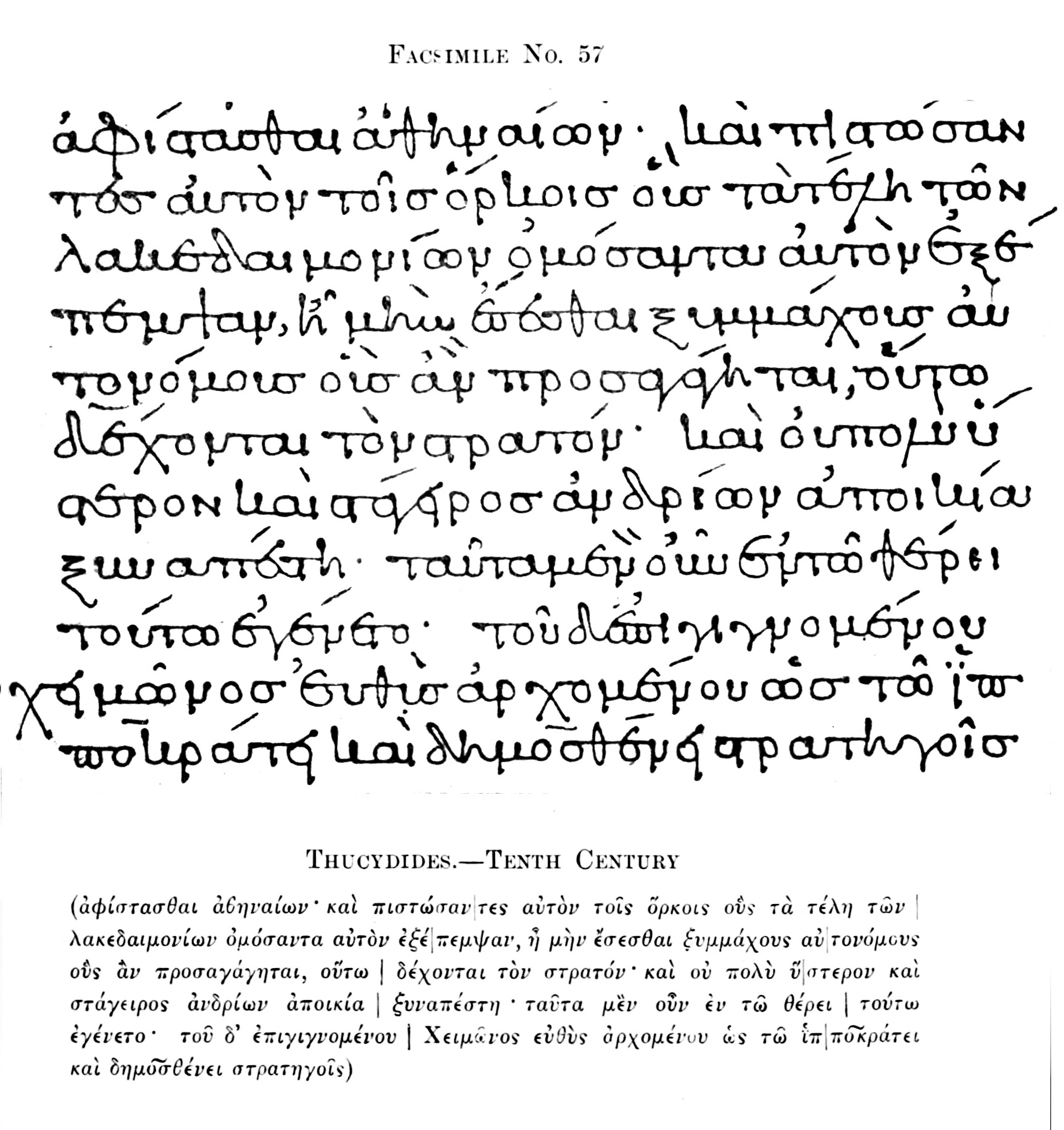
10th-century minuscule manuscript of Thucydides's History of the Peloponnesian War

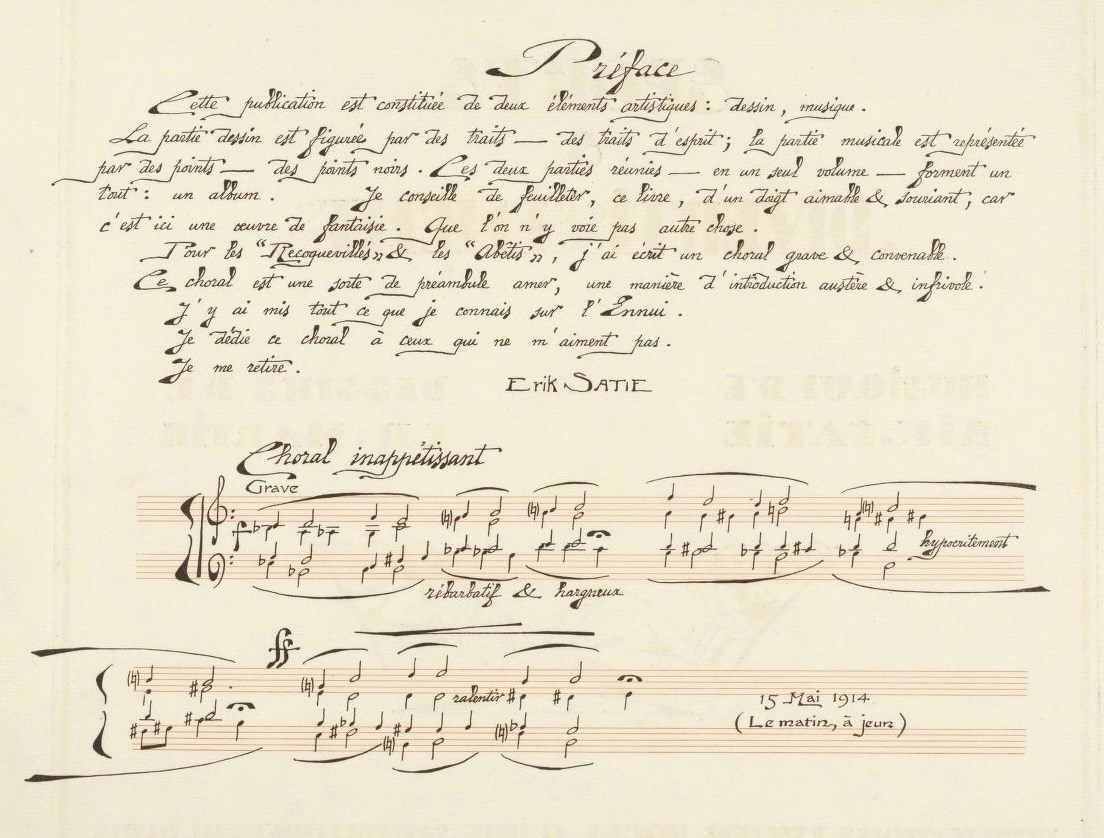
First page of Satie's Sports et divertissements (published as a facsimile in 1923)

The word "manuscript" derives from the Latin: manūscriptum (from manus, hand and scriptum from scribere, to write), and is first recorded in English in 1597. An earlier term in English that shares the meaning of a handwritten document is "hand-writ" (or "handwrit"), which is first attested around 1175 and is now rarely used. The study of the writing (the "hand") in surviving manuscripts is termed palaeography (or paleography). The library catalog abbreviations are MS for manuscript and MSS for manuscripts, while the forms MS., ms or ms. for singular, and MSS., mss or mss. for plural (with or without the full stop, all uppercase or all lowercase) are also accepted. The second s is not simply the plural; by an old convention, a doubling of the last letter of the abbreviation expresses the plural, just as pp. means "pages".

A manuscript may be a codex (i.e. bound as a book), a scroll, or bound differently or consist of loose pages. Illuminated manuscripts are enriched with pictures, border decorations, elaborately embossed initial letters or full-page illustrations.

=== Format ===
- Format: Scroll; Codex

=== Parts ===
- Leaf (books) (or fragments thereof)
- Cover
- Flyleaf (blank sheet)
- Colophon (publication information)
- Incipit (the first few words of the text)
- Decoration; illustrations
- Dimensions (Book size)
- Shelfmark or Signature in holding library (as opposed to printed Catalog number). Paper size number often precedes signature number with a circulus (degree symbol) following, but many libraries prefer spelling out the word (sometimes only in abbreviation) of the paper size (e.g. Fol[ia]., Qu[arto], Oct[avo, etc.). Some libraries use an equal sign instead of the circulus and may change the side on which the paper size number appears (8=3456 vs 3456=8) for indexing purposes.
- works/compositions included in same ms
- codicological elements:
  - deletions method: erasure? overstrike? dots above letters?
  - headers/footers
  - page format/layout: columns? text and surrounding commentary/additions/glosses?
  - interpolations (passage not written by the original author)
  - owners' or reader's marginal notations/corrections
  - owner signatures
  - dedication/inscription
  - censor signatures
- collation (quires) (binding order)
- foliation
- page numeration
- binding
- manuscripts bound together in a single volume:
  - convolute: volume containing different manuscripts
  - fascicle: individual manuscript, part of a set (called a convolute).

=== Materials ===
- paper
- parchment
- papyrus
- ink
- writing implement
- pencil
- pastedown

=== Paleographic elements ===
- script (one or more)
- dating
- line fillers
- rubrication (red ink text)
- ruled lines
- catchwords
- historical elements of the ms: blood, wine etc. stains
- condition:
  - smokiness
  - evidence of fire
  - mold
  - wormed

=== Reproduction ===
The mechanical reproduction of a manuscript is called facsimile. Digital reproductions can be called (high-resolution) scans or digital images.

== History ==
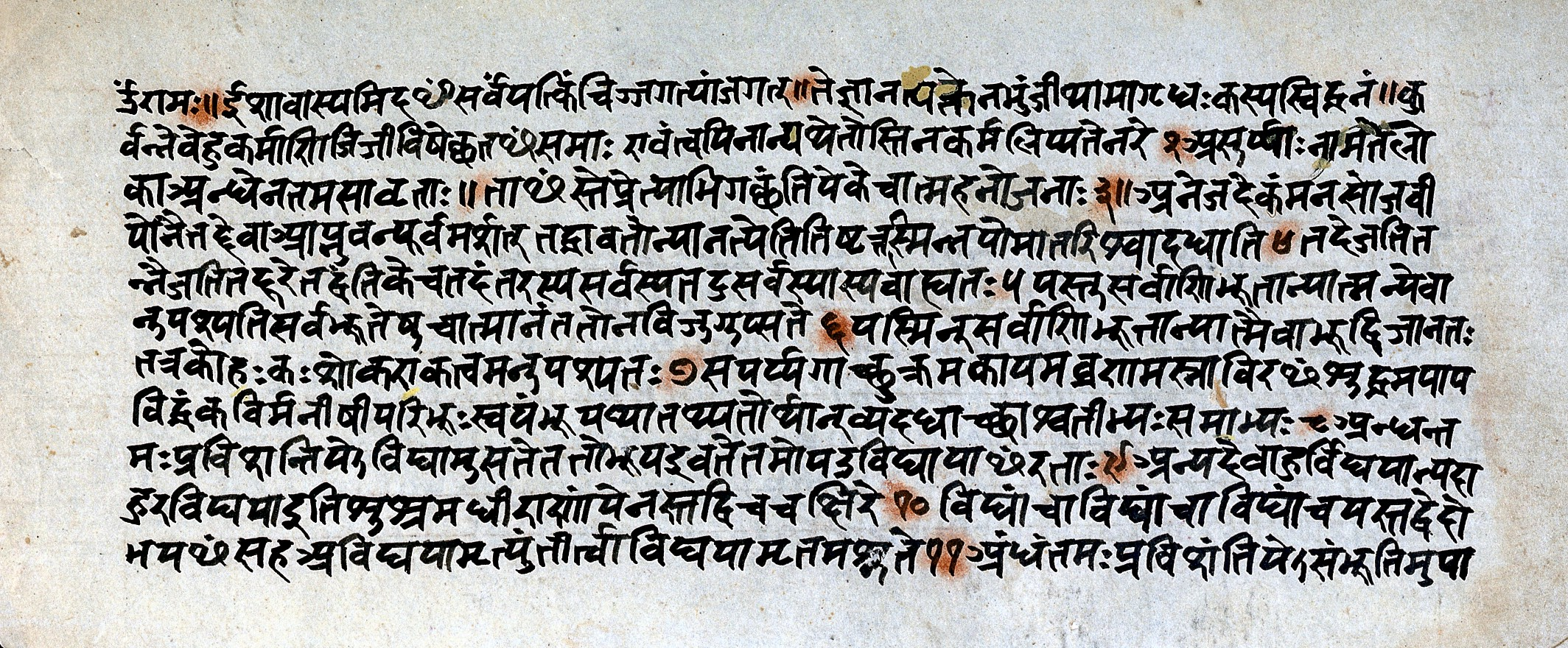
The Isha Upanishad manuscript

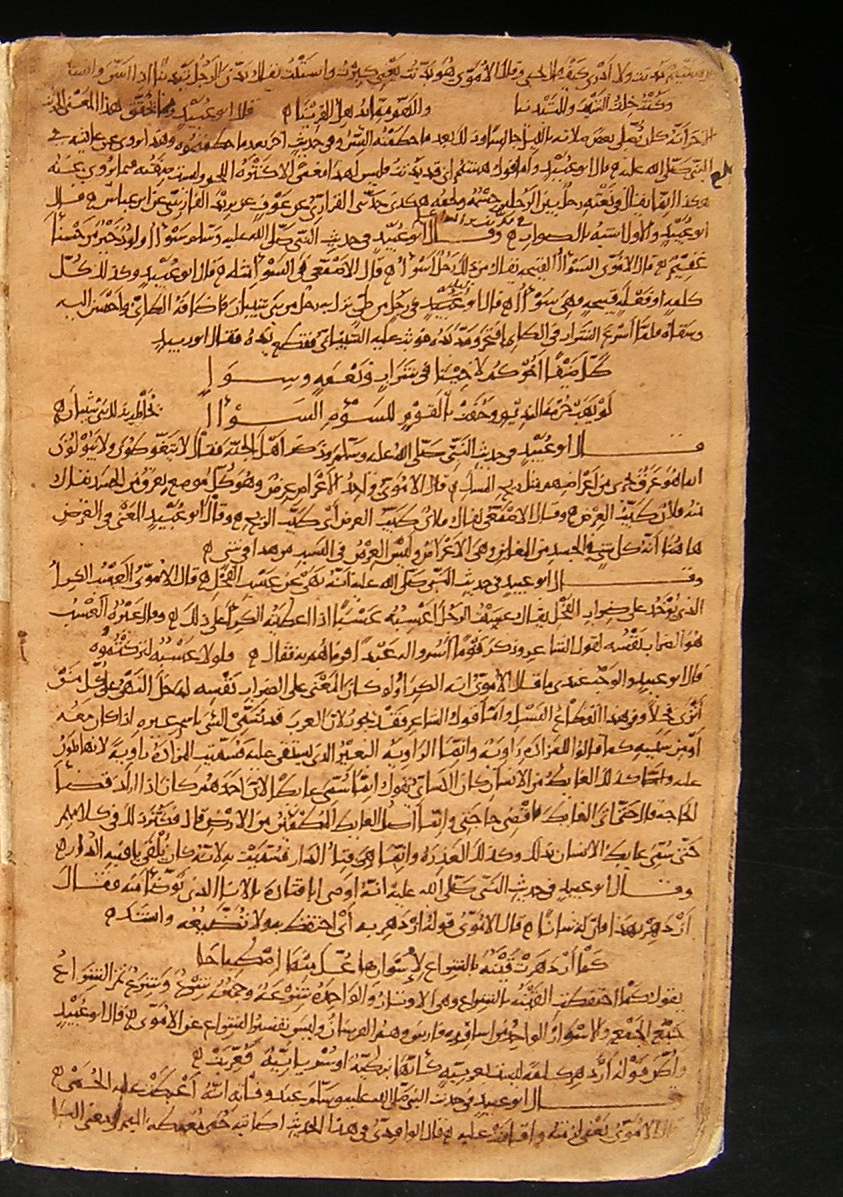
Gharib al-Hadith, by Abu 'Ubaid al-Qasim ibn Sallam al-Harawi (d. 837 AD). The oldest known dated Arabic manuscript on paper in Leiden University Library, dated 319 AH (931 AD)

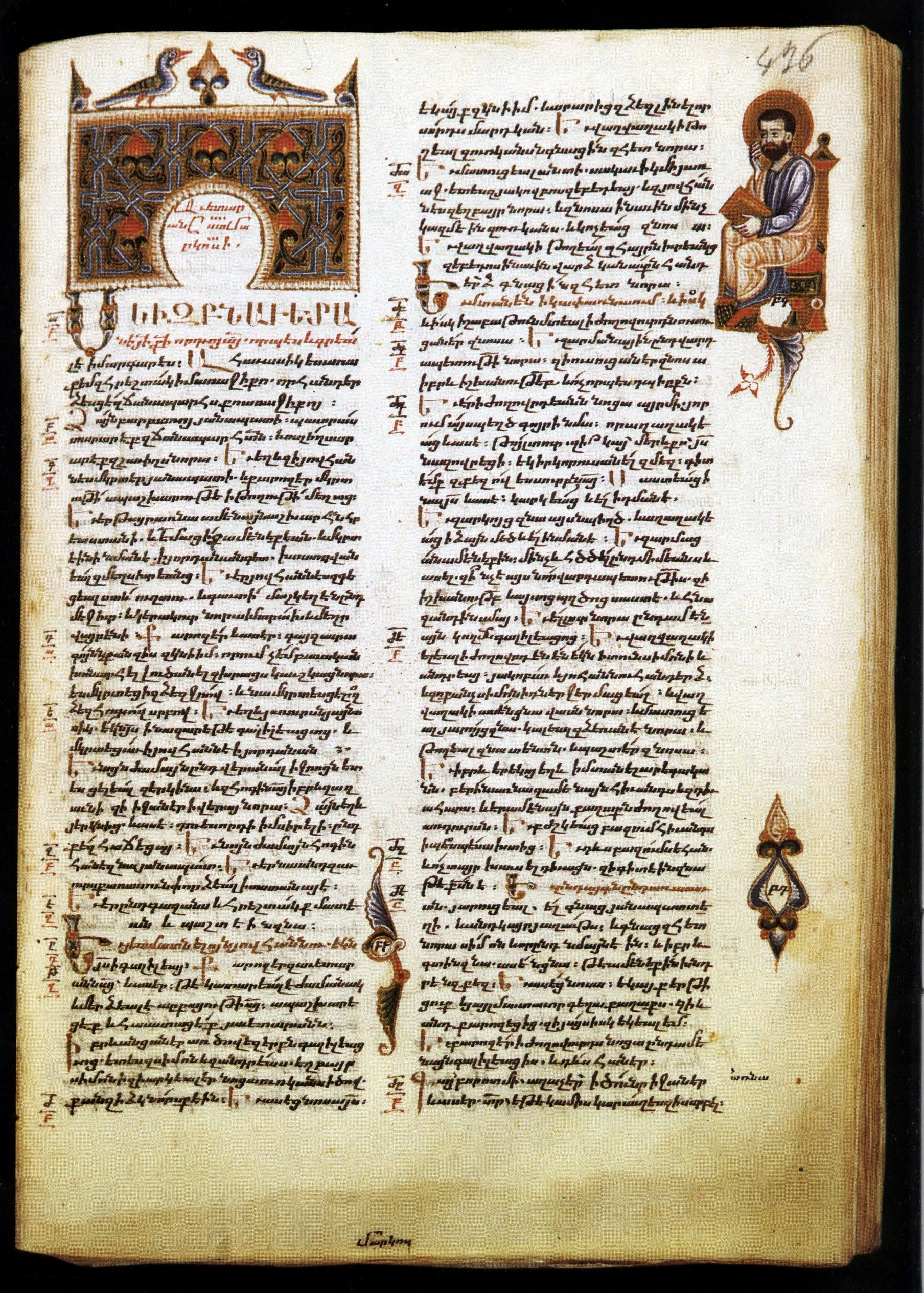
A 14th-century Armenian manuscript, with painting by Sargis Pitsak. The first page of the Gospel of Mark. Cod. 2627, fol. 436 r. (Matenadaran)

Before the invention of printing, in China by woodblock and in Europe by movable type in a printing press, all written documents were produced and reproduced by hand. In Europe, manuscripts were produced in form of scrolls (volumen in Latin) or books (codex, plural codices). Manuscripts were produced on vellum and other parchment, on papyrus, and on paper.

In Indian subcontinent and Southeast Asia, palm leaf manuscripts, with a distinctive long rectangular shape, were used dating back to the 5th century BCE or earlier, and in some cases continued to be used until the 19th century. In China, bamboo and wooden slips were used prior to the introduction of paper. In Russia, birch bark documents as old as from the 11th century have survived.

Paper spread from China via the Islamic world to Europe by the 14th century, and by the late 15th century had largely replaced parchment. When Greek or Latin works were published, copies were sometimes made simultaneously by scribes in a scriptorium, each making a single copy from an original that was declaimed aloud.

The oldest written manuscripts have been preserved by the dry environments of the Middle East, whether placed within sarcophagi in Egyptian tombs, or reused as mummy-wrappings, discarded in the middens of Oxyrhynchus or secreted for safe-keeping in jars and buried (Nag Hammadi library) or stored in dry caves (Dead Sea Scrolls). Volcanic ash preserved some of the Roman library of the Villa of the Papyri in Herculaneum. Manuscripts in Tocharian languages, written on palm leaves, survived in desert burials in the Tarim Basin of Central Asia.

Papyrus has a life of at most a century or two in relatively humid Italian or Greek conditions; only those works copied onto parchment, usually after the general conversion to Christianity, have survived, and by no means all of those.

Originally, all books were in manuscript form. In China, and later other parts of East Asia, woodblock printing was used for books from about the 7th century. The earliest dated example is the Diamond Sutra of 868. In the Islamic world and the West, all books were in manuscript until the introduction of movable type printing in about 1450. Manuscript copying of books continued for a least a century, as printing remained expensive. Private or government documents remained hand-written until the invention of the typewriter in the late 19th century. Because of the likelihood of errors being introduced each time a manuscript was copied, the filiation of different versions of the same text is a fundamental part of the study and criticism of all texts that have been transmitted in manuscript.

In Southeast Asia, in the first millennium, documents of sufficiently great importance were inscribed on soft metallic sheets such as copperplate, softened by refiner's fire and inscribed with a metal stylus. In the Philippines, for example, as early as 900 AD, specimen documents were not inscribed by stylus, but were punched much like the style of today's dot-matrix printers. This type of document was rare compared to the usual leaves and bamboo staves that were inscribed. However, neither the leaves nor paper were as durable as the metal document in the hot, humid climate. In Burma, the kammavaca, Buddhist manuscripts, were inscribed on brass, copper or ivory sheets, and even on discarded monk robes folded and lacquered. In Italy some important Etruscan texts were similarly inscribed on thin gold plates: similar sheets have been discovered in Bulgaria. Technically, these are all inscriptions rather than manuscripts.

In the Western world, from the classical period through the early centuries of the Christian era, manuscripts were written without spaces between the words (scriptio continua), which makes them especially hard for the untrained to read. Extant copies of these early manuscripts written in Greek or Latin and usually dating from the 4th century to the 8th century, are classified according to their use of either all upper case or all lower case letters. Hebrew manuscripts, such as the Dead Sea scrolls make no such differentiation. Manuscripts using all upper case letters are called majuscule, those using all lower case are called minuscule. Usually, the majuscule scripts such as uncial are written with much more care. The scribe lifted his pen between each stroke, producing an unmistakable effect of regularity and formality. On the other hand, while minuscule scripts can be written with pen-lift, they may also be cursive, that is, use little or no pen-lift.

== Islamic world ==
Islamic manuscripts were produced in different ways depending on their use and time period. Parchment (vellum) was a common way to produce manuscripts. Manuscripts eventually transitioned to using paper in later centuries with the diffusion of paper making in the Islamic empire. When Muslims encountered paper in Central Asia, its use and production spread to Iran, Iraq, Syria, Egypt, and North Africa during the 8th century.

== Africa ==
4,203 of Timbuktu's manuscripts were burned or stolen during the armed conflict in Mali between 2012 and 2013. 90% of these manuscripts were saved by the population organized around the NGO "Sauvegarde et valorisation des manuscrits pour la défense de la culture islamique" (SAVAMA-DCI). Some 350,000 manuscripts were transported to safety, and 300,000 of them were still in Bamako in 2022. An international consultation on the safeguarding, accessibility and promotion of ancient manuscripts in the Sahel was held at the UNESCO office in Bamako in 2020.

== Western world ==
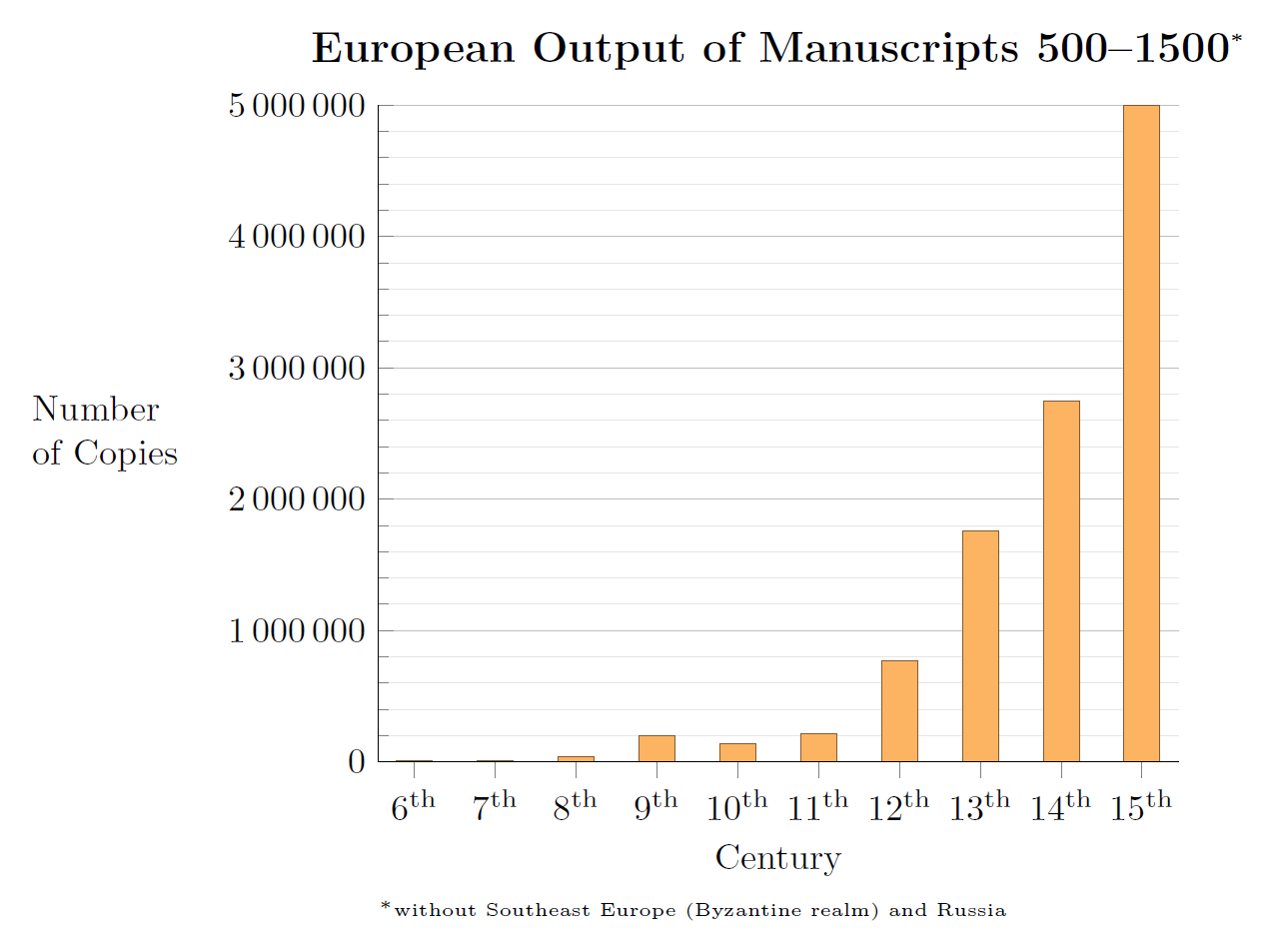
After plummeting in the Early Middle Ages, the high and late medieval period witnessed a sharp increase of manuscript production.

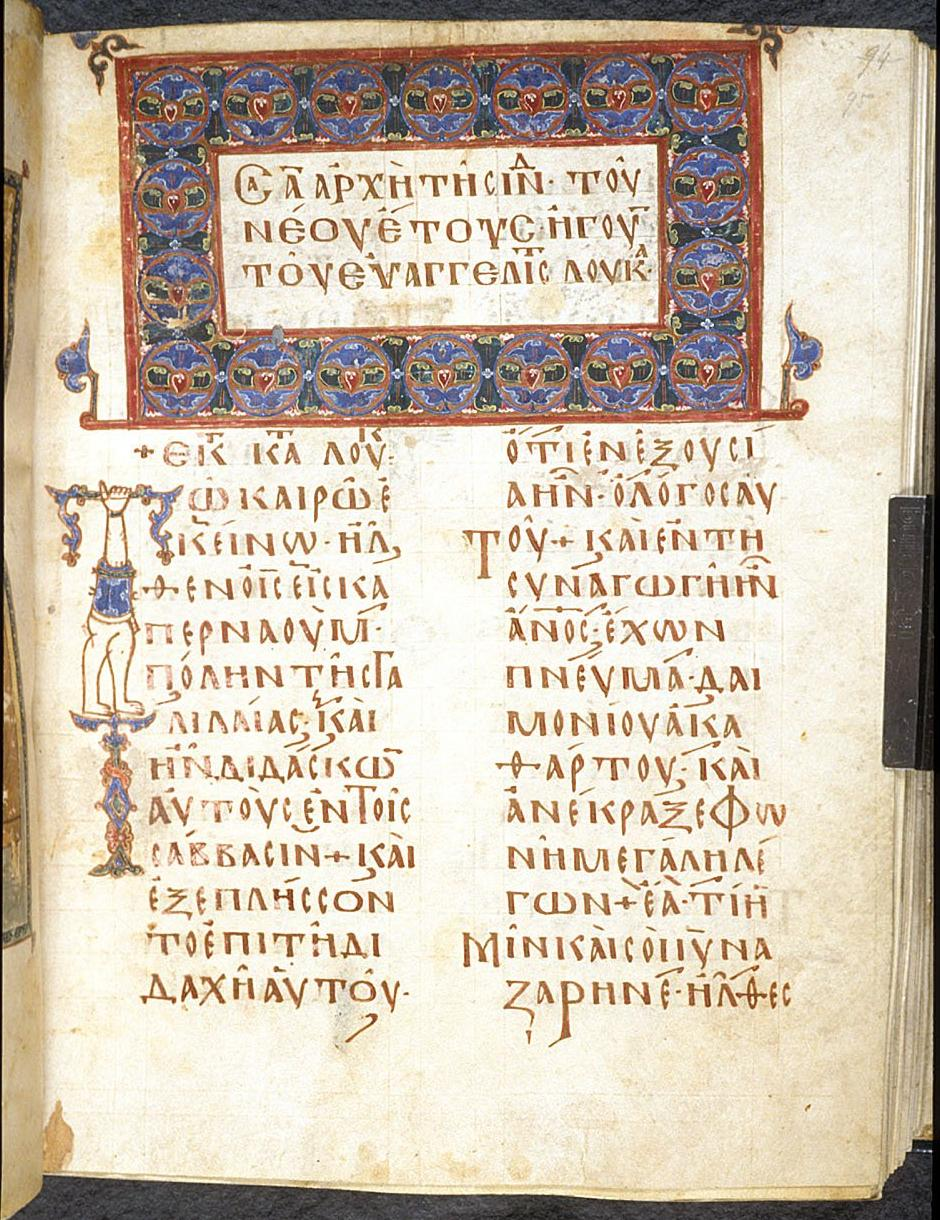
Lectionary 183

Most surviving pre-modern manuscripts use the codex format (as in a modern book), which had replaced the scroll by Late Antiquity. Parchment or vellum, made of animal skins, replaced papyrus. Calf, sheep, and goat were most commonly used. Parchment made from calf or sheep was the most common in Northern Europe, while civilizations in Southern Europe preferred goatskin.

Vellum comes from the Latin word vitulinum which means "of calf"/ "made from calf". For modern parchment makers and calligraphers, and apparently often in the past, the terms parchment and vellum are used based on the different degrees of quality, preparation and thickness, and not according to which animal the skin came from, and because of this, the more neutral term "membrane" is often used by modern academics, especially where the animal has not been established by testing.

=== Scripts ===
Merovingian script, or "Luxeuil minuscule", is named after an abbey in Western France, the Luxeuil Abbey, founded by the Irish missionary St Columba c. 590. Caroline minuscule is a calligraphic script developed as a writing standard in Europe so that the Latin alphabet could be easily recognized by the literate class from different regions. It was used in the Holy Roman Empire between approximately 800 and 1200. Codices, classical and Christian texts, and educational material were written in Carolingian minuscule throughout the Carolingian Renaissance. The script developed into blackletter and became obsolete, though its revival in the Italian renaissance forms the basis of more recent scripts. In Introduction to Manuscript Studies, Clemens and Graham associate the beginning of this text coming from the Abby of Saint-Martin at Tours.

Caroline Minuscule arrived in England in the second half of the 10th century. Its adoption there, replacing Insular script, was encouraged by the importation of continental European manuscripts by Saints Dunstan, Aethelwold, and Oswald. This script spread quite rapidly, being employed in many English centres for copying Latin texts. English scribes adapted the Carolingian script, giving it proportion and legibility. This new revision of the Caroline minuscule was called English Protogothic Bookhand. Another script that is derived from the Caroline Minuscule was the German Protogothic Bookhand. It originated in southern Germany during the second half of the 12th century. All the individual letters are Caroline; but just as with English Protogothic Bookhand it evolved. This can be seen most notably in the arm of the letter h. It has a hairline that tapers out by curving to the left. When first read the German Protogothic h looks like the German Protogothic b. Many more scripts sprang out of the German Protogothic Bookhand. After those came Bastard Anglicana, which is best described as:

The coexistence in the Gothic period of formal hands employed for the copying of books and cursive scripts used for documentary purposes eventually resulted in cross-fertilization between these two fundamentally different writing styles. Notably, scribes began to upgrade some of the cursive scripts. A script that has been thus formalized is known as a bastard script (whereas a bookhand that has had cursive elements fused onto it is known as a hybrid script). The advantage of such a script was that it could be written more quickly than a pure bookhand; it thus recommended itself to scribes in a period when demand for books was increasing and authors were tending to write longer texts. In England during the fourteenth and fifteenth centuries, many books were written in the script known as Bastard Anglicana.

=== Genres ===
From ancient texts to medieval maps, anything written down for study would have been done with manuscripts. Some of the most common genres were bibles, religious commentaries, philosophy, law and government texts.

==== Biblical ====
"The Bible was the most studied book of the Middle Ages". The Bible was the center of medieval religious life. Along with the Bible came scores of commentaries. Commentaries were written in volumes, with some focusing on just single pages of scripture. Across Europe, there were universities that prided themselves on their biblical knowledge. Along with universities, certain cities also had their own celebrities of biblical knowledge during the medieval period.

==== Book of hours ====
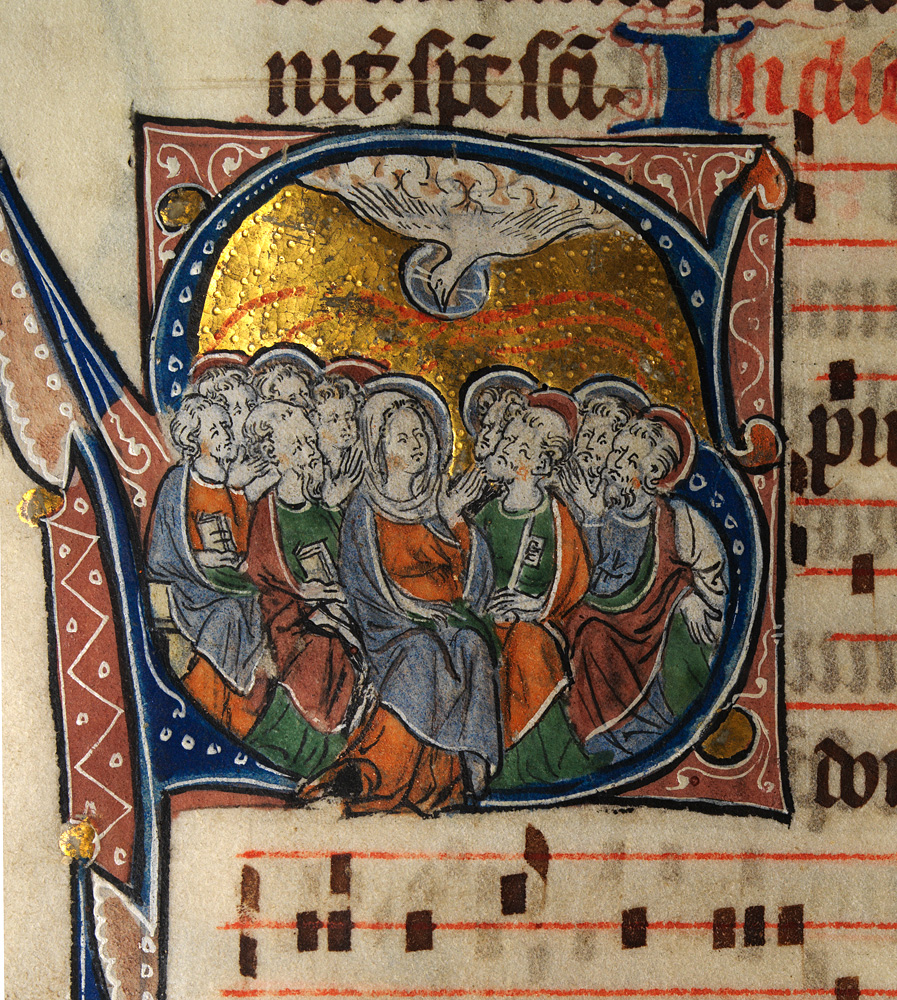
Illuminated letter S (for Spiritus domini) from the Sherbrooke Missal: Aberystwyth, National Library of Wales, MS 15536E, fol. 169v, parchment, c. 1310–1320, depicting the Holy Spirit descending on the apostles at Pentecost.

A book of hours is a type of devotional text which was widely popular during the Middle Ages. They are the most common type of surviving medieval illuminated manuscripts. Each book of hours contain a similar collection of texts, prayers, and psalms but decoration can vary between each and each example. Many have minimal illumination, often restricted to ornamented initials, but books of hours made for wealthier patrons can be extremely extravagant with full-page miniatures. These books were used for owners to recite prayers privately eight different times, or hours, of the day.

==== Liturgical books and calendars ====
Along with Bibles, large numbers of manuscripts made in the Middle Ages were received in Church. Due to the complex church system of rituals and worship these books were the most elegantly written and finely decorated of all medieval manuscripts. Liturgical books usually came in two varieties. Those used during mass and those for divine office.

Most liturgical books came with a calendar in the front. This served as a quick reference point for important dates in Jesus' life and to tell church officials which saints were to be honored and on what day.

== Modern variations ==
In the context of library science, a manuscript is defined as any hand-written item in the collections of a library or an archive. For example, a library's collection of hand-written letters or diaries is considered a manuscript collection. Such manuscript collections are described in finding aids, similar to an index or table of contents to the collection, in accordance with national and international content standards such as DACS and ISAD(G).

In other contexts, however, the use of the term "manuscript" no longer necessarily means something that is hand-written. By analogy a typescript has been produced on a typewriter.

=== Publishing ===
In book, magazine, and music publishing, a manuscript is an autograph or copy of a work, written by an author, composer or copyist. Such manuscripts generally follow standardized typographic and formatting rules, in which case they can be called fair copy (whether original or copy). The staff paper commonly used for handwritten music is, for this reason, often called "manuscript paper".

=== Film and theatre ===
In film and theatre, a manuscript, or script for short, is an author's or dramatist's text, used by a theatre company or film crew during the production of the work's performance or filming. More specifically, a motion picture manuscript is called a screenplay; a television manuscript, a teleplay; a manuscript for the theatre, a stage play; and a manuscript for audio-only performance is often called a radio play, even when the recorded performance is disseminated via non-radio means.

== Preservation ==
About 300,000 Latin, 55,000 Greek, 30,000 Armenian and 12,000 Georgian medieval manuscripts have survived. National Geographic estimates that 700,000 African manuscripts have survived at the University of Timbuktu in Mali.

== Repositories ==
Major U.S. repositories of medieval manuscripts include:

- The Morgan Library & Museum = 1,300 (including papyri)
- Beinecke Rare Book and Manuscript Library, Yale = 1,100
- Walters Art Museum = 1,000
- Houghton Library, Harvard = 850
- Van Pelt Library, Penn = 650
- Huntington Library = 400
- Robbins Collection = 300
- Newberry Library = 260
- Cornell University Library = 150

Many European libraries have far larger collections.

- Arnamagnæan Institute
- Árni Magnússon Institute for Icelandic Studies
- British Library § Collections of manuscripts
- Kungliga biblioteket

Because they are books, pre-modern manuscripts are best described using bibliographic rather than archival standards. The standard endorsed by the American Library Association is known as AMREMM. A growing digital catalog of pre-modern manuscripts is Digital Scriptorium, hosted by the University of California at Berkeley.

== See also ==
=== Examples ===
- Gandhāran Buddhist texts – Ancient Gandhāran Buddhist manuscript
- Dead Sea Scrolls – Ancient Jewish biblical manuscripts
- Spitzer Manuscript – Oldest known or surviving philosophical manuscript in Sanskrit
- Archimedes Palimpsest – Greek parchment codex manuscript
- Codex Zouche-Nuttall – Pre-Columbian document of Mixtec pictography
- Codex Arundel – Book by Leonardo da Vinci
- Sinkang Manuscripts – Series of Chinese leases, mortgages, and other commerce contracts
- Heiligenstadt Testament – 1802 letter by Ludwig van Beethoven
- Dunhuang manuscripts – Ancient Tibetan and Chinese documents

=== Lists ===
- List of illuminated manuscripts – Prayer books, psalters and illustrated bibles
- List of Irish manuscripts
- List of Hiberno-Saxon illuminated manuscripts

=== General ===
- Calligraphy – Writing as a visual art
- Conservation and restoration of illuminated manuscripts – Care and treatment of decorated texts
- Manuscript culture – Culture depending on handwritten manuscripts
- Miniature (illuminated manuscript) – Picture in an ancient or medieval illuminated manuscript
- Music manuscript – Handwritten sources of music
- Palm-leaf manuscript – Manuscripts made out of dried palm leaves
