= Records in Contexts =

Records in Contexts, or RiC, is a standard for describing records, created and maintained by the Expert Group on Archival Description (EGAD) of the International Council on Archives (ICA). Version 1.0 of the first three parts of the standard — a high-level conceptual model (RiC-CM), an ontology (RiC-O), and a description of the foundations of the standard (RiC-FAD) — were released in late 2023, whilst version 0.1 of the fourth part, containing application guidelines (RiC-AG), was released in October 2025. It is an official recommendation of ICA that RiC replace the earlier standard ISAD(G), which is in widespread use, along with the latter's companion standards ISAAR(CPF), ISDF, and ISDIAH.

== Overview ==
As well as bringing together and building upon ISAD(G), ISAAR(CPF), ISDF, and ISDIAH, RiC differs from them and other earlier standards in describing electronic records on an equal footing to analogue ones. It is intended for both the archival and record management communities, with EGAD from its inception having included representatives from both. It allows for expressing the complex relationships records have with each other, as well as with their creators, holders, subjects, readers, and more, enabling a rich descriptive context.

Key innovations (as far as standards for archival description go; they all have a foundation in archival theory, and have echoes in other standards in the cultural heritage domain and elsewhere) in RiC include:

1. It is not hierarchical. The dominant practice in archival description, for the best part of a century at least, was the organisation of records into fonds, series within a fonds, files within a series, items within a file, and other sub-categories, with additional metadata — who created the records, when they were created, for what purpose/under what activity, and so on — attached to these levels. RiC instead is entirely decentralised, placing records into a network of context. It can still express the traditional hierarchies, but such description is on equal par with any other aspect of a record's context.
2. It distinguishes between a record and an instantiation of it. A record is regarded as something intellectual which must have or had at least one physical incarnation (instantiation), but may have or have had many. A typical example is that a record may originally have existed as a paper document, but may also have been digitized, and the original may or may not have been destroyed.
3. It emphasises records. Whist RiC's notion of Record Set does fully allow for description of aggregations of records, it is 'bottom up' rather than the 'top down' of the traditional hierarchical approach.
4. Its flexibility and extensibility. The Activity, Agent, and Rule entities of RiC, and the relations that intertwine them, allow for both comprehensive and nuanced description of all kinds of aspects of archival and record management practice.

== History ==
The EGAD has been working on the standard since 2013. An early version of RiC-CM and RiC-O were released for comment during 2016. Considerable feedback was received, including from some critical — if not neutral — quarters, which was worked through by EGAD and incorporated into the significantly updated, and much more mature, version 0.2 of 2021, which also included RiC-FAD.

From this time — though there was earlier engagement too — a number of institutions, companies, researchers and others began in earnest exploring taking RiC into use. Small tweaks, and the taking into account of further feedback, were made over the next few years, culminating in the release of Version 1.0 in late 2023. Whilst adoption of RiC, and preparation for this, is still at an early stage as of 2025, it has accelerated rapidly since the release of Version 1.0, and continues to do so. The RiC user group is the primary forum for online discussion of RiC, with a worldwide community.

== See also ==
- ISAD(G)
- Describing Archives: A Content Standard
- Encoded Archival Description
- Manual of Archival Description
- International Standard Archival Authority Record
- Archival processing
- Finding aid
