= Describing Archives: A Content Standard =

Standard for describing materials in archives

Describing Archives: A Content Standard (DACS) is a standard used for describing materials in archives. First adopted by the Society of American Archivists (SAA) in March 2004, DACS was updated with a Second Edition in 2013. DACS is broken down into a set of rules used in crafting archival descriptions, and guidelines for creating authority records in archives.

== Overview ==
When fully adopted in 2005, DACS replaced Archives, Personal Papers, and Manuscripts, the previous SAA archival cataloging standard. It is the United States implementation of ISAD(G).

DACS consists of two parts: Part I, Describing Archival Materials, and Part II, Archival Authority Records. DACS is concerned with providing a framework for creating useful tools for researchers in archives through the description of records, historical agents, historical activities, and the relationships between them.

The elements and frameworks of DACS are closely related to both the library-focused cataloging rules of Resource Description and Access (RDA) and the international description standards formed by ISAD(G). The main goal of archival description is to assist users in finding the documents they are looking for through the creation of access tools such as catalogs or finding aids, and DACS exists to provide a standard for creating those tools. DACS has now been widely adopted by the archival community throughout the United States. It is currently maintained by the SAA's Technical Subcommittee on Describing Archives: A Content Standard and the most up-to-date version is hosted on their GitHub.

== Principles of DACS ==
=== Current DACS principles, 2019-present ===
==== Revision history ====
TS-DACS began re-evaluating Describing Archives: A Content Standard for alignment with current archival theory and practice in 2016. Following an initial review over the summer of that year, TS-DACS organized an in-person principles revision meeting that took place concurrently with the SAA annual meeting in Atlanta. Later in 2016, TS-DACS requested funds from SAA to facilitate another meeting of TS-DACS members and other invited experts to take place outside of the annual meeting. This request was eventually granted and the second principles revision meeting took place in March of 2017. TS-DACS put out a call for comment on the revised principles in June of 2017. Feedback from this open comment period was analyzed and incorporated throughout 2018. In August of 2018, a final call for comment was published. The final revised principles were submitted to SAA's council and approved in May 2019.

==== Current principles ====
1. Archival description expresses professional ethics and values.
2. Users are the fundamental reason for archival description.
3. Because archival description privileges intellectual content in context, descriptive rules apply equally to all records, regardless of format or carrier type.
4. Records, agents, activities, and the relationships between them are the four fundamental concepts that constitute archival description.
5. Archival description must be clear about what archivists know, what they don’t know, and how they know it.
6. Archivists must document and make discoverable the actions they take on records.
7. Archival description is accessible.
8. Archival description should be easy to use, re-use, and share.
9. Each collection within a repository must have an archival description.
10. Archivists must have a user-driven reason to enhance existing archival description.
11. Archival description is a continuous intellectual endeavor.

=== DACS founding principles, 2004-2019 ===
At its first publication, DACS was guided by a set of 8 principles, which serve to elucidate why archival description is separate from library description and to give guidance in applying DACS. These have since been superseded. They were as follows:

1. "Records in archives possess unique characteristics.
2. "The principle of respect des fonds is the basis of archival arrangement and description.
3. "Arrangement involves the identification of groupings within the material.
4. "Description reflects arrangement.
5. "The rules of description apply to all archival materials, regardless of form or medium.
6. "The principles of archival description apply equally to records created by corporate bodies, individuals, or families.
7. "Archival descriptions may be presented at varying levels of detail to produce a variety of outputs.
8. "The creators of archival materials, as well as the materials themselves, must be described."

== Part I Describing Archival Materials ==
The first part of DACS deals with rules for crafting archival description. It can be broken down into levels of description, with each level adding a layer of complexity. DACS discretely describes these levels as Single Level Required, Single Level Optimum, Single Level Added Value, Multilevel Required, Multilevel Optimum, and Multilevel Added Value. Every level requires that the DACS metadata elements from the previous levels are complete, and that the relationship between the current level and previous levels are clearly presented. The rest of Part I defines the metadata elements required for each level of description.

== Part II Archival Authority Records ==
The second part of DACS is concerned with creating records that establish the context in which an archival material was created, appraised, and included in an archive. There are three steps in creating these authority records: identifying the people or organizations involved in creating the record, assembling biographical data relating to those creators, and applying a standard such as Resource Description and Access to the names so that the names can be easily referenced between institutions. These authority records can then either be incorporated into metadata of an archival records or separate authority records can be created, which are then linked with the archival materials.

== Relation to Other Standards ==
While the first edition expanded on the basic rules for describing archival material that are found in chapter 4 of the deprecated library cataloging standard, Anglo-American Cataloguing Rules (AACR2), the second edition of DACS more closely relates to AACR2's successor, Resource Description and Access (RDA). DACS serves as the US implementation of international archival descriptive standards such as ISAD(G) and the International Standard Archival Authority Record. It also provides crosswalks from DACS to MARC, Encoded Archival Description (EAD), RDA, and Encoded Archival Context (EAC-CPF). DACS specifies only the type of content, not the structural or encoding requirements or the actual verbiage to be used; it is therefore suitable for use in conjunction with structural and encoding standards, such as MARC and EAD, and with controlled vocabularies such as Medical Subject Headings, Library of Congress Subject Headings, Art & Architecture Thesaurus, and so on.

== See also ==
- ISAD(G)
- Records in Contexts
- Encoded Archival Description
- Manual of Archival Description
- International Standard Archival Authority Record
- Archival processing
- Finding aid
