= Original order =

Original order is a concept in archival theory that a group of records should be maintained in the same order as they were placed by the record's creator. Along with provenance, original order is a core tenet of the archival concept of respect des fonds. A primary goal of keeping records in their original order is to preserve additional contextual information about the records' creator and the environment of their creation. Original order also encourages the archivist to remain neutral as opposed to applying any interpretation to the records.

== Principle ==
The Society of American Archivists Glossary of Archival and Records Terminology calls original order a "fundamental principle of archives" and posits two primary purposes: preserving "relationships and evidential significance" of records and facilitating use of the records by maintaining "the record creator's mechanisms to access". The SAA definition qualifies that original order is not necessarily the order of the records upon their delivery to an archive; if something is received by the archive clearly out of sequence, it is expected that the archive will return an item to its original location. If the records are received without any discernible organization system, then original order may need to be created by the archivist.

The order in which records were created may provide some important information about the intention of the records' creator. Original order helps to keep the context of records intact, and some records depend on their original context to tell their whole story. Researchers may use this context to better understand the records' relationship to each other, their creator, or the manner in which they were maintained, used, or transmitted prior to being received by the archives.

Another benefit of maintaining original order is that it reduces the amount of time that archivists must spend processing and arranging new records as they are received into a collection. Instead of creating a new organizational system, developing new metadata, or writing new descriptions, archivists can use systems and descriptions already developed by the creator, as outlined in the seminal article "More Product, Less Process".

Original order is closely related to, but not the same as, provenance, which refers to the origin of a record's creation or ownership. In addition to being kept in their original order, best practice dictates that records should be grouped together according to their provenance; records created by different individuals or organizations should not be mixed together, even if they discuss the same subject matter.

== History ==
Max Lehmann is often credited as the first archivist to write about the principle of original order, when he developed guidelines for the Prussian Privy State Archives in 1881. Original order, or the Registraturprinzip, represented the easiest way for the Prussian archivists to maintain the complicated registry systems of the State Archives. Prior to this, many archives had organized their records according to format, content, or chronology. Many developed chronological registers, essentially a sequential list of records that grew as they were added to the archive. This often made it difficult for archivists to process and describe records, particularly in large collections or when they were faced with arranging undated documents.

The first noteworthy articulation of the practice of original order was presented in the Manual for the Arrangement and Description of Archives (also known as The Dutch Manual) in 1898, where, in the chapter on the arrangement of archival documents, point #16 states: "The system of arrangement must be based on the original organization of the archival collection, which in the main corresponds to the organization of the administrative body that produced it."

These principles were not meant to apply to personal papers, as the Dutch Manual did not consider an individual's collection of personal papers to constitute an archive. In the first English-language manual for archive administration, published in 1937, Sir Hillary Jenkinson argued that only "documents which formed part of an official transaction and were preserved for official reference' qualified as archives." Many, though not all, contemporary archivists, though, have changed their thinking and view personal papers as archives deserving of the same treatment as government or organizational records.

== Critiques ==
Many archivists have provided critiques to the principle of original order. T. R. Schellenberg argued that the principle emerged from countries with a registry system of archival custodianship, in which registrars played an important role as intermediary between the agency or institution creating records and the archive that acquired and preserved them. The imposition of order by these registrars ensured records were logically and consistently organized prior to their delivery to the archive. By the 1960s, this registrar function no longer existed and records were instead often delivered to an archive absent any coherent or comprehensible system of organization. Schellenberg argued that, "Normally [the archivist] should try to understand the system of arrangement that was imposed on the records originally rather than to impose one of his preference. But he should have no compunction about rearranging series in relation to each other or single record items within them if by so doing he can make the records more intelligible and more serviceable." Similarly, Frank Boles noted that adhering to original order means prioritizing the creators' arrangement of records over a system that best suits future users and researchers, and this may at times limit the ability of researchers to access records.

Other critics have pointed out that even the restoration of a presumed original order can risk erasing evidence of the management of a group of records after their original creation and organization. The malleable nature of large organizations, in which groups of records can pass through multiple custodians prior to their transfer to an archive, can make identifying an original order difficult. Tom Nesmith further argued that original order is not necessarily permanent over the life of the record; as records move from one custodian to another, prior to arriving in an archive, it is likely that the order will be rearranged such that the archive is no longer receiving the records in the order in which they were created. Continued use of an archival collection and ongoing processing or rearrangement may also impact ideas of what constitutes "original" order and what contextual information is prioritized for preservation.

Some archivists believe that original order may be less applicable to personal papers because it is more likely that the creator of these records did not create or store the records in a meaningful way. Jennifer Meehan, for example, argues that "Archivists must conceive of original order differently to adequately understand and contextualize personal records: rather than thinking of it as an ends to be achieved, it might better serve archival purposes by thinking of it as a means for carrying out arrangement and description." Others argue that keeping personal records in their original order provides important contextual information about the personality or mental state of the creator.

== In digital archives ==
In the modern age, the abundance of digitized records has created some new challenges to understanding and maintaining original order.

Inscription, the way that digital files are written to a drive or disk, typically stores bits of data in non-sequential order, based on where space is available. The bits must be gathered together and aggregated into a file that has meaning to the user. Additionally, each time an electronic file is accessed, it is changed. This new information, such as a "last saved" date or the temporary files created by a software's autosave function, is also stored in new places on the disk. Digital records are more likely to have multiple versions over the course of their lifetime than physical records—more, even, than the creator may be aware of—which can make identifying original order difficult.

Based upon case studies of digitized and born-digital records, Jane Zhang described several key findings about the notion of original order in digital archives. These findings include the fact that electronic records may have multiple variations of original order because they do not have a fixed system of organization; they can be reorganized based on any number of metadata at the click of a button. Additionally, metadata applied to electronic records by the creator makes automatic processing much easier and may be applied to lower levels of hierarchical organization in electronic records, allowing individual items to be found regardless of whether or not they are maintained in the original order of creation.

Because the concept of original order in digital archives is so complex, some archivists have proposed developing new guidelines that apply to electronic records while still respecting the principles inherent to respect de fonds. Jinfang Niu has argued that "the arrangement of digital records is much less about maintaining the physical order of storage media, and instead is more about maintaining the conceptual relationships among electronic records because the physical order of digital records often needs to be altered for storage and preservation purposes."
