= Hollinger box =

Cardboard box used for preservation of documents

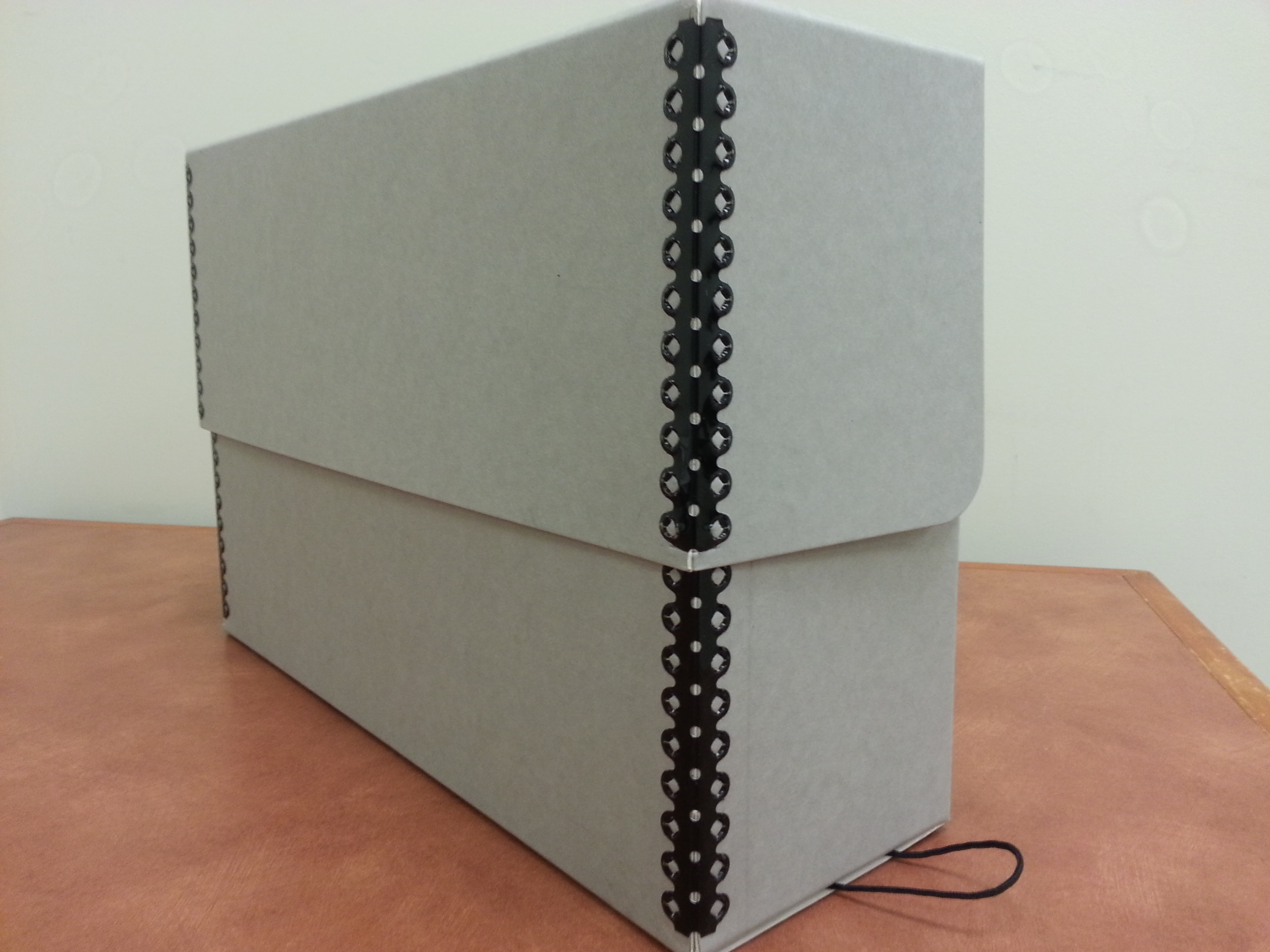
Hollinger box (angle view)

A Hollinger box, also known as a "document box" or "archives box," is a specially constructed cardboard box used in archives for preservation of documents and photographs. The term "Hollinger" refers to the manufacturer, Hollinger Metal Edge, a company founded in 1945 in Arlington, Virginia. Hollinger Metal Edge worked with officials at the Library of Congress and National Archives of the United States to develop acid free papers, storage boxes and envelopes that would preserve archival collections. The boxes are designed for long-term storage, and typically rest on standard library shelving. The Society of American Archivists defines it as a "container that holds folders containing paper documents vertically and that measures roughly 10 inches high, 12 or 15 inches wide, and 6 or 3 inches deep, and that usually has an integral top hinge at the upper back", although they are made in a variety of sizes for flat storage as well.
