= Archival processing =

Surveying, arranging, preserving collections

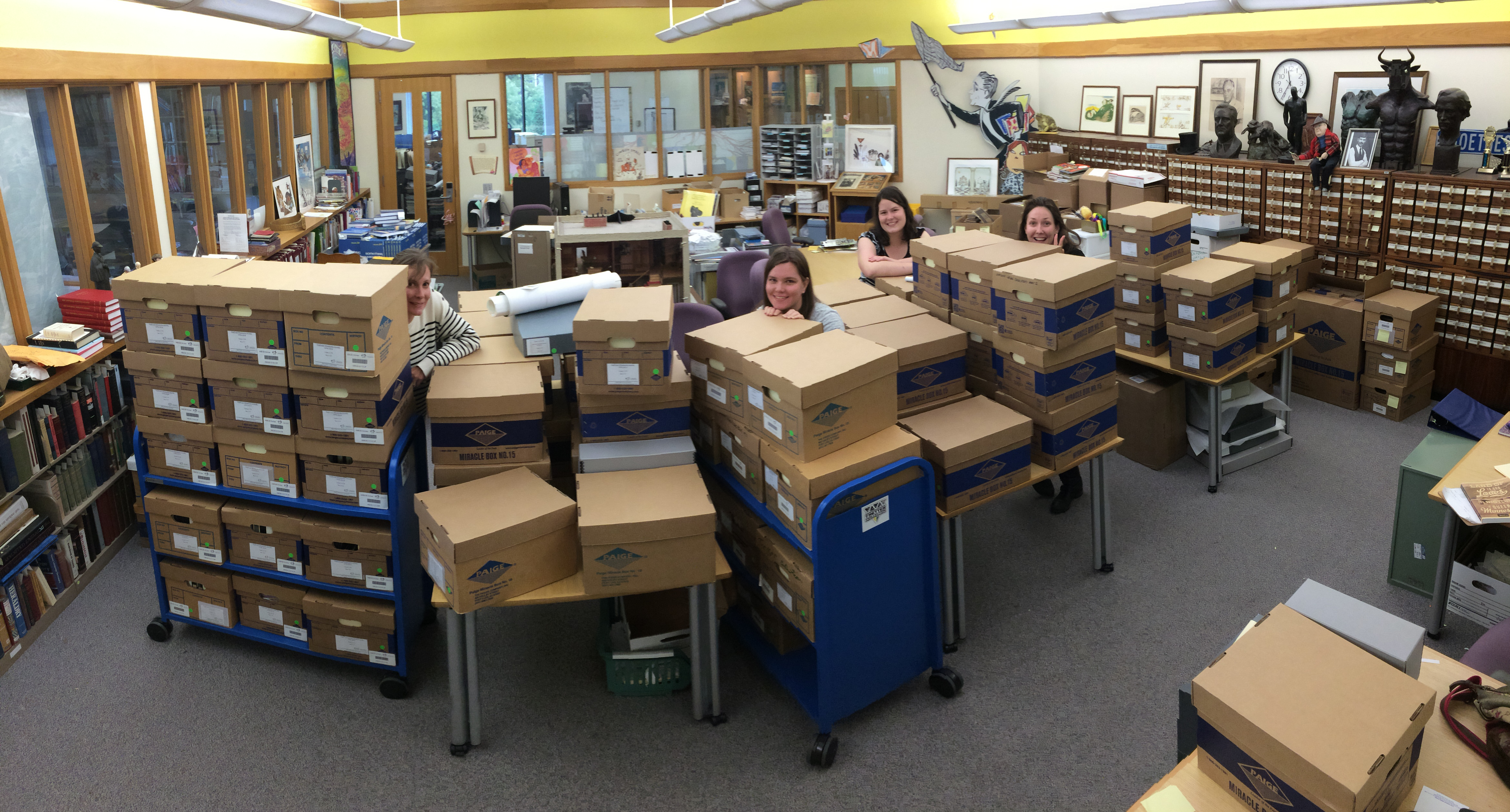
Archive staff and interns with a collection as part of a 12-month project to organize and describe 1,600 linear feet of archival materials

Archival processing is the act of surveying, arranging, describing, and performing basic preservation activities on the recorded material of an individual, family, or organization after they are permanently transferred to an archive. A person engaging in this activity is known as an archival processor, archival technician, or archivist.

Ideally, when an archives receives a collection of papers or a group of records, they will have been arranged by the originator (the original person, persons, or organization that created or assembled the collection or records) and boxed up for the move to the archives in such a way that this order has been preserved. However, collections and record groups are often semi-organized, and sometimes lack any discernible organization. Observing the organization of delivered materials, imposing organization where it is lacking, then describing the organized material are tasks covered by the terms "archival processing", "arrangement and description", "archival listing", or "cataloguing".

== Collection surveying ==
Boxes of records in archive processing room

The first step in archival processing is to survey the collection. The goal of a survey is to gain an understanding of the originator, determine the context of the creation of the collection, to observe the material's overall size and scope, to ascertain if the collection has access limitations, to locate any existing finding aids submitted with the collection, and to discover any underlying organizational scheme in the collection or record group.

Collection surveys should be carried out with an archival principle, respect des fonds, in mind. In following respect des fonds, which may be translated as "taking into consideration the entirety of the collection", the survey must include activity to ascertain whether the materials in hand are all, or only a portion, of the entire fonds. If the archivist is in a repository that holds other parts of the fonds, he or she should assemble a plan of work that encompasses, or at least acknowledges, the entire set of materials from the same originator.

Surveying collections is a strictly observational task, without making any changes or rearrangements to the materials. Because many organizations require use of a template or worksheet to ensure the surveys are thorough and consistent, the typical end products of a collection survey is a completed survey worksheet and a processing plan. After the completion of the survey, the materials may be made available to researchers without additional processing, stored for future processing when resources are available, or progress to processing immediately.

== Arrangement ==
Arrangement of materials should be completed with two archival principles that fall within respect des fonds in mind: provenance and original order.

According to the principle of provenance, an originator's materials should be maintained together and separated from those of other originators. Under the rules of provenance, maintenance of the materials must include making them searchable and retrievable together (known as their intellectual arrangement) and could include keeping them physically together, if it is practical to do so. Additionally, if the materials have changed hands beyond the originator, the provenance of an item includes all those who came after the creator and any changes they make to the collection such as insertions, deletions, rearranging.

According to the principle of original order, the originator's arrangement of the materials holds value, because it reflects how they originally used and accessed the collection, as well as how the records relate to each other, which can both inform the initial purpose of the records. Depending on the collection, rearrangement of the materials may not be required if a logical original order appears to have been maintained, the arrangement provides contextual clues about the purpose of the records and the arrangement does not interfere with researcher access to the materials. If rearrangement is required, archival processors will arrange the materials at the collection level, series level, subseries level, box level, folder level, or item level. The level of arrangement is determined by a number of factors, which include but are not limited to the orderliness of the material, the probable researcher interest and research value in the collection,^{[2]} and the policy and resources of the repository.

If arrangement tasks are required, arrangement is the first phase of physically processing the materials after the survey. In addition to rearranging the materials, there may also be weeding of material that does not meet a repository's collecting guidelines, as well as the preservation activities described below.

== Description ==
=== Levels of description ===
More detailed descriptions than that which results from a collection survey of the material are generally attempted. Beyond the survey, the individual processing the collection may create a listing of the "series" and "sub-series", listing of box contents (also called box-level description), folder lists (folder-level description), or even complete inventories that include administrative histories or biographical notes, scope notes, acquisition information, and information as to the archival processing treatment the material has received. Some repositories will conduct item-level description of selected documents within a collection or group of records, if the research value is deemed to be extremely high, heavy use is expected, or the risk of theft is heightened.

=== Finding aids ===
The written description of a collection is generically termed a finding aid. The main purpose of a finding aid is to facilitate access to a collection of materials by users, and can also useful for other archivists who provide reference services to the materials currently and in the future. The earliest finding aids were known as "calendars" and generally consisted of a listing of individual documents in chronological order, which was the preferred organizational method of historians, who were their primary users at the time. Currently used forms of finding aids vary in length and fall into several categories by type, with the inventory predominating in the late 20th and early 21st centuries. Many archives post their finding aids online to widen exposure to their holdings and some are encoded (see Standards section below) to facilitate recognition by web search engines.

=== Standards ===
Several standards govern archival description, some national and some international. ISAD(G), the General International Standard Archival Description, defines the elements that should be included in a finding aid. Other content standards also pertain. In the United States, proper names may be checked against the Library of Congress Name Authority Files and subject headings are drawn from the LCSH. Genre terms are often taken from the Art & Architecture Thesaurus. Many finding aids are encoded (marked up) in XML; in such cases, the Encoded Archival Description (EAD) standard can be used. In addition, repositories may follow local practices designed to make finding aids serve their particular mission.

The Society of American Archivists (SAA) has published a number of best practices for American archivists; two important ones are Archives, Personal Papers and Manuscripts, often abbreviated as APPM, and Describing Archives: A Content Standard (DACS). SAA's publication Standards for Archival Description: A Handbook provides an overview of relevant standards for all phases of archival and manuscripts processing. The Research Libraries Group has published a best practices document for use with EAD.

The Archives and Records Association, the British equivalent of the SAA, has published a number of best practices for U.K. archivists on topics ranging from school records retention to historical accounting records.

The Australian Society of Archivists published Describing Archives in Context: A Guide to Australasian Practice in 2004, which provides the basis for description using the Australian Series System. Series description is based on the primacy of the series as a basis for arrangement and description, rather than on fonds as is the practice in other jurisdictions.

== Preservation activities ==
Archival processing often includes basic preservation practices such as removing staples and paperclips, placing materials in acid-free folders and boxes, isolating acidic materials to avoid acid migration, photocopying damaged or acidic documents, and unfolding papers. There has been a trend for archives and manuscript repositories in the past few years to try new ways to reduce backlogs and provide access to materials as quickly as possible, described and encouraged by the 2005 article, "More Product, Less Process: Revamping Traditional Archival Processing" by Mark A. Greene and Dennis Meissner. Their method discourages these basic practices in the interest of accelerating processing to provide quicker access to researchers. Their argument also acknowledges the assumption of proper climate control in modern institutions, which would slow the deterioration of acidic paper and rusting of metal fasteners.

== See also ==
- Archival science
- Manuscript culture
- Finding aid
- ISAD(G)
- Records in Contexts
- Describing Archives: A Content Standard
- Encoded Archival Description
- Manual of Archival Description
- International Standard Archival Authority Record
