= International Standard Archival Authority Record =

An International Standard Archival Authority Record (ISAAR) is a form of authority control record, standardized by the Committee of Descriptive Standards of the International Council on Archives.

ISAAR (CPF) is the International Standard Archival Authority Record For Corporate Bodies, Persons and Families; its first edition was adopted by the committee in 1996, with a revised edition in 2003.

== See also ==
- ISAD(G)
- Records in Contexts
- Describing Archives: A Content Standard
- Encoded Archival Description
- Manual of Archival Description
- Archival processing
- Finding aid
