= Encoded Archival Description =

Standard for encoding archival record information

Encoded Archival Description (EAD) is a standard for encoding descriptive information regarding archival records.

== Overview ==
Archival records differ from the items in a library collection because they are unique, usually unpublished and unavailable elsewhere, and because they exist as part of a collection that unifies them. For these reasons, archival description involves a hierarchical and progressive analysis that emphasizes the intellectual structure and content of the collection and does not always extend to the level of individual items within it.

Following the development of technologies in the middle to late 1980s that enabled the descriptive encoding of machine-readable findings, it became possible to consider the development of digital finding aids for archives. Work on an encoding standard for archival description began in 1992 at the University of California, Berkeley, and in 1998 the first version of EAD was released. A second version was released in 2002, and the latest version, EAD3, was released in August 2015. The Society of American Archivists and the Library of Congress are jointly responsible for the maintenance and development of EAD.

EAD is now used around the world by archives, libraries, museums, national libraries and historical societies. Through a standardized system for encoding the descriptions of archival finding aids, EAD allows users to locate primary sources that are geographically remote. At its highest level, an EAD finding aid includes control information about the description as well as a description of the collection itself. EAD3 was revised in 2018 to address concerns relating to the ease of access to archival descriptions and its ability to interface with other systems.

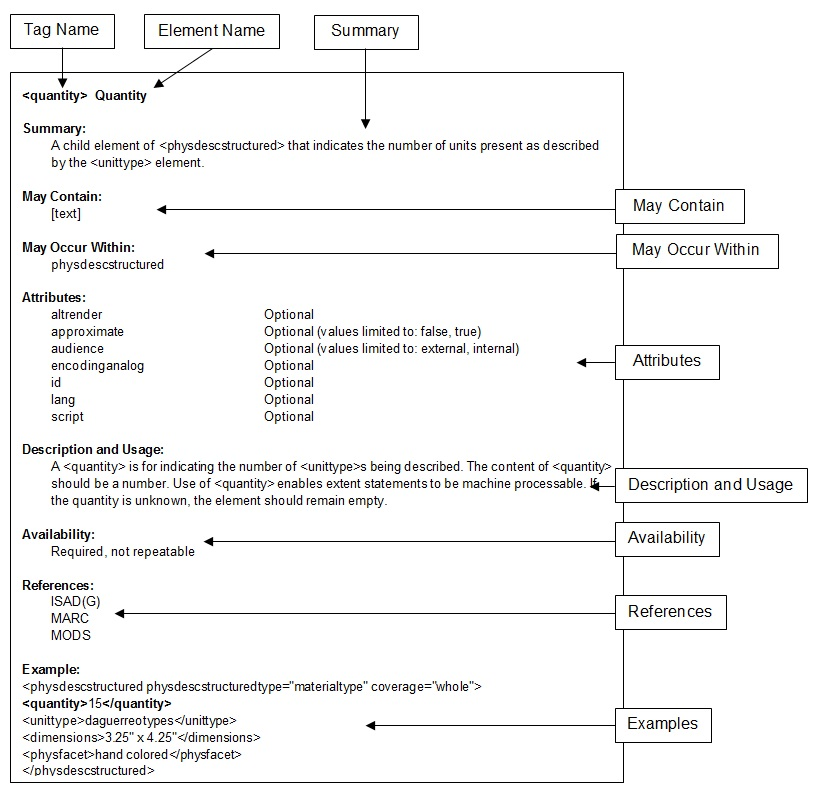
Example of Elements in the EAD3 Tag Library

== Background and need ==
Archives by their very nature are different from libraries. While libraries contain individual items, such as books and journals, of which multiple, identical copies exist, archives contain records that are both unique and interrelated. Archives represent the activities of a person, family or organization that are created and accumulated naturally in the course of their ordinary activities. In contrast to the items in a library, therefore, all the items in an archival collection share a relationship. The entire body of the records of an organization, family or individual have been created and accumulated as a byproduct of the organization or individual’s existence, and therefore share a common origin, which is referred to by archivists as its provenance; provenance refers to both the origin of an item or collection as well as its custody and ownership. Archivists refer to the entire body or records of an individual or organization as its fonds; the fonds is thus a conceptual whole that reflects the process of the production or accumulation of records that share a common function or activity and exhibit a natural unity. A fonds may contain anywhere from one item to millions of items, and may consist in any form, including manuscripts, charts, drawings, plans, maps, audio, video or electronic records.

Because published materials differ in significant and fundamental ways from the collections of interrelated and unique materials found in archives, there are significant differences in bibliographic and archival description. A bibliographic description represents an individual published item, is based on and derived from the physical item, and is thus considered item-level. Archival description, by contrast, represents a collection, or a fonds, often containing individual items of various media, sharing a common origin, or provenance. The description of archival materials, therefore, involves a complex hierarchical and progressive analysis. It begins by describing the whole, then moves down to subcomponents; the description frequently does not extend to the item level. In this way archival description focuses on the intellectual structure and content of the collection rather than its physical characteristics.

A finding aid is a tool that helps users to find materials within an archive through the description of its contents. Most findings aids provide similar types of information, including, at a minimum, a title that connects the finding aid to the creator of the collection; a summary of the material contained in the finding aid; background and context of the collection, including major figures involved; and information about the custody of the collection as well as any conditions or restrictions regarding its use.

The unique nature of archival records and the geographic distribution of individual collections has presented a challenge for those wishing to locate and access them for over 150 years. With the advent of international networked computing and online catalogs, however, the potential emerged for making archival collections searchable online.

== History ==
EAD originated at the 1993 Society of American Archivists annual meeting in New Orleans and was headed by Daniel Pitti at the University of California, Berkeley. The project's goal was to create a data standard for describing archives, similar to the MARC standards for describing bibliographic materials. The initial EAD Version 1.0 was released in the fall of 1998. Such a standard enables archives, museums, libraries, and manuscript repositories to list and describe their holdings in a manner that would be machine-readable and therefore easy to search, maintain and exchange. Since its inception, many archives and special collections have adopted it.

In addition to the development and maintenance work done by the Society of American Archivists and the Library of Congress, the Research Libraries Group (RLG) has developed and published a set of "Best Practice" implementation guidelines for EAD, which lays out mandatory, recommended, and optional elements and attributes. RLG has also provided a kind of clearinghouse for finding aids in EAD format, known as ArchiveGrid. Member libraries provide RLG the URL for their finding aids; RLG automatically harvests data from the finding aids, indexes it, and provides a search interface for the index, thus giving researchers the ability to search across several hundred institutions' collections with a single query. RLG also has developed the "RLG Report Card", an automated quality-checking program that will analyze an EAD instance and report any areas where it diverges from the best practices guidelines.

SAA's Technical Subcommittee for Encoded Archival Description, which include international representation, embarked on a revision of the EAD standard in 2010. The latest version, EAD3, was released in August 2015.

== Adoption ==
A number of repositories in the United States, Canada, the United Kingdom, France, Australia and elsewhere have adopted and implemented EAD with varying levels of technical sophistication. One of the most ambitious efforts is the Online Archive of California, a union catalog of over 5,000 EAD finding aids covering manuscripts and images from institutions across the state. The French National Library publishes more than 90,000 EAD finding aids covering archives and manuscripts.

== EAD element set ==
The EAD standard's XML schema specifies the elements to be used to describe a manuscript collection as well as the arrangement of those elements (for example, which elements are required, or which are permitted inside which other elements). The EAD tag set has 146 elements and is used both to describe a collection as a whole, and also to encode a detailed multi-level inventory of the collection. Many EAD elements have been, or can be, mapped to content standards (such as DACS and ISAD(G)) and other structural standards (such as MARC or Dublin Core), increasing the flexibility and interoperability of the data.

EAD 1.0 was an SGML document type definition (DTD). EAD 2002, the second incarnation of EAD, was finalized in December 2002 and made available as an XML DTD. The latest version of EAD, EAD3, is available as both an XML schema and a DTD.

== Parts of an EAD finding aid ==
Note: Examples in this section are EAD2, and may not be valid against the EAD3 schema.

=== eadheader ===
Note: In the current release of EAD3 1.0, the eadheader element has been replaced with the control element.

The first section of an EAD-encoded finding aid is the eadheader. This section contains the title and optional subtitle of the collection and detailed information about the finding aid itself: who created it, when it was created, its revision history, the language the finding aid is written in, and so on. The eadheader itself has a number of required attributes that map to various ISO standards such as ISO 3166-1 for country codes and ISO 8601 for date formats.

The eadheader and its child elements can be mapped to other standards for easy interchange of information. They are often mapped to Dublin Core elements such as Creator, Author, Language. For example, in the excerpt below the relatedencoding="DC" attribute of the eadheader element specifies that child elements will be mapped to Dublin Core; the child element <author encodinganalog="Creator"> indicates that the EAD element <author> maps to the Dublin Core element <creator>.

Example of an eadheader:

<eadheader audience="internal" countryencoding="iso3166-1" 
dateencoding="iso8601" langencoding="iso639-2b" 
relatedencoding="DC" repositoryencoding="iso15511" 
scriptencoding="iso15924">
   <eadid countrycode="us" identifier="bachrach_lf" mainagencycode="NSyU">bachrach_lf</eadid>
   <filedesc>
      <titlestmt>
         <titleproper encodinganalog="Title">Louis Fabian Bachrach Papers</titleproper>
         <subtitle>An inventory of his papers at Blank University</subtitle>
         <author encodinganalog="Creator">Mary Smith</author>
      </titlestmt>
      <publicationstmt>
         <publisher encodinganalog="Publisher">Blank University</publisher>
         <date encodinganalog="Date" normal="1981">1981</date>
      </publicationstmt>
   </filedesc>
   <profiledesc>
      <creation>John Jones
         <date normal="2006-09-13">13 Sep 2006</date>
      </creation>
      <langusage>
         <language encodinganalog="Language" langcode="eng">English</language>
      </langusage>
   </profiledesc>
</eadheader>

=== archdesc ===
The archdesc section contains the description of the collection material itself. First, the Descriptive Identification or did element contains a description of the collection as a whole, including the creator (which may be an individual or an organization), size (usually given in linear feet), inclusive dates, language(s), and an abstract or brief description. As with the eadheader above, elements may be mapped to corresponding standards; elements in this section are usually mapped to MARC elements. For example, in the excerpt below the relatedencoding="MARC21" attribute of the archdesc element specifies that child elements will be mapped to MARC21; the child element <unittitle encodinganalog="245$a" label="Title: "> indicates that the unittitle element maps to MARC field 245, subfield a.

Example:

<archdesc level="collection" type="inventory" relatedencoding="MARC21">
   <did>
      <head>Overview of the Collection</head>
      <repository encodinganalog="852$a" label="Repository: ">Blank University</repository>
      <origination label="Creator: ">
         <persname encodinganalog="100">Brightman, Samuel C. (Samuel Charles), 1911-1992</persname>
      </origination>
      <unittitle encodinganalog="245$a" label="Title: ">Samuel C. Brightman Papers</unittitle>
      <unitdate encodinganalog="245$f" normal="1932/1992" type="inclusive" label="Inclusive Dates: ">1932-1992</unitdate>
      <physdesc encodinganalog="300$a" label="Quantity: ">
         <extent>6 linear ft.</extent>
      </physdesc>
      <abstract encodinganalog="520$a" label="Abstract: ">
          Papers of the American journalist including some war correspondence, 
          political and political humor writings, and adult education material
      </abstract>
      <unitid encodinganalog="099" label="Identification: " countrycode="us" repositorycode="NSyU">2458163</unitid>
      <langmaterial label="Language: " encodinganalog="546">
         <language langcode="eng">English</language>
      </langmaterial>
   </did>
</archdesc>

Several additional descriptive elements may follow the did including:

- bioghist - biographic description of the person or organization
- scopecontent - a detailed narrative description of the collection material
- relatedmaterial - description of items which the repository acquired separately but which are related to this collection, and which a researcher might want to be aware of
- separatedmaterial - items which the repository acquired as part of this collection but which have been separated from it, perhaps for special treatment, storage needs, or cataloging
- controlaccess - a list of subject headings or keywords for the collection, usually drawn from an authoritative source such as Library of Congress Subject Headings or the Art and Architecture Thesaurus
- accessrestrict and userestrict - statement concerning any restrictions on the material in the collection
- arrangement - the way in which the materials in the collection are arranged

The second, and usually largest, section of the archdesc is the dsc, which contains a full inventory of the collection broken down into progressively smaller intellectual chunks. EAD offers two options: the c element which can be nested within itself to an unlimited level, and a set of numbered container elements c01 through c12 which can only be nested numerically (i.e. a c01 can contain only a c02; a c02 can contain only a c03, and so on). Note that the c and c0# elements refer to intellectual subdivisions of the material; the actual physical container is specified using the container element. The inventory may go down to as detailed a level as desired. The example below shows an inventory to the folder level.

Example of an inventory:

<dsc type="combined"><head>Inventory</head>
   <c01>
      <did>
        <unittitle>Correspondence</unittitle>
      </did>
      <c02>
         <did>
            <unittitle>Adams, Martha</unittitle>
            <unitdate normal="1962/1967">1962-1967</unitdate>
            <container type="box">1</container>
            <container type="folder">1</container>
         </did>
      </c02>
      <c02>
         <did>
            <unittitle>Barnett, Richard</unittitle>
            <unitdate normal="1965">1965</unitdate>
            <container type="box">1</container>
            <container type="folder">2</container>
         </did>
      </c02>
      ...etc
   </c01>
   <c01>
      <did>
        <unittitle>Writings</unittitle>
      </did>
      <c02>
         <did>
            <unittitle>Short stories</unittitle>
            <unitdate normal="1959/1979">1959-1979</unitdate>
            <container type="box">5</container>
            <container type="folder">1-9</container>
         </did>
      </c02>
   </c01>
</dsc>

== Citing EAD ==
There have been some studies about how to cite EAD files with variable granularity. In particular, Buneman and Silvello proposed a rule-based system to automatically create citation snippets to be used as references when citing XML data; a case study is based on EAD. Furthermore, Silvello proposed a framework, which learning from examples, automatically creates references at a different level of coarseness for XML files. This framework has been tested on the Library of Congress collection of EAD files.

== Criticism ==
A user study analyzing the user interaction patterns with finding aids highlighted that "[they] focus on rules for description rather than on facilitating access to and use of the materials they list and describe", and that many archive users have serious issues using finding aids. Common and frequent user interaction patterns with finding aids are navigational and thus they require to browse the archival hierarchy to make sense of the archival data.

Some critics claim that EAD constrains researcher interaction because several operations are either impossible or inefficient. For example, it is problematic to:

- let the user access a specific item on-the-fly, since it requires defining fixed access points to the archival hierarchy;
- let the user reconstruct the context of an item without browsing the whole archival hierarchy;
- present the user with only selected items from an archive, since the finding aid presents a given collection as a whole.

Furthermore, EAD allows for several degrees of freedom in tagging practice, which may turn out to be problematic in the automatic processing of EAD files, since it is difficult to know in advance how an institution will use the hierarchical elements. It has been underlined that only EAD files meeting stringent best practice guidelines are shareable and searchable.

== See also ==
- Encoded Archival Context (EAC)
- Metadata
- Metadata standards
- Extensible Markup Language (XML)
- ISAD(G)
- Records in Contexts
- Describing Archives: A Content Standard
- Manual of Archival Description
- International Standard Archival Authority Record
- Archival processing
- Finding aid
