= Finding aid =

Organization tool for archives

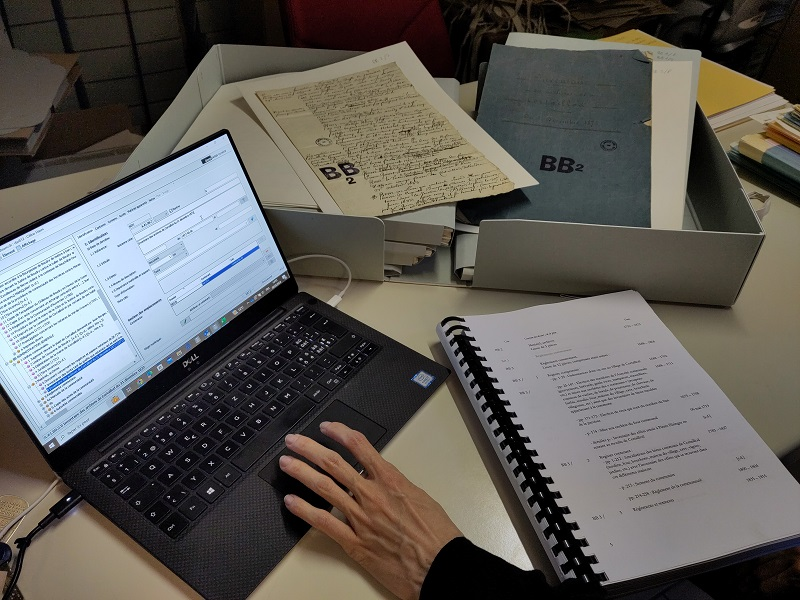
- Examples of both digital and paper finding aids

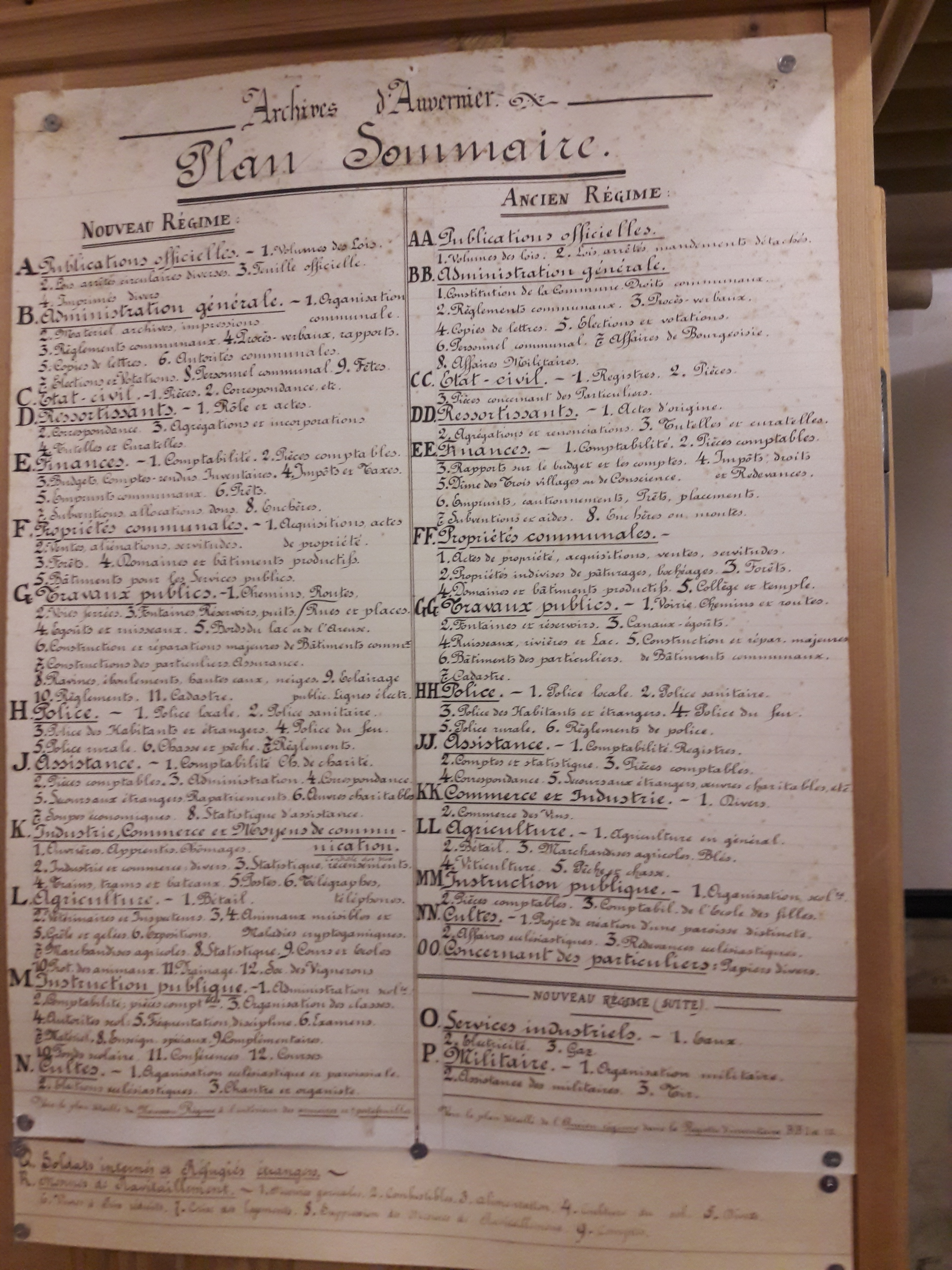
- An historical finding aid at the municipal archives in Auvernier

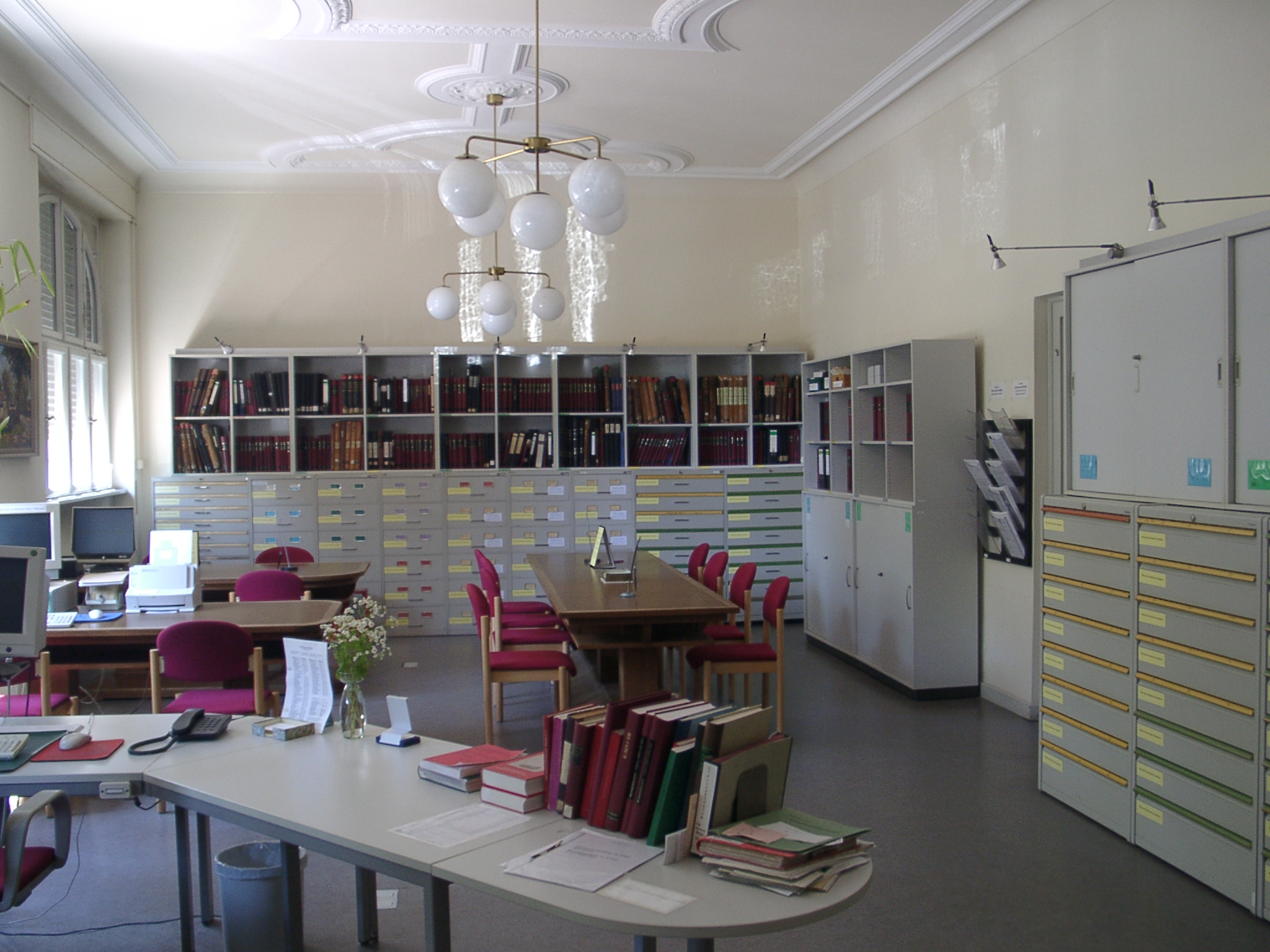
- The finding aids room at the Generallandesarchiv in Karlsruhe
- Uses: For archival research
- Types: Encoded Archival Description
- Related: library catalog; collection catalog

A finding aid, in the context of archival science and archival research, is an organization tool, a document containing detailed and processed metadata and other information about a specific collection of records within an archive. Finding aids often consist of a documentary inventory and description of the materials, their source, and their structure. The finding aid for a fonds is usually compiled by the collection's entity of origin, provenance, or by an archivist during archival processing, and may be considered the archival science equivalent of a library catalog or a museum collection catalog. The finding aid serves the purpose of locating specific information within the collection. The finding aid can also help the archival repository manage their materials and resources.

The history of finding aids mirrors the history of information. Ancient Sumerians had their own systems of indexes to locate bureaucratic and administrative records. Finding aids in the 19th and 20th centuries were paper documents, such as lists or index cards. In the 21st century, they can be created in electronic formats like spreadsheets or databases. The standard machine-readable format for manuscript collection finding aids, widely used in the United States, Canada, the United Kingdom, France, Australia and elsewhere, is Encoded Archival Description.

== Overview ==
Finding aids exist as a central tool for user and archivist interaction with archival collections. Freund and Toms note that finding aids became the preferred means of user mediation with a collection, as a result of the print nature of most historical materials. They go on to explain that the finding aid within this print-based form is designed to describe a single collection or arrangement from a similar provenance. Clayton McGehee argues that the finding aid became preferred by archivists and repositories as a means of organizing their collections because it allowed for them to intellectually and physically control the items they held. Archivists could acquire, deaccession, redact, and reorganize materials. The finding aids could reflect these changes to the collection, but also reflected that only the archivists would know about these changes to the collection. Paper based collections with finding aids ensured that patrons would have to rely upon the archivist to find and utilize materials.

The contents of finding aids may differ depending on the types of material being described. Usually, a finding aid includes a description of the scope of the collection, biographical and historical information related to the collection, and restrictions on use of or access to the materials. Finding aids may be detailed inventories that list contents. They may also include subject headings drawn from LCSH, AAT, or other controlled vocabulary, and may cross-refer to related collections in other repositories. The data elements essential to finding aids are defined by the International Council on Archives in the General International Standard Archival Description (ISAD(G)). Various national implementations of ISAD(G) exist, such as Describing Archives: A Content Standard, used in the US.

=== Creation ===
The process of creating a finding aid often begins with archival description. For example, Encoded Archival Description calls for a basic description of the collection, a list of controlled vocabulary terms, administrative information, biographical information, scope and content, arrangement, description of components, and other descriptive data. In the absence of a universal standard for finding aids, these elements are often used as a basis.

== Components ==
The Basic Description, Collection Overview, or Summary Information is usually the first section of a finding aid, containing information about the collection's creator, the physical space the collection occupies in the archive, and the date range and an abstract of its documents. A Biographical/Historical Note describes a collection from the perspective of the time period it was created, providing background information on a person or organization. It can also describe the history of the collection. The Scope and Content note briefly explains the collection's provenance, its arrangement and date range, and in general what kind of materials it contains—letters, reports, photographs, audio/video, etc.

The Access and Use section that contains information about using the collection, such as terms of access and restrictions. Usage issues that may affect researchers could include donor agreements restricting access, copyright information, the collection's history of ownership, any additional formats the collection may have, and if the collection is accepting additions. Additional Information contains details of related materials, language, citation instructions, any sponsors, and the date of processing. Search Terms are generally a list of subject headings, any personal, corporate, or family names, geographical headings, and genre terms that relate to the contents of the collection.

Arrangement is the manner in which the collection has been ordered (generally in accordance, as far as practicable, with its original order). Hierarchical levels of arrangement are typically composed of record groups containing series, which in turn contain boxes, folders, and items.

The Content List is a list of the collection's materials down to the box and folder level. Series descriptions containing the title, dates of coverage, and a brief description of the contents of each series. Series descriptions may also include the range of containers, a statement of the type of arrangement, and a note on any restrictions for each series (for example, an embargo on public access for a set period for reasons of confidentiality).

== Digitization and finding aids ==
=== Encoded Archival Description ===
Encoded Archival Description (EAD) was created in 1998 for the use of finding aids in an online environment. Its creation allowed for a consistent national standard in the US for finding aid terminology.

Candida Fenton writes, "Encoded Archival Description Document Type Definition (EAD DTD) is a non proprietary encoding standard which specifies the structure of an electronic archival finding aid. The standard was developed in response to the growing role of networks in accessing information describing archival holdings, and to enable the exchange of records between repositories."

However, the hierarchical format of EAD finding aids has caused some controversy among users, as archivists have noted that it perpetuates the same confusions regarding finding aids for users.

=== User interaction and finding aids ===
Freund and Toms asserted that collections become digitally accessible in greater frequency, archivists can no longer be expected to assist users at their every need. Clayton McGehee expressed concern about the lack of interaction between finding aids of different libraries and repositories. He argued that in order to remain in touch with the rapid share and spread of information, finding aids must interact with digital libraries. Laura Farley argued that both of these concerns about the speed of changing information and the need to adapt, could be supplemented by adding user annotations to online finding aids. Farley also noted that user submissions can help archivists highlight useful items not indicated in the extant finding aid. She concludes that

Online participatory finding aids with user annotations are feasible for a repository of any size and budget, and will result in more complete resources for users and archivists...To be successful in reaching users, archivists must open themselves to new collaborations with diverse communities beyond the academic world, relinquishing the role of record gatekeepers and inviting in open communication with users.

== See also ==
- Archival Science
- Archival Processing
- Calendar (archives)
- Fonds
- Encoded Archival Description
