= ISAD(G) =

Archival finding aid standard

The General International Standard Archival Description, abbreviated as ISAD(G), defines the elements that should be included in an archival finding aid. It was approved by the International Council on Archives (ICA) as an international standard for registering archival documents produced by corporations, persons and families.

== Overview ==
ISAD(G) defines a list of elements and rules for the description of archives, and describes the kinds of information that should be included in such descriptions. It creates a hierarchy of description that determines what information should be included at what level.

ISAD(G) follows four general principles: multilevel description, information relevant to the level of description, linking of descriptions, and non-repetition of information. Multilevel description starts from a general level of description, which is usually the fonds, and proceeds to more detailed levels, such as the subfonds, the series, the file, and the item. This hierarchical structure must be represented and properly defined in the archival description. Information in each level of description must be related only to the archival unit described in that level. Every archival unit must be linked to its parent level within the hierarchy, and its level must be made explicit. To avoid repetition, general information common to a group must be declared in the highest level possible. Sublevels must, in turn, contain common information applicable to its child levels.

== History ==
The advent of the internet and electronic records changed the way curators conceived archives. With ability to interrelate archives around the world, there was a need to standardize archival descriptions.

With initial activities beginning in 1988 and supported by UNESCO, a subgroup of the AdHoc Commission on Descriptive Standards discussed the first draft of ISAD(G) beginning in 1990. The first version of ISAD(G) was released and adopted by the ICA in 1994. In 1999, an evaluation of ISAD(G) was conducted to determine its effectiveness of describing datasets and to evaluate how it had been being used in data archives. The ICA published a revised version in 2000. Sometimes abbreviated as ISAD(G)2, the revised version remains the current standard.

== Adoption ==
ISAD(G) has been adopted as the standard for archival description by many national and international institutions.

=== National organizations ===
In the United States, the implementation of ISAD(G) by the Society of American Archivists is described in Describing Archives: A Content Standard (2006).

In the United Kingdom, ISAD(G) was adopted by The National Archives Cataloguing Standards in 2000.

In Canada, ISAD(G) was implemented alongside ISAAR(CPF) in the second edition of Rules for Archival Description (RAD2) by the Canadian Council on Archives in 2005.

In Brazil, ISAD(G) was adopted by the Conselho Nacional de Arquivos (Conarq) and implemented in the Norma Brasileira de Descrição Arquivística (Brazilian Standard for Archival Description) in 2006.

=== Transnational organizations ===
The World Bank Group has adopted ISAD(G) as the standard for description of its archival records. Each record has at least one level (fonds); where multiple levels are available, they are presented in a tree format. The World Bank Group Archive is arranged into fonds using EAD XML schemas with metadata for the description or archival content following ISAD(G).

UNESCO Archives are organized using the AtoM database and adhere to ISAD(G) for archival description.

== Compatibility with other archival protocols ==
ISAD(G) has been implemented by institutions with other protocols such as ISO 15489 record management protocol or the ISAAR (CPF) standard for archival authority records. ISAD(G) has been mapped into archival finding aids protocols such as Encoded Archival Description (EAD) and structure standards like Dublin Core.

EAD uses XML schemas to encode content descriptions mapped to ISAD(G) standards as a guide to determine required data elements and hierarchical relations between said elements. These protocols are not exclusive but complementary. ISAD(G) is not as specific as EAD with respect to finding aid data, but it offers a useful model for determining both essential elements and the amount of descriptive detail an archivist may wish to gather at each hierarchical level.

== Elements ==
ISAD(G) defines 26 data elements of description, 6 of which are considered essential, divided into 7 areas. The standard provides a framework for a common approach, rather than a rigid format.

ISAD(G) elements of description
Area	Field	Field description	Essential
Identity statement	Reference codes	Elements used to unequivocally identify the unit of description: country code, repository code, specific local reference code/control number/other unique identifier	Yes
Identity statement	Title	Name for the unit of description	Yes
Identity statement	Date	Dates of record creation during the conduction of affairs or dates of document creation	Yes
Identity statement	Level of description	Level of the unit of description within the hierarchy	Yes
Identity statement	Extent and medium of the unit of description	Physical or logical extent and medium of the unit of description	Yes
Context	Name	Creator of the unit of description	Yes
Context	Administrative/biographical history	Biographical or administrative details pertaining to the creators of the unit of description	No
Context	Archival history	Relevant historical information on the unit of description	No
Context	Immediate source of acquisition or transfer	Source of acquisition of the material	No
Content and Structure	Scope and content	Summary of scope and content relevant to the level of description	No
Content and Structure	Appraisal, destruction and scheduling information	Appraisal, destruction and scheduling actions taken on or planned for the unit of description	No
Content and Structure	Accruals	Planned additions to the unit of description	No
Content and Structure	System of arrangement	To provide information on the internal structure, the order and/or the system of classification of the unit of description	No
Conditions of Access and Use	Conditions governing access	Information on legal status that may affect access to the unit of description	No
Conditions of Access and Use	Conditions governing reproduction	Conditions for the reproduction of the unit of description after creation	No
Conditions of Access and Use	Language/scripts of material	Languages, scripts and symbol systems used in the unit of description	No
Conditions of Access and Use	Physical characteristics and technical requirements	Relevant physical conditions, software and hardware requirements for the access and preservation of the unit of description	No
Conditions of Access and Use	Finding aids	Finding aids applicable to the unit of description	No
Allied Materials	Existence and location of originals	Information about the existence or destruction of the original unit of description	No
Allied Materials	Existence and location of copies	Information about the existence and availability of copies of the unit of description	No
Allied Materials	Related units of description	Information about units of description related by provenance or other associations with the unit of description	No
Allied Materials	Publication note	Publications that are about or are based on the use, study, or analysis of the unit of description	No
Notes	Note	Information that does not fit in any of the previous areas	No
Description Control	Archivist's note	Information on who prepared the description and how	No
Description Control	Rules or conventions	Protocols on which the description is based	No
Description Control	Date(s) of descriptions	Dates of creation and revision	No

== See also ==
- Records in Contexts
- Describing Archives: A Content Standard
- Archival processing
