= Collections management system =

Software for managing museum collections

A Collections Management System (CMS), sometimes called a Collections Information System, is software used by the collections staff of a collecting institution or by individual private collectors and collecting hobbyists or enthusiasts to manage collection objects. Collecting institutions are primarily museums and archives and cover a very broad range from huge, international institutions, to very small or niche-specialty institutions such as local historical museums and preservation societies. Secondarily, libraries and galleries are also collecting institutions. Collections Management Systems (CMSs) allow individuals or collecting institutions to organize, control, and manage their collections' objects by “tracking all information related to and about” those objects. In larger institutions, the CMS may be used by collections staff such as registrars, collections managers, and curators to record information such as object locations, provenance, curatorial information, conservation reports, professional appraisals, and exhibition histories. All of this recorded information is then also accessed and used by other institutional departments such as “education, membership, accounting, and administration."

Though early Collections Management Systems were cataloging databases, essentially digital versions of card catalogs, more recent and advanced systems are being used to improve communication between museum staff and to automate and manage collections-based tasks and workflows. Collections Management Systems are also used to provide access to information about an institution's collections and objects to academic researchers, institutional volunteers, and the public, increasingly through online methods.

== Development and history of collections management systems ==
Ever since machine-readable standards were developed for libraries in the 1960s, museums have had an interest in utilizing computers to record information about their collections. However, museums have very different needs from libraries; while bibliographic information about a library collection object is usually static, museum records are ever-changing because of the continuous need for new information about museum objects to be added to the records. As early as 1967, the Museum Computer Network (MCN), an informal group of New York museums, attempted to create a collections management database called GRIPHOS, and at a Metropolitan Museum of Art and IBM conference in 1968, speakers discussed current and proposed projects to automate collections management. In an effort to coordinate research into developing these systems, professional associations such as the Museum Data Bank Coordinating Committee (MDBCC), formed in 1972, were created to disseminate information about computers and databases to museums interested implementing computerized collections systems. During the 1980s, Collections Management Systems became more advanced with the rise of relational databases that “[relate] each piece of data to every other piece," and during this time some of today's popular systems were originally developed for specific institutions “based on generic relational databases” — such as Gallery Systems' The Museum System for the Metropolitan Museum of Art and Re:discovery Software's Proficio for the Thomas Jefferson Foundation's Monticello — before being released as commercial products. During the 1990s, with computers becoming faster and cheaper and with the rise of the Internet, collections management software became much more sophisticated, able to “present images, sort information in any one of a myriad of configurations, record exhibition information, track locations, and interface with a museum Website."

Though the goal during the 1960s was to use computers for collections record-keeping for purposes of accountability, MCN Executive Director Everett Ellin warned that museum professionals should include public access as a goal because it would “not be worth the effort if museums only create a glorified record-keeping system." Collections Management Systems have become crucial tools in increasing public access to collections information, expanding the types of information that are recorded. What was once “a simple tool for collections care and inventory” has become “a robust and powerful instrument for saving all information about museum objects," including interpretive material, digital objects, and digital surrogates. Since some Collections Management Systems now incorporate Digital Asset Management and content information storage, many museum professionals have started to use the acronym CMS to stand for “Content Management System."

== Information managed in collections management systems ==
In 1997, art historian and museum information studies consultant Robert A. Baron outlined the requirements for Collections Management Systems, not as a list of the kinds of collections object information that should be recorded, but rather as a list of collections activities such as administration, loan, exhibition, preservation, and retrieval, tasks that museums had been responsible for long before the invention of computers, and many modern Collections Management Systems go beyond cataloging by aiding in the management of these processes and workflows. The Canadian Heritage Information Network (CHIN) Collections Management Software Criteria Checklist (CMSCC), which aims to be a comprehensive list of the kinds of information that a museum may want to record in a CMS, organizes that list by processes and actions rather than type of information. The checklist “outlines a number of features commonly included in a commercial CMS, which can assist a museum in determining which features have priority.”

=== Object entry ===
Managing and documenting information and tasks related to objects entering the museum, including acquisition or loan records, receipts, record of the reason for the deposit of the object, and record of the object's return to its owner.

=== Acquisition ===
The management and documentation of objects added to the institution's collection, including accession numbers, catalog numbers, object name or title, acquisition date, acquisition method, and transfer of title. There are many different accession numbering systems, and a CMS should allow an institution to use its existing numbering system.

=== Inventory control ===
Identification of objects for which the institution has a legal responsibility, including loaned objects and objects that have not been accessioned. Information recorded includes object location and status.

=== Location and movement control ===
Records of an object's current and past locations within the institution's premises so that it can be located, including dates of movement and authorizations for movement.

=== Catalog description ===
Information that describes and identifies objects, including creator/maker/artist, date(s) of creation, place of creation, provenance, object history, research on the object, and connections to other objects.

=== Conservation management ===
The management of information about an object's conservation “from a curatorial and collections management perspective," including conservation requests, examination records, condition reports, records of preventative actions, and treatment histories.

=== Risk management ===
Management of information about potential threats to collections objects, including documentation of specific threats, records of preventative measures, disaster plans and procedures, and emergency contacts.

=== Insurance management and valuation control ===
Documentation of insurance needs for objects for which the institution is responsible (included loaned objects) as well as the monetary value of objects for insurance purposes. This may include the names and contact information of appraisers as well as appraisal history.

=== Exhibition management ===
Management of an object's exhibition or display, including exhibition history and documentation of research done on an object for an exhibition. More advanced Collections Management Systems may have the ability to present information from the system on a museum's website or in an online exhibit.

=== Dispatch/shipping/transport ===
Management of objects leaving the institution's premises and being transferred to a different location, including location information, packing notes, crate dimensions, authorizations, customs information and documenting the means of transportation (including courier information).

=== Loaning and borrowing ===
Managing the temporary transfer of responsibility of an object from the museum to another institution or vice versa, including loan agreements, loan history, records of costs and payments, packing lists, venue information, facilities reports, and records of overdue loans.

=== Deaccessioning and disposal ===
Management and documentation of objects being deaccessioned and leaving the institution's collection, either by transfer, sale, exchange, or destruction/loss, including transfer of title, records of approval, and reason for disposal.

== Features of collections management systems ==
=== Functionality ===
A Collections Management System should be able to store data, edit data, delete data, access data through queries, sort data, and output data in the form of reports. Data is stored in the form of tables and is entered into the system (and sometimes edited) using forms. Queries are searches that help retrieve specific data from the system, and reports “are the means by which the results of a query are displayed or printed."

=== Flexibility ===
An efficient CMS, like a good relational database, should not have duplicate records and should not require that the same information be recorded in more than one place in the system. At the same time, the system should be flexible enough to accommodate more data as the collections expand. The user must also understand that not all information must be entered into a Collections Management System; for example, complex information such as complicated dimensions and measurements. Some institutions may not want to record confidential information such as private donor information in a CMS and instead keep it in a manual file or a separate, secure digital file, with pointers to the file's location recorded in the CMS. However, others argue that such confidential information should be recorded in the CMS to protect the information in the event of a disaster where manual files may be destroyed.

=== Backup and redundancy ===
A CMS should have "a built in backup and recovery process" to protect data against not only equipment failure and disaster but also human error, which may result in loss or corruption of data. Redundant copies of the information should be stored in multiple locations, and the backup process may be automated.

=== Data standards ===
Because a computerized system “demands a much greater degree of precision in the use of language for cataloging and data retrieval than does a manual system,” data and metadata standards should be applied in a Collections Management System. Data standards provide rules for how information is entered into the system, and data that has been entered into the system in a consistent manner allows for more accurate and precise information retrieval and for easier exchange of data between different systems.

The three types of data standards are structure, content, and value:

- Data structure standards describe the fields and categories of information (sometimes called elements) that are required to identify an object. In a museum CMS, these fields often include accession number, title/name of object, maker/creator of object, place of creation/origin, date of creation, dimensions, material, and source of object (for example, name of donor or seller). Examples of widely used data structure standards used for cultural objects are the Dublin Core Metadata Element Set (DC), Categories for the Description of Works of Art (CDWA), the MARC formats, the element sets of Cataloging of Cultural Objects (CCO), and the VRA (Visual Resources Association) Core Categories.
- Data content standards provide guidelines for the formatting of information being entered into the fields, “controlling the syntax, style, grammar, and abbreviations” that should be used. Examples of data content standards used in institutions that collect cultural objects include Cataloging of Cultural Objects (CCO) and Describing Archives: A Content Standard (DACS).
- Data value standards provide the preferred terms and vocabulary to be used in the fields, often in the form of authority lists, lexicons, data dictionaries, and thesauri. Examples include the Getty's Art and Architecture Thesaurus (AAT) and Thesaurus of Geographic Names (TGN), Nomenclature 4.0 for Museum Cataloguing, and Iconclass.

While most of these data standards apply to the cataloging and description of cultural objects, efforts are also being made to create data standards for natural history collections. Based on Dublin Core, the Darwin Core (DwC) standard is a data structure standard for biodiversity information whose “glossary of terms” are the “fields” and “elements” needed to catalog biological and natural history specimens and samples.

Recognizing the importance of data standards to many users, some developers advertise that their Collections Management Systems are compliant with certain standards. For example, the Adlib Museum CMS is “certified as SPECTRUM compliant by the Collections Trust” and “also incorporates other international standards such as the ‘CIDOC’ guidelines and Getty ‘Object ID.’”

=== Security and access ===
A Collections Management System should have security measures that “ensure that only authorized persons are able to enter, edit, or view” information contained in the system. However, there is a growing demand for public access to some of the collections and object information contained in the CMS, which “helps fulfill a museum's mission to educate the public and prove that the objects held in public trust are used to public benefit” while also encouraging collections staff to “support basic collection stewardship” by ensuring that information about the object is accurate before being made publicly accessible. The system should allow the public to be able to make and refine searches of publicly accessible information in the system.

=== Rights and reproductions ===
A CMS should also allow collections staff to manage information on reproduction rights of the objects for which the institution is responsible, including type of copyright scheme being applied (for example, U.S. copyright or Creative Commons license), copyright ownership, and digital watermarks.

== Considerations when selecting a system ==
Since every museum has different needs, a museum should make a needs assessment before selecting a Collections Management System. The museum should determine what collections processes it needs the system to manage. The museum should also identify who will be using the system and consider such factors as collection size (both present and future), staff technology skills, and budget/pricing. Another recommendation is to map out both the short- and long-term goals for the new CMS and then determine how the system can help increase the museum's efficiencies.

=== Local and remote access to CMS software and data ===
Local CMS software installation on a stand-alone computer may allow the quickest access to data but has the most limited access as well as a high maintenance responsibility and data backup protocol falls on the museum. A CMS installed on a local network may allow for wider access within the museum.

A CMS as software as a service (SaaS) platform is software installed online and accessible through the web to an internet capable computer. Maintenance responsibility falls on the company and backups are usually ensured by the company. Data access can be slow, dependent on connection however.

=== Open source and closed source software ===
Open source software

Software whose license allows its source code to be published and made available to the public, enabling anyone to copy, modify and redistribute the source code without paying royalties or fees. Users and developers have access to the core designing functionalities. This enables them to modify or add features to the source code and redistribute it.

Closed source software

Software that involves the use of constraints on what can be done with the software and the restriction of access to the original source code. The end-user purchases the right to use the software. To this end, the source code to closed-source software is considered a trade secret by its manufacturers.

== Conservation information management systems ==
Collections Management Systems have their origins in cataloging and registration, and consequently, most systems manage information and records “from a curatorial and collections management perspective." Conservation information in these systems is often limited to condition reporting and documentation of treatment history. While some advanced systems allow registrars to manage workflow tasks such as approvals and receipts, most systems are unable to manage conservation workflows. Many conservators also need a system that can not only store and manage conservation documentation but also easily share that information with other conservators and institutions.
