= Cultural Objects Name Authority =

The Cultural Objects Name Authority (CONA) is a project by the Getty Research Institute to create a controlled vocabulary containing authority records for cultural works, including architecture and movable works such as paintings, sculpture, prints, drawings, manuscripts, photographs, textiles, ceramics, furniture, other visual media such as frescoes and architectural sculpture, performance art, archaeological artifacts, and various functional objects that are from the realm of material culture and of the type collected by museums. The focus of CONA is works cataloged in scholarly literature, museum collections, visual resources collections, archives, libraries, and indexing projects with a primary emphasis on art, architecture, or archaeology. The target users are the visual resources, academic, and museum communities.

In the CONA database, each work's record (also called a subject in the database, not to be confused with iconographical depicted subjects of art works) is identified by a unique numeric ID. Linked to each work's record are titles/names, current location, dates, other fields, related works, a parent (that is, a position in the hierarchy), sources for the data, and notes. By using terms from all four Getty Vocabularies to control many of these fields, CONA uses linked data principles to pull together multiple vocabularies in the creation of an authority file for works of art. The coverage of CONA is global, from prehistory through the present.

== History ==
Detailed discussions regarding the Getty Vocabulary Program compiling a vocabulary comprising unique numeric identifiers and brief records for art works began in 2004. It was determined that various Getty projects collected data for movable works and architecture that could form an initial data set, upon which other contributors could build over time. The project was enthusiastically embraced by the user community. In 2005 mapping of the data model used for all three existing vocabularies (the Art & Architecture Thesaurus (AAT), the Getty Thesaurus of Geographic Names (TGN), and the Union List of Artist Names (ULAN)) to potential CONA fields was completed. The effort coincided with the development of CCO (Cataloging Cultural Objects), a more concise offshoot of the CDWA (Categories for the Description of Works of Art), and CDWA Lite, which is an XML schema intended to serve as an exchange format for art information. Both CCO and CDWA, which reflect consensus in the user community of best practice in cataloging art and architecture, lay out the required fields and rules for cataloging art objects.

Technical development of CONA began in 2010. The editorial system and online search screens for CONA are similar to those used for the existing Getty vocabularies. The data is compiled and edited in an editorial system that was custom-built by Getty technical staff to meet the unique requirements of compiling data from many contributors, building complex and changing polyhierarchies, merging, moving, and publishing in various formats. Final editorial control of CONA is maintained by the Getty Vocabulary Program, using well-established editorial rules.

Contributions to CONA from the user community commenced in 2012. A pilot release of CONA with a limited number of records is currently available online. The growth and utility of CONA will depend upon contributions from users. As with the AAT, TGN, and ULAN, CONA will grow and change via contributions from the user community and editorial work of the Getty Vocabulary Program.

The current manager of the Getty vocabularies is Patricia Harpring, Managing Editor. Administratively, the Vocabulary Program resides under the GRI Collection Management and Description Division (David Farneth, Head). Other GRI departments in this division are General Collection Cataloging, Special Collections Cataloging, Digital Services, the Registrar's Office, Institutional Records and Archives, and Conservation and Preservation. The Vocabulary Program works with Digital Art History Access (Murtha Baca, Head) to foster foreign language translations of the vocabularies, maintain national and international partnerships, and oversee licensing and marketing.

== Terms ==
The focus of each CONA record is a work of art or architecture. Each work is identified with a unique and persistent numeric ID, which aids in the disambiguation of similar works. There are many fields in CONA, however through titles/names (equivalence relationships), as well as hierarchical and associative relationships, the basic structure of CONA is that of a thesaurus in compliance with ISO and NISO standards. Names or titles may be current, historical, and in various languages.

== Design ==
Although it may be displayed as a list, CONA is a hierarchical database; its trees branch from a root called Top of the CONA hierarchy (Subject_ID: 700000000). There may be multiple broader contexts, making CONA polyhierarchical. In addition to the hierarchical relationships (e.g., between a print and the larger volume to which it belongs), CONA has equivalence relationships (between equivalent titles/names) and associative relationships (e.g., between a sketch and the final work). The primary top divisions of CONA are the facets Built Work and Movable Work.

With the exception of performance art, CONA records unique physical works. However, CONA may include works that were never built or that no longer exist, for example designs for a building that was not constructed or a work that has been destroyed.

Built Works: Built works within the scope of CONA are architecture, which includes structures or parts of structures that are the result of conscious construction, are of practical use, are relatively stable and permanent, and are of a size and scale appropriate for—but not limited to—habitable buildings. Most built works in CONA are manifestations of the built environment that is typically classified as fine art, meaning it is generally considered to have aesthetic value, was designed by an architect (whether or not his or her name is known), and constructed with skilled labor.

Movable Works: The term movable works is borrowed from legal jargon, referring to tangible objects capable of being moved or conveyed from one place to another, as opposed to real estate or other buildings. It is useful to separate the two types of works—built works and movable works—into different facets in CONA because movable works typically are located in a repository, have a repository identification number, have a provenance of former locations, and other characteristics that typically differ from architecture.

Movable works within the scope of CONA include the visual arts that are of the type collected by art museums, although the objects themselves may actually be held by an ethnographic, anthropological, or other museum, or owned by a private collector. Performance art is included in CONA under this facet as well.

The minimum fields and editorial rules of CONA are in compliance with CDWA and CCO. The minimum fields are the following: Catalog Level, Object/Work Type, Title or Name, Creator, Creation Date, Measurements, Materials and Techniques, Depicted Subject, and Current Location.

== See also ==
- Art and Architecture Thesaurus (AAT)
- Getty Thesaurus of Geographic Names (TGN)
- Union List of Artist Names (ULAN)
- Categories for the Description of Works of Art (CDWA)
- Cataloging Cultural Objects (CCO)
- Getty Vocabulary Program
