= Getty Vocabulary Program =

Getty Center department that produces and maintains controlled vocabulary databases

The Getty Vocabulary Program is a department within the Getty Research Institute at the Getty Center in Los Angeles, California. It produces and maintains the Getty controlled vocabulary databases, Art and Architecture Thesaurus, Union List of Artist Names, and Getty Thesaurus of Geographic Names. They are compliant with ISO and NISO standards for thesaurus construction. The Getty vocabularies are the premiere references for categorizing works of art, architecture, material culture, and the names of artists, architects, and geographic names. They have been the life work of many people and continue to be critical contributions to cultural heritage information management and documentation. They contain terms, names, and other information about people, places, things, and concepts relating to art, architecture, and material culture. They can be accessed online free of charge on the Getty website.

== Usage ==
The Getty vocabularies can be used in three ways: at the data entry stage, by catalogers or indexers who are describing works of art, architecture, material culture, archival materials, visual surrogates, or bibliographic materials; as knowledge bases, providing information for researchers; and as search assistants to enhance end-user access to online resources. The Getty vocabularies are available in MARC format for easy mapping.

The Getty Vocabulary Program has been active within the library community, offering training on thesaurus construction and training on contributing via Getty online webforms. These opportunities are held during annual conferences of organizations such as Art Libraries Society of North America (ARLIS), Visual Resources Association (VRA), American Library Association (ALA), International Federation of Library Associations and Institutions (IFLA), NFAIS, Society of American Archivists (SAA), and Museum Computer Network (MCN).

== History ==
Editorial work has been managed by the Getty since 1983. In 1987 the Getty created a department dedicated to compiling and distributing terminology called the Vocabulary Coordination Group, now known as the Getty Vocabulary Program, which was within the Getty Information Institute. The data is compiled and edited in an editorial system that was custom-built by Getty technical staff to meet the unique requirements of compiling data from many contributors, building complex and changing polyhierarchies, merging, moving, and publishing in various formats. Final editorial control of the Vocabularies are maintained by the Getty Vocabulary Program, using well-established editorial rules. They are now published in automated formats only, in both a searchable online Web interface and in data files available for licensing.

Since 1998, Getty Information Technology Services and Web Services have worked closely with the Getty Vocabulary Program to conceive, develop, deploy, and continuously enhance the technologies necessary to support the growth and usage of the vocabulary databases. Three major projects comprise the work completed to date. First, the Vocabulary Coordination System (VCS) project created a single production system that replaced three separate, outdated and disparate data collection and editorial systems that had been used to produce the three vocabularies. The new, more powerful production engine allows Getty staff to efficiently collect, analyze, edit, merge and distribute terminology from Getty departments, as well as from external collaborating institutions. Second, the Vocabularies on the Web project produced unified Web-based access to the three Getty vocabularies and made them available to hundreds of thousands of researchers, scholars, and members of the general public who are interested in the subject areas covered by the vocabularies. This project also enhanced security to protect the Getty's intellectual property, and added measurement metrics to allow the Getty to gauge the usage volume, usage patterns, and the success of these efforts. Finally, the Vocabulary Contributions project created processes and procedures for making use of and contributing to the vocabulary databases an integral part of the work in all relevant Getty and external projects.

In 2000, the Getty Vocabulary Program was moved from its Santa Monica office to its current location within the Getty Research Institute at the Getty Center.

== Awards and recognition ==
The Getty Vocabulary Program won the Computerworld Honors for 2007 in the category of Media Arts and Entertainment for Web-Based Global Art Resources.

== Organizations that cite or use the Getty Vocabularies ==
- Canadian Heritage CHIN Standards Organizations
- ICOM-CIDOC The International Committee for Documentation of the International Council of Museums (ICOM-CIDOC)
- Intute: Arts and Humanities
- Library of Congress LC Authority Files
- Museum Computer Network (MCN) in Taiwan Taiwan e-Learning and Digital Archives Program (TELDAP)
- The Frick Collection Frick Art Reference Library: Electronic Resources
- University of Sydney USYD Library: Museum Studies Internet Resources

== See also ==
- Art & Architecture Thesaurus (AAT)
- Categories for the Description of Works of Art (CDWA)
- Cultural Objects Name Authority (CONA)
- Getty Thesaurus of Geographic Names (TGN)
- Union List of Artist Names (ULAN)
