= Basil Hunnisett =

English academic

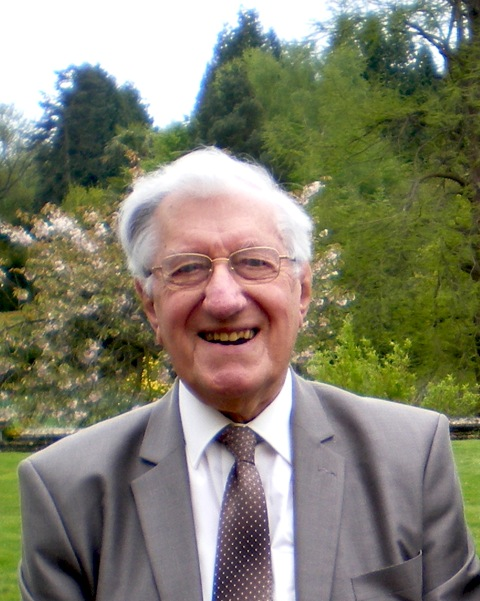
- Born: 5 July 1923
- Died: 15 October 2013 (aged 90)
- Education: MA PhD FRSA FLA
- Occupations: Librarian, lecturer and author
- Notable work: Steel Engraved Book Illustrations in England. Dictionary of British Steel Engravers. Engraved On Steel: History of Picture Production Using Steel Plates

Basil Hunnisett (5 July 1923 – 15 October 2013) was an English librarian, academic, lecturer and author specialising in steel engraving, historical bibliography, history of libraries and fine art librarianship. He wrote three books on steel engraving and was among the first to cover the subject in detail. He also contributed to the Oxford Dictionary of National Biography, the Grove Dictionary of Art and several specialist arts magazines.

== Early life and education ==
Hunnisett was educated at Lewes County Grammar School, Lewes, East Sussex from 1934 to 1939.

His first job was as assistant librarian at Lewes Public Library from 1939 to 1947. This included four and a half years war service in the Royal Air Force, mostly in India from 1942. He was demobbed in April 1947 with the rank of corporal.

He became a student and studied at the Brighton School of Librarianship from January to December 1948.

In later life he received a Master of Arts, London University (with mark of distinction), 1971 and in 1977 became a Doctor of Philosophy, London University.

== Librarian career ==
After qualifying, Hunnisett worked as reference librarian for Bath Municipal Libraries from March 1949 to October 1951, then as central lending librarian for Worthing Public Libraries from November 1951 to October 1956. During this time he conducted the Association of Assistant Librarians correspondence courses in classification, 1952.

In October 1956, Hunnisett was appointed deputy borough librarian and curator for Shrewsbury Public Libraries, Museums and Art Gallery, where he worked until August 1964. While there, he was a committee member of Shropshire Arts Society and also gained Part 1 of the Museums Association Diploma in 1963.

Pursuing an interest in steel engraving, he became a lecturer (later senior then principal lecturer) in the Department of Librarianship at Brighton Polytechnic from September 1964 to August 1988.

After retiring, Hunnisett was frequently invited as a guest lecturer at bibliography events such as the Ninth Annual Seminar of the British Book Trade Index at the University of Reading in 1991.

=== Additional posts ===
Hunnisett was the honorary training officer and chairman of Surrey and Sussex Libraries in Co-operation (SASLIC) from 1977 to 1982, a member of the National Committee on Library History, and a member of the Art Libraries Society (ARLIS) from 1970 to 1980.

== Writing ==
=== Books ===
As there was no suitable book on steel engraving to use for teaching and reference, Hunnisett set out to write one, visiting and corresponding with many libraries and collections. He ultimately wrote three books:

- Steel Engraved Book Illustration in England (1980). Scolar Press. 263 pp ISBN 0-85967-5386 (Reprinted 2022 Routledge Revivals series ISBN 9780367548568)
- A Dictionary of British Steel Engravers (1980). F. Lewis. (2nd edition revised and enlarged, published January 1989 by Scolar Press. ISBN 0-85967-740-0) (Reprinted 2022 Routledge Revivals series ISBN 9780367548346)
- Engraved on Steel - History of Picture Production Using Steel Plates (1998) Ashgate. ISBN 9780859679718 (Reprinted 2020 Routledge Revivals series ISBN 9781138311411)

The working papers for these books and drafts for a fourth book were donated to the St Bride Print History Library after his death and the original prints of the books are in their collection.

A review of his first book by Christina Huemer noted: "The history of steel engraving, however, has hitherto been confined to a page or two in surveys of book illustration or Victorian art history, not easily accessible to interested collectors or librarians. Therefore Basil Hunnisett’s book, the first systematic treatment of the subject, is most welcome." Michel Melot, in the Bulletin des Bibliothèques de France said: "The author fills an important gap in the history of engraving and illustrated books, its index makes it an easy tool for book historians." George Tubbs (Art Libraries Society of North America) said: "The volume could equally well be added to a special collection on the history of books and printing, or to a general research collection, since a case could be made that the book elucidates social, as well as book and art history. The art librarian would do well to assure this book’s presence in one location or another." Poul Steen Larsen (Royal School of Librarianship, Denmark) said: "Dr Hunnisett should receive due praise for this scholarly treatment of a neglected chapter in the history of British book illustration. This pioneer work is a must in all art book collections and larger general libraries".

=== Articles ===
- "Charles Warren, Engraver," Journal of the Royal Society of Arts. Vol. 125, No. 5253 (August 1977), pp. 590–594.
- "The History of Fine Art Libraries in France" - Thesis submitted for MA in Library and Information Studies, University College, London, 1971 (reproduced in Bibliothek und Wissenschaft, Vol 17, 1983 149pp).
- A serial of six articles in Antiquarian Book Monthly Review on aspects of steel engraving 1986-1988 held by the British Library
- April 1986, "Alaric Watts and the Literary Souvenir", Antiquarian Book Monthly Review, Vol 13, ISSN 0306-7475, pp. 132–135.
- Hunnisett wrote 14 articles for the New Dictionary of National Biography 1998-9 and revised four further articles; all were about 18th and 19th century engravers.
- Seven contributions to the Grove Dictionary of Art 1991.
- Contributions to Library History, New Library World, Art Libraries Journal and Journal of the Royal Society of Arts

== Legacy ==
Over 100 books and articles cite Hunnisett's books and articles. They are frequently cited in bibliographies and sources by curators in museums and art galleries to support exhibits. Academic institutions and art organisations suggest the books as recommended reading, providing background support for courses in literature, historical biography and bibliography.

== Honours, awards and distinctions ==
- Associate of Library Association in 1949
- Fellow of the Library Association, 1951
- Fellow of the Royal Society of Arts 1975-85
