= Luraine Tansey =

American slide librarian

Luraine Tansey (née Collins) (January 29, 1918 – June 18, 2014) was an American slide librarian who created the first Universal Slide Classification System in 1969 with Wendell Simons.

Tansey worked to develop a "universal" slide classification scheme that would serve the needs of both catalogers and patrons. Co-authored by Wendell Simons, it was published in 1969 under the title, A slide classification system for the organization and automatic indexing of interdisciplinary collections of slides and pictures. Created mostly during her tenure at the University of California, Santa Cruz in the late 1960s-early 1970s, this system is still in use at UCSC and other institutions and is known as the Tansey or Santa Cruz system. This system was also built with computer indexing in mind.

Tansey worked with the College Art Association (CAA) for the benefit of librarians and image librarians. Her work contributed to the eventual founding of two professional societies, the Art Libraries Society of North America (ARLIS/NA) and the Visual Resources Association (VRA). In 1993 she received both the VRA and ARLIS/NA's Distinguished Service Awards. In 1993, Tansey underwrote the VRA Travel Awards Program; several Luraine Tansey Travel Awards are still awarded each year.

Luraine Tansey worked on several lectures and publications throughout the 1970s. Her work “Potential Uses of Slide Classification Data Bases in Art History,” was in 1st international Conference of Art History Volume II in Pisa, Italy in 1978. “Classification of Research Photographs and Slides,” was published in Library Trends, January 1975. Slide Collection Index Application was published in International Business Machines, 1973.

She also assisted her husband, Dr. Richard Tansey, with editing five editions of Gardner's Art Through the Ages as a bibliographer, and she worked on the index in Cohen's Study Guide for Art through the Ages.

Tansey was born in Manhattan, Kansas. Tansey had four sons, one of whom is Mark Tansey. She died June 18, 2014, in Bristol, Rhode Island.
