= LIDO =

XML schema for describing museum or collection objects

Lightweight Information Describing Objects (LIDO) is an XML schema for describing museum or collection objects. Memory institutions use LIDO for “exposing, sharing and connecting data on the web”. It can be applied to all kind of disciplines in cultural heritage, e.g. art, natural history, technology, etc. LIDO is a specific application of CIDOC CRM.

== Background ==
Digital descriptions of pieces of cultural heritage consist of several parts. These encompass at least textual cataloging information as well as one or more digital surrogates, e.g. a photograph or a 3D scan. Access to this information is effected by the means of metadata records, which provide not only information about the object described (e.g. a painting’s title or the date of its creation) but also contain information about the data record itself (e.g. by whom it has been created and when).

LIDO provides an XML based schema for these types of information and serves as common ground for sharing metadata. It enables web portals to integrate information from different organizations (like museums or collections) in a standardized format. Hereby it simplifies the dissemination of data. LIDO is used e.g. by the German Digital Library, Europeana and the Yale Center for British Art at Yale University.

== History ==
Organizations creating digital records oftentimes use their own formats for storing information in their collections. This makes sharing their data difficult: Websites like Europeana that combine information from different sources and provide them on a single platform face the challenge of integrating heterogeneous data formats. The web portal owner has to write a crosswalk for each external metadata format which is both costly and time-consuming. As a result, data might not get the exposure it could since the web portal might not have the resources to create and maintain the crosswalks.

To avoid this situation international experts developed LIDO as a harvesting standard. It roots in CDWA Lite by the J. Paul Getty Trust, museumdat by the German Museums Association, and SPECTRUM XML Schema by the UK Collections Trust. It is a specific application of CIDOC CRM. While work on LIDO started in 2008, its first version has been released during the ICOM/CIDOC conference in Shanghai in 2010. LIDO is continuously refined by cultural heritage experts.

== Principles ==
As an XML Schema LIDO is strictly hierarchical. It summarizes each chunk of information about an object in a set encapsulated by a wrapper element, e.g.:

<lido:titleWrap>
    <lido:titleSet>
        <lido:appellationValue>Chickens and Ducks</lido:appellationValue>
    </lido:titleSet>
</lido:titleWrap>

LIDO provides descriptive as well as administrative information about an object. The descriptive part includes (among others):

- classificatory information (sort of object, genre, shape, ...)
- identificatory information (name, inscriptions, measurements, description of the object, ...)
- events in the object’s history (creation, production, restoration, acquisition, loss, persons/places/objects involved in the event, …)
- connection to other entities (concepts, persons/places/objects involved, …)

The administrative part provides (again, among others) details about:

- rights associated with the object
- information about the record itself (ID, format, provenance, license…)
- information about the digital resource (link to the record, linked pages, …)

LIDO also differentiates between information users see on a website (display information) and information used for searching and retrieval (indexing information).

A core concept of LIDO is modelling an object’s history according to the events in which it was involved. This concept has its source in CIDOC CRM and provides an opportunity to gain new insights about the object or persons involved:

"This event-centric approach [of CIDOC CRM] makes it possible to map the properties of an object with references to the actors involved, to location, and time more precisely. Thus, it supports the (automatic) uncovering of correlations between originally scattered information and it contributes to the contextualization of objects.”

LIDO also provides the possibility to connect data with authority files. This essentially facilitates a subsequent publication as Linked Data, thereby contributing to the Semantic Web.

== LIDO terminology ==
The LIDO Terminology is a complement to the current LIDO v1.0 specification. Its main purpose it to define controlled vocabularies for certain LIDO elements and attributes which are made referenceable through a URI. Thereby the LIDO Terminology is committed to Linked Open Data and increases the interoperability of LIDO records.

== Relationship to CIDOC CRM ==
CIDOC CRM is an object-oriented and extensible ontology. It defines concepts and relationships that are necessary for the description of cultural heritage objects. Being an ontology, CIDOC CRM is based on formal logic and graph oriented.

LIDO, on the other hand, is a specific XML based application of CIDOC CRM. It has been developed for harvesting metadata. Other than CIDOC CRM LIDO is a schema and thereby strictly hierarchic. It adopts aspects of its predecessor, CDWA, but heavily relies on CIDOC CRM's classes, e.g. E5 Event, E39 Actor, E55 Type.

== LIDO tools ==
A few tools are available for handling LIDO:

- OAICatMuseum by OCLC Research allows publication of museum data as LIDO or CDWA, using the OAI-PMH protocol
- MINT is a general tool for metadata mapping developed by National Technical University of Athens that is often used by Europeana-related projects. It can map to EDM or LIDO
- LIBIS has created a LIDO profile for the CollectiveAccess open source Collection Management System. This allows museums to catalog objects directly in LIDO. While LIDO is not a fully-fledged museum Collection Management schema (e.g. like SPECTRUM by the Collections Trust), it is quite sufficient for most collections.
