= Union List of Artist Names =

American database of artists and people

Sample entry, for Mark Rothko, screen 1

Sample ULAN Record, Mark Rothko continued.

The Union List of Artist Names (ULAN) is a free online database of the Getty Research Institute using a controlled vocabulary, which by 2018 contained over 300,000 artists and over 720,000 names for them, as well as other information about artists. Names in ULAN may include given names, pseudonyms, variant spellings, names in multiple languages, and names that have changed over time (e.g., married names). Among these names, one is flagged as the preferred name.

Although it is displayed as a list, ULAN is structured as a thesaurus, compliant with ISO and NISO standards for thesaurus construction; it contains hierarchical, equivalence, and associative relationships.

The focus of each ULAN record is an artist. In the database, each artist record (also called a subject) is identified by a unique numeric ID. The artist's nationality is given, as are places and dates of birth and death (if known). Linked to each artist record are names, related artists, sources for the data, and notes. The temporal coverage of the ULAN ranges from Antiquity to the present and the scope is global.

Artists may be either individuals (persons) or groups of individuals working together (corporate bodies). Artists in the ULAN generally represent creators involved in the conception or production of visual arts and architecture. Some performance artists are included (but typically not actors, dancers, or other performing artists). Repositories and some donors are included as well.

== History ==
Development of the ULAN began in 1984 by the J. Paul Getty Trust. The Trust, which already managed the Art and Architecture Thesaurus (AAT), began the project in response to requests from Getty projects for controlled vocabularies of artists' names. The ULAN grows and changes via contributions from the user community and editorial work of the Getty Vocabulary Program.

Although originally intended only for use by Getty projects, the broader art information community outside the Getty expressed a need to use ULAN for cataloging and retrieval. The Getty thus distributed ULAN for broader use according to the tenets previously established for the construction and maintenance of the Art and Architecture Thesaurus: Its scope includes names needed to catalog and retrieve information about the visual arts and architecture; it is based on terminology that is current, warranted for use by authoritative literary sources, and validated by use in the scholarly art and architectural history community; and it is compiled and edited in response to the needs of the user community. Originally constructed as a simple alphabetized "union list" of clustered artist names and biographies, in order to make it consistent with the AAT and Getty Thesaurus of Geographic Names, in the late 1990s ULAN was brought into compliance with national and international standards for thesaurus construction. Its scope was broadened to include corporate bodies such as architectural firms and repositories of art, which may have hierarchical levels.

The ULAN was founded under the management of Eleanor Fink (head of what was then called the Vocabulary Coordination Group, and later Director of the Art History Information Program, later called the Getty Information Institute). The ULAN has been constructed over the years by numerous members of the user community and an army of dedicated editors, under the supervision of several managers. The ULAN was published in 1994 in hardcopy (Union List of Artist Names. Project manager, James M. Bower; senior editor, Murtha Baca. New York: G.K. Hall, 1994) and machine-readable files. Given the growing size and frequency of changes and additions to the ULAN, by 1997 it had become evident that hard-copy publication was impractical. It is now published in automated formats only, in both a searchable online Web interface and in data files available for licensing. The data for ULAN is compiled and edited in an editorial system that was custom-built by Getty technical staff to meet the unique requirements of compiling data from many contributors, merging, moving, and publishing in various formats. Final editorial control of the ULAN is maintained by the Getty Vocabulary Program, using well-established editorial rules. The current managers of the ULAN are Patricia Harpring, Managing Editor, and Murtha Baca, Head, Vocabulary Program and Digital Resource Management.

== Highlighting ==
Even though the structure is relatively flat, the ULAN is constructed as a hierarchical database; its trees branch from a root called Top of the ULAN hierarchies (Subject_ID: 500000001); it currently has two published facets: Person and Corporate Body. Entities in the Person facet typically have no children. Entities in the Corporate Body facet may branch into trees. There may be multiple broader contexts, making the ULAN structure polyhierarchical. In addition to the hierarchical relationships, the ULAN also has equivalent and associative relationships.

== See also ==
- Benezit Dictionary of Artists the main competitor, now online via Oxford Art Online
- Art and Architecture Thesaurus (AAT)
- Categories for the Description of Works of Art (CDWA)
- Cultural Objects Name Authority (CONA)
- Getty Thesaurus of Geographic Names (TGN)
- Getty Vocabulary Program
