= May Brawley Hill =

American art historian

May Brawley Hill is an American art historian.

Her book Grandmother's Garden, received a Special mention at the 17th George Wittenborn Memorial Book Awards in 1996.

== Books ==
- On Foreign Soil: American Gardeners Abroad (2005)
- Furnishing the Old-Fashioned Garden: Three Centuries of American Summerhouses, Dovecotes, Pergolas, Privies, Fences & Birdhouses (1998)
- Grandmother's Garden: The Old-Fashioned American Garden 1865-1915 (1995)
- Grez days: Robert Vonnoh in France (1987)
- American Impressionists in the Garden (2010)
