= Slide library =

Library with collection of photographic slides

A typical slide library. Library Bureau cabinets in front, former card catalogs retrofitted to hold 35mm slides to the left, and Neumade metal cabinets in the rear.

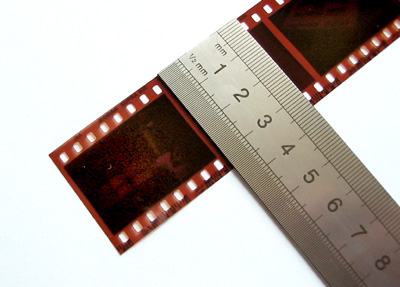
Unmounted 35mm color print film, the same size as 35mm slide film, with a metric ruler for scale.

A slide library is a library that houses a collection of photographic slides, either as part of a larger library or image archive, or standing alone within a larger organization, such as an academic department of a college or university, a museum, or a corporation. Typically, a "slide library" contains slides depicting artwork, architecture, or cultural objects, and is typically used for the study, teaching, and documentation of art history, architectural history, and visual culture. Other academic disciplines, such as biology and other sciences, also maintain image collections akin to slide libraries. Corporations may also have image libraries to maintain and document their publications and history. Increasingly, these types of libraries are known as "Visual Resources Collections," as they may be responsible for all "visual" materials for the study of a subject and include still and moving images in a variety of physical and virtual formats. They may contain:

- 35mm slides
- lantern slides
- mounted study photographs
- born digital images
- 35mm, 8mm film

Many educational institutions have changed the names of their slide libraries over the years, to a variety of titles like Visual Resources Center, Imaging & AV Center, Digital Collections Center, etc. The titles and duties of slide librarians have therefore expanded greatly. As keepers of these important historical images, visual resources librarians have continuously cataloged and inventoried slide collections, circulated them to faculty for teaching, and more recently, digitized slides and placed them online via content management systems.

== History of visual resources collections ==
The first American lantern slide collections, developed by museums to reflect and augment their collections, got their start between 1860 and 1879: the American Natural History Museum, the New York State Military Museum, the Smithsonian Institution, and the Winterthur Museum. American colleges and universities began their collections during the same period of time: DePauw University, Columbia University, Oberlin College, Princeton University, University of Rochester. Colleges and university collections were used primarily for classroom instruction.

The first illustrated architectural history course west of the Mississippi was John Galen Howard's Architecture 5A-F at the University of California, Berkeley in 1905. The six-semester course was required for all architecture students, and like other architectural history courses of its time, at MIT and Cornell University at least, were multi-year in duration. Of course, the lecture was illustrated by lantern slides. In the U.S., lantern slides generally measured 3"x 4.25".

The 1950s was a period of transition from black and white lantern slides, which heretofore had often been hand colored, to color positive film. Lantern slides were shot directly onto color film, and the 35mm slide (2"x2" with an image of 24mm x 36mm) gained in popularity.

The heyday of the lantern slide lasted one hundred years, more or less, from 1860 to 1960. The reign of the 35mm slide, more or less, was about half as long, fifty years, 1955–2005.

== Timeline: Development of visual resources (collections and profession) in the U.S. ==
1865. First lantern slide collections begin developing in the U.S. These 3.25" x 4.0" glass slides projected clearly with great detail. However, projectors required lime light which was dirty and dangerous

1887. First transparent, flexible nitrocellulose film base developed

1888. First perforated film stock developed

1889. Eastman combined nitrocellulose film stock, perforated edges, and dry-gelatino-bromide emulsion to create the first paperless film stock

1902. Court denies Eastman's exclusive patent, allowing any company to develop 35mm film

1905. UC Berkeley's Architecture Library acquires its first lantern slide, the tree of architecture, made from Banister Fletcher's book, A History of Architecture on the Comparative Method

1909. 35mm adopted as the international standard gauge by Motion Picture Patents Company, an Edison trust

1913. 35mm film format introduced into still photography

1925. Leica Camera introduced, using 35mm still film

1930. Safety film introduced (cellulose diacetate)

1934–1936. Kodachrome 35mm slide film introduced, but not widely adopted by colleges and universities. Film stock was either flammable or brittle

1949. Kodak replaces all nitrate-based films with its safety film, a cellulose-triacetate base

1952. All camera film is now triacetate based, paving the way for widespread adoption of 35mm film in both amateur and academic markets

1952+ American faculty widely divided in their allegiances to lantern slides for their clarity or to 35mm slides for their ease of production and transport to class. Huge debates begin about whether 35mm color film is stable enough for adoption and whether the loss of clarity will ruin the teaching of art history. Younger faculty adopt 35mm film, while older faculty prefer lantern slides

1968. Visual resources curators begin meeting during annual College Art Association (CAA) conferences

1969. Art Libraries Society, established in the United Kingdom and Ireland, founded

1969. The first "universal" classification system published by Luraine Tansey and Wendell Simons under the title, A slide classification system for the organization and automatic indexing of interdisciplinary collections of slides and pictures

1972. Art Libraries Society of North America (ARLIS/NA) founded by a group of art librarians attending the American Library Association annual conference in Chicago

1972. Nancy DeLaurier organizes the visual resources curators of Mid-America College Art Association

1974. Slide libraries; a guide for academic institutions and museums, by Betty Jo Irvine. Published by Libraries Unlimited for Art Libraries Society

1974. Mid-America College Art Association slides and photographs newsletter begins publishing under the leadership of Nancy DeLaurier

1974. Slide buyer's guide, revised edition, edited by Nancy DeLaurier, published by University of Missouri-Kansas City, "for The College Art Association of America". Limited to 500 copies

1976. Slide buyer's guide, 3rd edition, edited by Nancy DeLaurier, published by the College Art Association

1978. Guide for Photograph Collections, edited by Nancy Schuller and Susan Tamulonis, published by MACAA/VR

1978. Guide to Equipment for Slide Maintenance and Viewing, edited by Gillian Scott, published by MACAA/VR

1979. Slide libraries : a guide for academic institutions, museums, and special collections, by Betty Jo Irvine with assistance from P. Eileen Fry. Libraries Unlimited

1979. Guide for the Management of Visual Resources Collections, edited by Nancy Schuller and published by MACAA/VR (Mid-America College Art Association Visual Resources Committee)

1980. Guide to Copy Photography for Visual Resource Collections, edited by Rosemary Kuehn and Arlene Zelda Richardson, published by MACAA/VR

1980. Standard for staffing fine arts slide collections, by the Ad-hoc Committee on Professional Standards for Visual Resources Collections

1980. Slide buyer's guide, 4th edition, edited by Nancy DeLaurier, published by Mid-America College Art Association, Visual Resources Committee

1980. MACAA slides and photographs newsletter reborn as the International Bulletin for Photograph Documentation of the Visual Arts

1980. Visual Resources: an international journal of documentation launched by Helene Roberts, published by Iconographic Publications

1980. Art and Architecture Thesaurus project launched to provide subject access for art and architecture

1982–1983. Visual Resources curators from MACAA/VR, CAA, and ARLIS/NA launch Visual Resources Association (VRA)

1983. Standards for art libraries and fine arts slide collections, published as Occasional Paper No. 2 of ARLIS/NA

1985. Slide buyers' guide : an international directory of slide sources for art and architecture, 5th edition, edited by Norine Duncan Cashman, index by Mark Braunstein, published by Libraries Unlimited as part of their Visual resources series

1986. Sara Shatford Layne publishes "Analyzing the Subject of a Picture: A Theoretical Approach"in Cataloging and Classification Quarterly, vol. 6(3)

1987. Toni Petersen, President of ARLIS/NA, urges the Visual Resources Division, to begin developing some standard authorities for shared cataloging

1988. Barneyscan, first dedicated 35mm slide scanner, introduced

1989. Visual Resources Association launches its bulletin

1990. Art and Architecture Thesaurus, Toni Petersen, editor, published by Oxford University Press in 3 volumes. Critical step in providing subject access to individual 35mm slides in visual resources collections

1990. Slide buyers' guide : an international directory of slide sources for art and architecture, 6th edition edited by Norine Duncan Cashman, published by Libraries Unlimited, Visual resources series. At head of title: Visual Resources Association

1990. Beyond the Book: Extending MARC for Subject Access, edited by Toni Petersen and Pat Molholt, by G.K. Hall. Several papers on visual resources, including : "Access to Diverse Collections in University Settings: the Berkeley Dilemma", by Howard Besser and Maryly Snow, and "Visual Depictions and the Use of MARC: A View from the Trenches of Slide Librarianship", by Maryly Snow

1990. Tim Berners-Lee starts work on a hypertext graphical-user-interface (GUI) and makes up the name World Wide Web as the name for the program

1991. Facilities Standards for Art Libraries and Visual Resources Collections, edited by Betty Jo Irvine. Published by Libraries Unlimited for ARLIS/NA

1991. World Architecture Index: a Guide to Illustrations, compiled by Edward H. Teague, published by Greenwood Press as part of its Art Reference Collection No. 12

1991. Visual Resources Association creates its listserv, VRA-L, a vital communication tool for its visual resources curators members

1992. Users' Guide to The Art and Architecture Thesaurus, published along with the electronic edition by Oxford University Press

1993. Visual Resources Association established its Data Standards Committee

1994. March. Marc Andreessen leaves National Center for Supercomputing Applications (NCSA) to found the Mosaic Communications Corp, later becomes Netscape. Mosaic launches the World Wide Web for the general public

1994. September. First image database, SPIRO, debuts on the World Wide Web.

1995. Concordance of Ancient Site Names, edited by Eileen Fry and Maryly Snow, published as Topical Paper No. 2 of ARLIS/NA (see 1987 call for visual resources authority work). This is one of the first scholarly authorities created by visual resources curators for visual resources cataloging

1995. Criteria for the Hiring and Retention of Visual Resources Professionals adopted by the executive boards of both ARLIS/NA and VRA

1996. Art and Architecture Thesaurus Sourcebook, edited by Toni Petersen, published as Occasional Paper No. 10 of ARLIS/NA

1996. Staffing Standards for Art Libraries and Visual Resources Coillections, published as Occasional Paper No. 11 of ARLIS/NA

1996. VRA Core 1.0 released

1998. Vision Project, sponsored by Research Libraries Group. First shared cataloging project with 32 visual resources collections cataloging and sharing images. Vision Project also served as a test of VRA Core 1.0

1998. VRA Core 2.0 released

1998. ArtMARC Sourcebook: Cataloging Art, Architecture, and Their Visual Images, edited by Linda McRae and Lynda White, published by American Library Association

2000. Guidelines for the Visual Resources Profession, edited by Kim Kopatz. A joint publication of ARLIS/NA and VRA

2000. Collection Development Policies for Libraries and Visual Collections in the Arts, compiled by Ann Baird Whiteside, Pamela Born, Adeane Alpert Bregman, published as Occasional Paper No. 12 of ARLIS/NA

2001. VRA Copy Photography Computator (for determining intellectual property restrictions and fair use) released

2002. VRA Core 3.0 released

2002. Criteria for the Hiring and Retention of Visual Resources Professionals updated, and adopted by ARLIS/NA, VRA, and College Art Association

2004. ARTstor image database, a project of the Andrew Mellon Foundation, is available for licensing. ARTstor combines finding, organizing, and presenting images in one integrated software environment

2004. Kodak discontinues manufacturing its 35mm carousel projectors and carousels. This sends a strong signal to American professors that the time to switch from 35mm slides to digital images is now

2004. North American Lantern Slide Survey begun, jointly sponsored by ARLIS/NA and VRA

2005. VRA Core 4.0 Beta released

2006. Cataloging Cultural Objects published by American Library Association. Edited by Murtha Baca, Patricia Harpring, Elisa Lanzi, Linda McRae, Ann Baird Whiteside on behalf of the Visual Resources Association

2007. VRA Core 4.0 released
