= Crosswalk (disambiguation) =

A crosswalk, or pedestrian crossing, is a place designated for pedestrians to cross a road.

Crosswalk may also refer to:

- Crosswalk.com, a Christian website
- Schema crosswalk, in databases, a table that shows equivalent elements in more than one schema
- Crosswalk, in database management, a type of table that maps together multiple associate entities
- Crosswalk, a division of the Bleecker Street film distributor focused on event-driven theatrical releases
- The Crosswalk, a band that included Cody Chesnutt
