= CatalogIt =

Cloud-based software

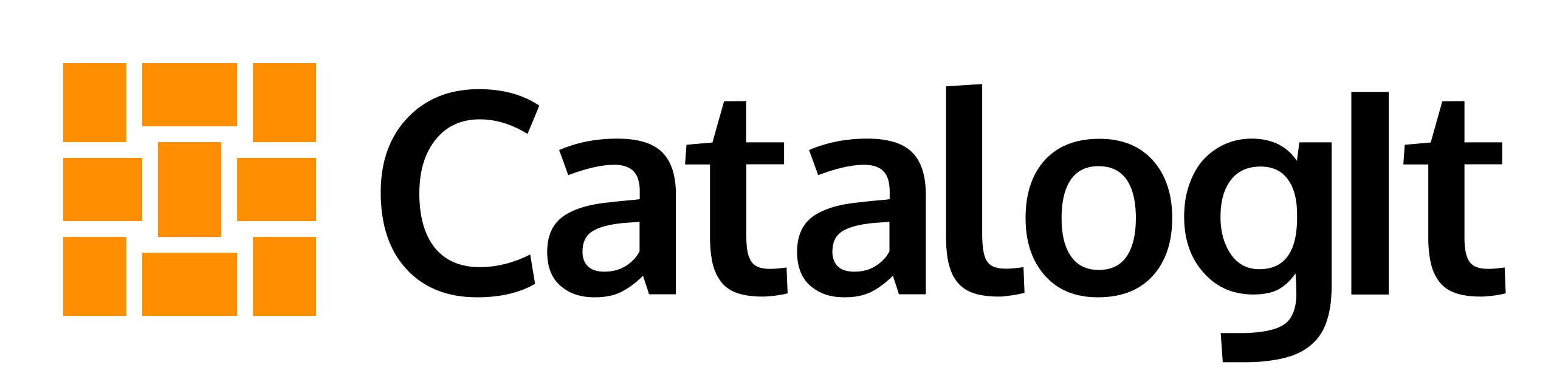
- Industry: SaaS; Museums
- Founded: 2015
- Founders: Howard Burrows; Dan Rael
- Headquarters: Ann Arbor, Michigan, United States
- Services: Collections management system; Digital preservation; Digital asset management
- Website: www.catalogit.app

CatalogIt is a cloud-based software used for managing and sharing collections. Established in 2015 as a collections management system, CatalogIt was designed for museums, organizations, and repositories as a curation and digital preservation tool.

CatalogIt offers users the ability to document, preserve, manage, and share their collections virtually. CatalogIt accounts start free with optional packages available for additional records, users, and storage. Users of CatalogIt have the added ability to record details about their items and link them to each other, creating digital collections as they go.

== History ==
CatalogIt was established in 2015 by Dan Rael and Howard Burrows to document Rael's personal collection of Native American artifacts. Rael needed a system to document the artifacts so Burrows created a cloud-based, mobile app to serve Rael's needs, having found no other system for documenting ethnographic collections.

In 2016, CatalogIt facilitated a release of the software to a limited, invite-only group within the private collector community. Exposure and review of the software in 2017 attracted the attention of Joy Tahan Ruddell, a museum registrar. Recognizing its potential utility for museum collections management, Ruddell joined Rael and Burrows to further improve the software.

As a result of their collaboration, CatalogIt has expanded its reach beyond individual collectors, and has been adopted by museums and organizations globally, including the Berkeley Historical Society, the National Black Doll Museum of History & Culture, Fort Adams Trust, Kinsman Free Public Library, St. Joseph Museums, and the Basque Museum and Cultural Center.

== Platform ==
CatalogIt's users are predominantly museums, historical societies, and other cultural and historical organizations. The software enables the cataloging of a range of items, including artwork, letters, and various forms of three-dimensional objects. A built-in classification system prompts users to provide details about their uploaded items, such as the type and origin of photographs.

CatalogIt supports QR code look-up and process management. CatalogIt also provides an option to the user to either maintain private databases or share their collections on the public CatalogIt HUB.

== CatalogIt HUB ==
The CatalogIt HUB is CatalogIt's native publishing platform used to make selected portions of digital collections publicly accessible online. It allows museums, organizations, and individuals to publish their digital collections, and aggregates metadata and images which enables cross-collection discovery and self-directed research. It serves as a centralized resource for the public to browse cultural, historical, and artistic materials.
