= Miguel Canals =

Spanish painter and copyist (1925–1995)

- Born: 1925; Barcelona, Spain
- Died: 1995 (aged 69–70); Barcelona, Spain
- Known for: Painting and art reproduction

Miguel Canals (1925–1995) was a Spanish painter and copyist associated with Barcelona. He was the founder and leading figure of the Estudio Canals (Canals Studio), a Barcelona-based workshop known for producing reproductions and reinterpretations of paintings by earlier European artists. His work included still lifes as well as copies after Old Masters and modern European painters.

== Life and career ==
Canals was born in Barcelona in 1925 and died in 1995. Little documented information about his formal artistic education is available in major art-reference databases. Getty's Union List of Artist Names identifies him as a Spanish painter and artist and records sources from the Rijksbureau voor Kunsthistorische Documentatie (RKD) and the Witt Library.

Canals became known for paintings in the tradition of European still-life painting. His works include compositions of fruit, flowers and birds, frequently incorporating elaborate decorative frames. Paintings attributed to Canals and his studio have continued to appear in European and international art auctions.

== Estudio Canals ==
In the 1970s, Canals established Estudio Canals in Barcelona. The workshop employed several painters and produced reproductions and adaptations of works from different periods of European art. Contemporary and later auction catalogues identify the studio with copies after artists including Eugène Boudin, Edgar Degas, Pierre-Auguste Renoir, Amedeo Modigliani, Claude Monet and other European painters.

A 1995 article in ''The Independent'' described the Canals studio as a Barcelona workshop whose reproductions of Old Master paintings had become collectible in their own right. The article distinguished such authorized reproductions from fraudulent copies that were presented as originals. It reported that works from the Canals studio were sold with certificates of origin and identified by a studio mark on the reverse.

The following year, The Independent reported on a Bonhams auction of works from the Canals studio, including reproductions after Gustave Caillebotte, Edgar Degas, Édouard Manet and Edvard Munch. The article described the workshop as producing copies of works by Old Masters and modern European artists and noted that the Canals family continued the studio after Miguel Canals's death.

The distinction between reproduction and forgery has nevertheless been treated differently by art-reference sources. Getty's Union List of Artist Names records Canals as both a painter and a counterfeiter, with the latter designation attributed to the RKD. Contemporary reporting on the Canals studio, however, emphasized that its commercial reproductions were identified as copies rather than represented as originals.

== Works and style ==
Canals is particularly associated with still-life compositions containing fruit, flowers and birds. Works attributed directly to Canals are distinguished in auction records from works described as being from the Studio of Miguel Canals.

Examples of works attributed to Canals or his studio have included still lifes with cherries and birds, baskets of fruit, and compositions featuring birds and foliage. The studio also produced copies after earlier paintings. Auction catalogues commonly identify such works with a STUDIO M. CANALS stamp on the reverse or stretcher.

A 2026 auction description by Setdart characterized Estudio Canals as a small group of painters formed in Barcelona in the 1970s whose work drew on classical painting traditions. It described Canals as the group's most prominent painter and noted the workshop's use of techniques and visual references associated with Renaissance, Baroque and Impressionist painting.

== Art market and legacy ==
Works by Canals and the Canals studio have remained present in the European art market after his death. Auction records include sales of paintings attributed to Canals as well as works identified as products of his studio. In 2024, for example, a still life by Canals was offered by Alcalá Subastas, while works from the Canals studio have appeared at auction houses including Christie's, Bonhams, Roseberys and Sworders.

The continued appearance of Canals's paintings and studio works in auction catalogues has contributed to his documentation in art-market databases. The Getty Union List of Artist Names records his dates and nationality and links his identity to records maintained by the RKD and the Witt Library.
