= Action Painting II =

1984 painting by Mark Tansey

Action Painting II is a 1984 painting by Mark Tansey, now in the Jean-Noël Desmarais pavilion, the contemporary art section of the Montreal Museum of Fine Arts, to which it was donated by Nahum Gelber.

It was produced using a canvas prepared with gesso, before being painted in grisaille.

== Sources ==
- Analyse, voir § b : Mark Tansey : L'association de la technique du gesso et des images d'archive à la photographie
