= Mark Tansey =

American painter (born 1949)

- Born: 1949 (age 76–77); San Jose, California
- Known for: Painting, modeling, smelting

Mark Tansey (born 1949) is an American painter.

== Early life and education ==
Mark Tansey was born in San Jose, California to Richard G. Tansey, an art historian, and Luraine Tansey, a slide librarian who invented one of the first computerized slide archives. Raised in an artistic family, Tansey had an early introduction to art. He attended Saturday art classes at the San Francisco Art Institute in his early teen years and made a habit of regularly visiting art museums in the area. Beginning in 1969, Tansey spent three years studying at the ArtCenter College of Design in Los Angeles. After graduating, Tansey worked as an assistant at the San Jose State University Gallery. There he became well acquainted with the art that would later influence much of his work. He moved to New York in 1974 and attended Hunter College in New York for their graduate studio art program. There, Tansey continued his examination of the historic art introduced to him by his parents, as well as modern painting and sculpture techniques and artists. Tansey also worked briefly as Helen Frankenthaler's assistant.

== Process ==
In 1980, Tansey began developing his signature monochromatic, photo-inspired style. His first finished work in this signature style, "A Short History of Modernist Painting,'' was acquired by prestigious art museums like the Metropolitan Museum of Art only four years after its completion. Tansey's art begins as he collages different source images together, sometimes warping and distorting them in the process. He derives his inspiration from photographic reproductions and magazine clippings, and works in stages of small sketches and drawings until he is prepared for the final painting. His method involves various techniques of laying down monochromatic paint onto a canvas covered in gesso. He blocks out the general forms of the piece and then carefully removes varying layers of paint to form the final product. Due to the fast-drying properties of gesso, Tansey only has about a six-hour window in which to complete his alterations to a composition. As such, he works in a style similar to fresco painters, painting in segments that he can finish in this short time frame. Tansey has been praised for the "near-photographic precision" of his paintings.

== Notable works ==
Tansey's paintings normally depict everyday or historical occurrences, though they typically reveal certain oddities under closer scrutinization. He argues that representation has other functions rather than "capturing the real." He argues that his work is about "how different realities interact with each other."

One of Tansey's most potent pieces from his early period is The Last Judgement (1971), which he created from oil on masonite. He was inspired by Michelangelo's fresco in the Sistine Chapel and proceeded to reproduce it in 32 rectangular sections. These were placed on display, arranged four across and eight tall. The entire study was done in shades of grey and brown. For Tansey, this project was "a synthesis of photographic, illustrative, and painterly qualities… The meaning of the work resided in the process of re-translation- reinterpretation reproduction- rather than in its perceptual equivalence to reality." In producing this piece, Tansey "discovered the notion of the 'unlimited brush'- any object able to carry paint could function as a brush… touch was equivalent to light… scraping off the paint let the white ground show through." This technique becomes the basis for many of his later paintings. In this stepwise process, the overwhelming and complex fresco that Tansey saw in the Sistine Chapel was broken down into a methodological and grid-like cacophony of figures.

At first glance, Tansey's distinctive paintings appear to depict straight narrative scenes but closer scrutiny reveals an undercurrent of quirks and visual puns. By thus manipulating the conventions and structures of figurative painting, he creates corollaries for literary, philosophical, and historical concepts in visual allegories about the nature and implications of perception, meaning, and interpretation in art.

His work is in major collections including Modern Art Museum in Fort Worth; Walker Art Center in Minneapolis; Broad Art Foundation in Los Angeles; and Smithsonian American Art Museum in Washington D.C. Solo exhibitions include Kunsthalle Museum in Basel (1990); "Mark Tansey: Art and Source", Seattle Art Museum, in Washington (1990, traveled to Montreal Museum of Fine Arts, Canada, St. Louis Art Museum in Missouri, Walker Art Center, List Visual Art Center, MIT in Cambridge, Massachusetts, and Modern Art Museum of Fort Worth in Texas through 1991); Fisher Landau Center for Art in Long Island City, New York (2005) and Museum Kurhaus Kleve, Germany (2005, traveled to Württembergischer Kunstverein in Stuttgart, Germany).

His 1984 painting Action Painting II hangs in the contemporary art section of the Montreal Museum of Fine Arts.

In the 1970s, influenced by the work of René Magritte's eight methods, he began to search for ways of displaying oppositions and contradictions as the motivation for a painting. From this he decided that illustration and representation were fundamentally necessary to heal the rift between art and practice, between symbol and meaning.

The implication is that he as an artist is searching for a "drive" to incorporate in his subjects, that would engage the viewer intellectually, while avoiding simple visual methods and opting for a more subtle and, consequently, more sophisticated and effective approach. Most of his paintings can readily be used as examples of that approach, where at first glance nothing is out of ordinary, but then it becomes apparent that certain elements are out of context, while remaining coherent visually, thus creating the conflict.

== Criticism ==
As much praise as Tansey has received for his art, he has received criticism as well. Tansey successfully broke into the art field in the early 1980s, but due to his consistency in themes, style, and humor, his paintings started receiving more criticism as early as 1990. John Miller, a contributor for Artforum magazine, bemoaned Tansey's unsuccessful attempt to "dumb down" complex issues through the humor in his art. Art critic and former editor of Artforum, David Frankel, said of Tansey in 1997, "I confess that the surfaces of Tansey’s paintings look less convincing to me than they did; their thinness, alternately washy and scratchy, has lost authority through the absence of slathery neo-Expressionism to bounce against." Grace Glueck described an exhibition about Tansey's art-making process as "a display that should occasion many a yawn among viewers."
