= Museums Computer Group =

The Museums Computer Group (MCG) is a British group which provides a forum for discussion between museum, gallery, archive, and higher education professionals who work with computers and new technologies.

== Overview ==
The group meets at different museums throughout the United Kingdom. The organisation is run by a committee with a chair, secretary and treasurer.

The MCG provides a forum for debate and a source of practical help through the possibilities it provides.

== UK Museums on the Web ==
The MCG organises the annual Museums+Tech conference, known until 2016 as the United Kingdom Museums on the Web conference, aimed at museum website managers and those working with web content in museums.

== See also ==
- Collections Trust
- Culture24
- Museum Computer Network, USA
- Museum informatics
