= Museum Data Service =

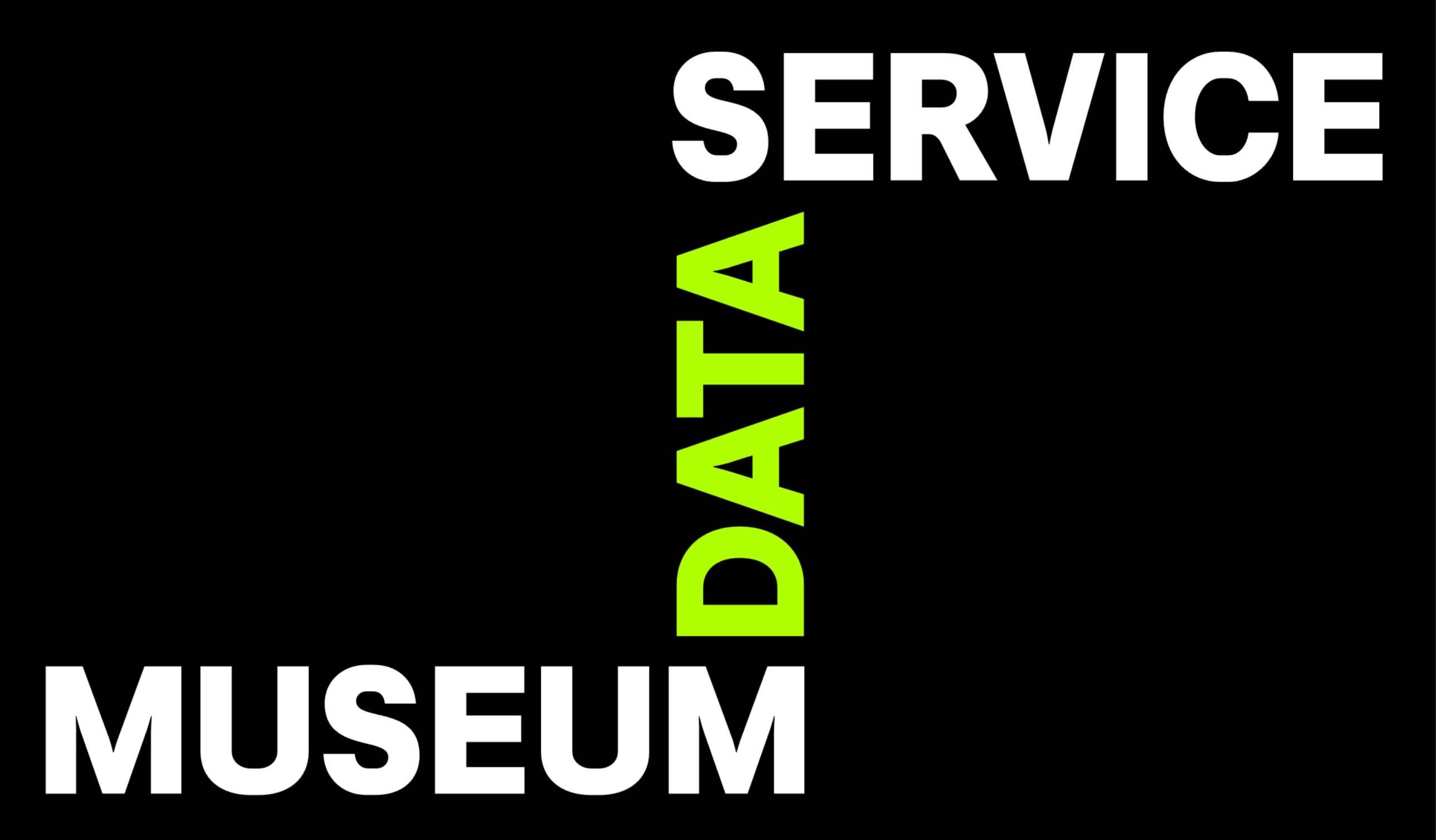
- Area served: United Kingdom
- Website: museumdata.uk
- Advertising: No
- Commercial: No
- Launched: September 2024; 2 years ago
- Current status: Active
- Content license: Varies

The Museum Data Service (MDS) is an initiative to provide an online repository of data about objects in the collections of accredited museums in the United Kingdom and associated territories. It is a collaboration between Art UK, the Collections Trust and the University of Leicester and was launched in September 2024.

The project builds on work done by Art UK since 2003, cataloguing paintings held in public collections. It received initial funding from Bloomberg Philanthropies and the Arts and Humanities Research Council. At launch, the project included 3 million records from 21 museums.

The MDS does not display images of objects, but links instead to museums' own catalogue entries, where available. Each object is assigned a persistent identifier by the MDS.
