= Collections Trust =

British charity

The Collections Trust
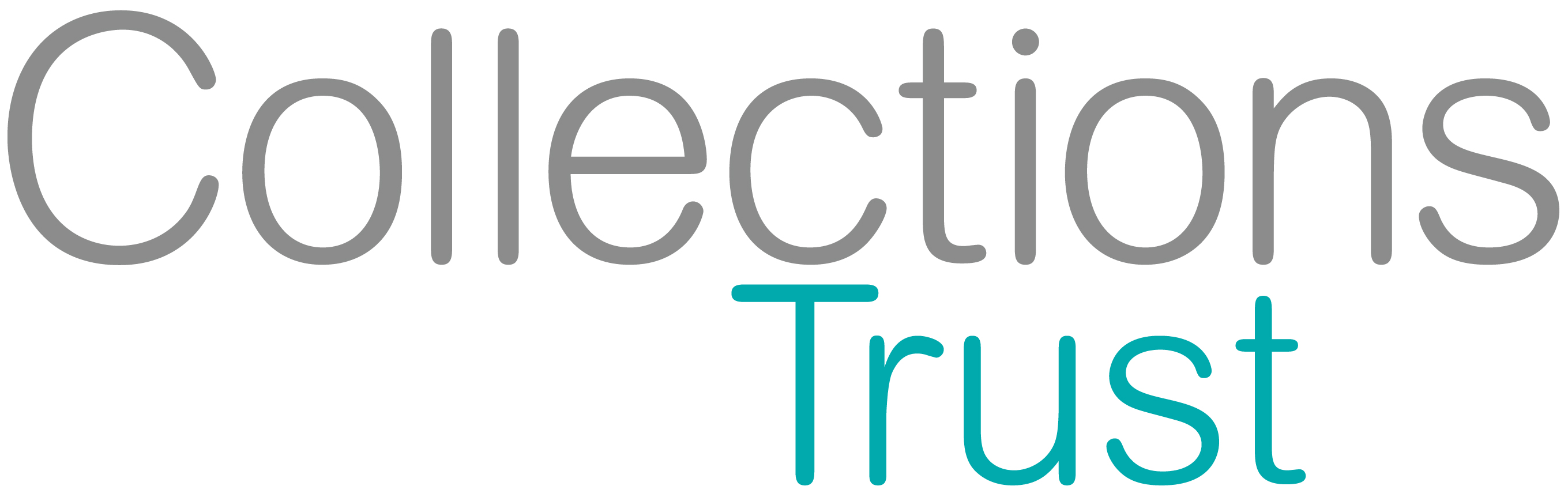
- The Collections Trust logo
- Founded: 1977
- Location(s): Collections Trust; Rich Mix; 35-47 Bethnal Green Road; London, E1 6LA
- Region served: International
- Products: Collections management standards, publications and events
- Key people: Kevin Gosling, Chief Executive
- Website: www.collectionstrust.org.uk
- Formerly called: Museum Documentation Association

The Collections Trust is an independent UK-based charity that works with museums, libraries, galleries and archives worldwide to improve the management and use of collections. It was established in February 1977 as the Museum Documentation Association (MDA) and re-launched as the Collections Trust in 2008. Its head office is in Shoreditch, London.

== Mission and aims ==
Collections Trust helps museums capture and share the information that gives their objects meaning. Our standards and advice are used around the world to make museum collections accessible.

The Collections Trust is a registered charity (Registered No. 273984). The charitable purposes were set out in 1977 and are:

- To promote the education of the public by the development of museums and similar organisations by all appropriate methods;
- To develop, promote, maintain and improve standards of collections and information management in museums, art galleries, heritage organisations and other collecting institutions;
- To provide services and resources which improve the standards and methods of collections management and use.

== Work ==
=== Standards and publications ===
The Collections Trust developed the SPECTRUM Standard – the Museum Collections Management Standard – in 1994. The standard details how to manage collections and what to do with artefacts at each stage of their lifecycle in a collection. The Standard is now in its fifth edition and is used by the majority of museums. It has been translated into several languages including Dutch and Flemish.

The organisation also produces collections management best practice guides and benchmarking tools. It has particular expertise in digital collections management and the use of new technology for museums, such as 3D imaging. Many of its resources are freely available on its website.

=== Events ===
The Collections Trust hosts a number of practical workshops and seminars for collections management professionals and an annual conference. At this conference the Collections Trust's Awards are presented. Previous award winners include:

2012

- Collections Practice Award – Victoria & Albert Museum
- Collections on a Budget Award - Museum of British Surfing

2013

- Collections Practice Award - Royal Albert Memorial Museum & Art Gallery
- Collections on a Budget Award - East Grinstead Museum
- Participatory Practice Award - Beaney House of Art and Knowledge

2014

- Collections Practice Award - Museum of London
- Collections on a Budget Award - Hayle Oral History Project
- Participatory Practice Award - Public Catalogue Foundation
- Enterprise in Museums Award - Tyne & Wear Archives & Museums
- Collections Manager of the Year Award - Jamie Everitt of the Norfolk Museums Service
- Young Collections Professional Award - Jenny Webb of The Lightbox

=== Funded projects ===
The Collections Trust works on many projects that are funded by Arts Council England and by the European Commission. It is currently managing 20m Euros worth of EC projects, including Athena Plus, Digital Cultural Heritage Roadmap for Preservation (DCH-RP)], EEXCESS, EU Collections Competencies Project (EUColComp)], Europeana Food and Drink and Europeana Inside. The Collections Trust leads the UK's involvement in the Europeana project.

=== Partnershps ===
Collections Trust is one of three partners in the Museum Data Service, launched in September 2024.

== History ==
The early team at the MDA was led by Martin Porter and included researchers Andrew Roberts (who later became head of the MDA) and Richard Light. Early achievements included the production of the Social History and Industrial Classification Scheme (SHIC) in 1983 (in partnership with the SHIC Working Party), the MDA Data Standard in 1991, and the SPECTRUM standard in 1994.

== See also ==
- Museums Computer Group
- UKOLN
- Museums Association
- Institute of Conservation
