= Getty Research Institute =

Organization with archives and databases for art history and provenance research

Coordinates: 34°4′37″N 118°28′32″W

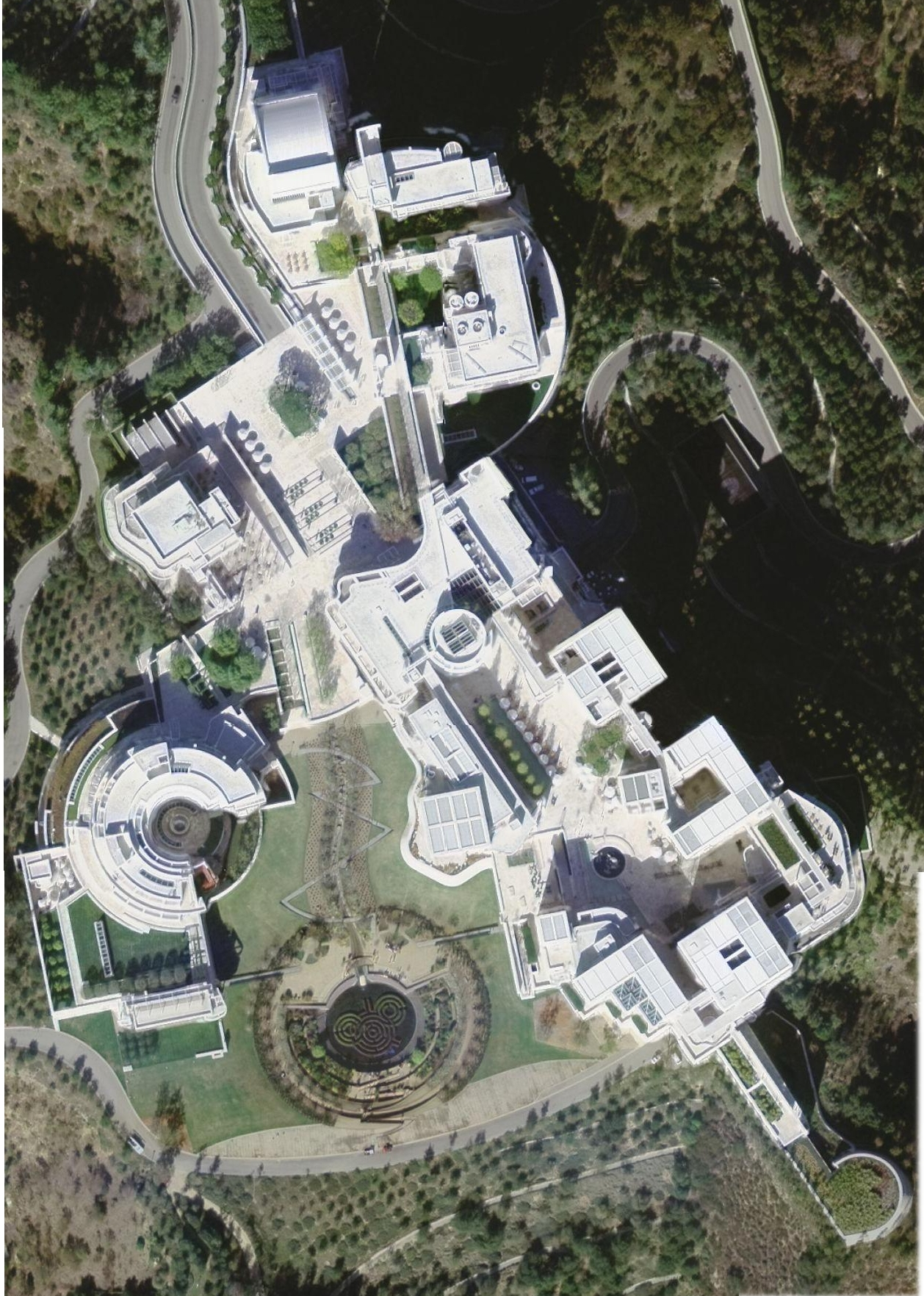
- USGS satellite image of the Getty Center in Los Angeles, California; the Getty Research Institute (GRI) is located in the circular building in the bottom left.
- Founded: 1985; 41 years ago
- Founder: J. Paul Getty
- Purpose: Dedicated to furthering knowledge and advancing understanding of the visual arts
- Location: Los Angeles, California, United States
- Method: Grants, research
- Owner: J. Paul Getty Trust
- Website: getty.edu/research

The Getty Research Institute (GRI) is a public research institute and library, operated by the J. Paul Getty Trust in Los Angeles, California. Located at the Getty Center, the GRI maintains a research library, organizes exhibitions and other events, sponsors a residential scholars program, publishes books, and produces electronic databases (Getty Publications).

== History ==
The GRI was originally called the "Getty Center for the History of Art and the Humanities", and was first discussed in 1983. It was located in Santa Monica, California, and its first director (beginning in 1985) was Kurt W. Forster. GRI's library had 30,000 volumes in 1983, but grew to 450,000 volumes by 1986.

In a statement upon his departure in 1992, Forster summarized his tenure as "Beginning with the rudiments of a small museum library... the center grew... to become one of the nation's preeminent research centers for arts and culture...". In 1994, Salvatore Settis, a professor of the history of classical art and archeology in Italy, became the director of the Center. By 1996, the Center's name had been changed to "Getty Research Institute for the History of Art and the Humanities", and by 1999 it was known simply as "Getty Research Institute".

When the Getty Information Institute (formerly the Art History Information Program, established in 1983) was dissolved in 1999 as a "result of a change of leadership at the Getty Trust", GRI absorbed "many of its functions".

In 2000, Thomas E. Crow was selected as GRI director to replace Settis who had resigned in 1999. Crow announced in October 2006 that he would be leaving for New York University. In November 2007 Thomas W. Gaehtgens became GRI's director; he was previously (1985–86) a visiting scholar with the Getty Center for the History of Art and the Humanities. He served in the position until 2019 when Mary Miller was appointed as the new GRI director.

== Programs ==
=== Library ===
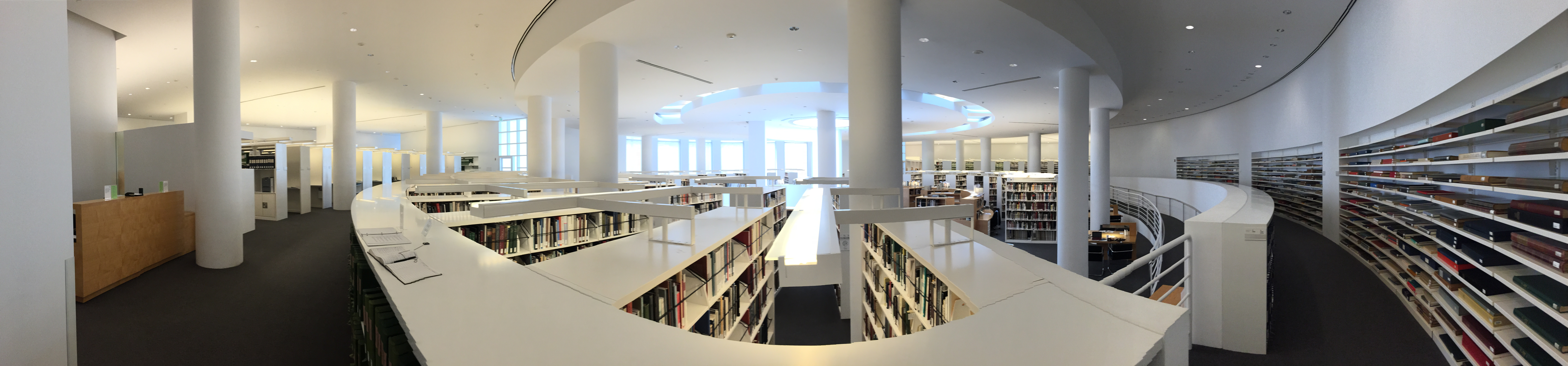
Panorama of the interior of the Getty Research Institute Library

Among other holdings, GRI's research library contains over 1 million volumes of books, periodicals, and auction catalogs; special collections; and two million photographs of art and architecture.

The library is located at the Getty Center, and does not circulate its collections, but does extend library privileges to any visitor.

=== Exhibitions and other events ===
GRI holds two public exhibitions per year in its two galleries which "focus primarily on the special collections of the Research Library or on work produced by artists in residence". For example, in 2005–2006 GRI held an exhibition entitled "Julius Shulman, Modernity and the Metropolis". The exhibition traveled to the National Building Museum and to the Art Institute of Chicago. Other GRI exhibitions have included "Overdrive: L.A. Constructs the Future, 1940-1990", co-organized with the museum in 2013, "World War I: War of Images, Images of War" in 2015, and "Cave Temples of Dunhuang: Buddhist Art on China's Silk Road", co-organized with Getty Conservation Institute in 2016.

In addition to exhibitions, GRI organizes lectures (open to the public), colloquia (most open to the public), workshops (by invitation only), and screenings of films and videos (open to the public).

GRI also holds online exhibitions. In 2017 it launched its first online-only exhibition, "The Legacy of Ancient Palmyra". This exhibition was relaunched in 2021 as "Return to Palmyra" with new content and Arabic translations. Its next online exhibition was "Bauhaus: Building the New Artist", which was launched in 2019 in tandem with its gallery exhibition "Bauhaus Beginnings".

In 2013 the GRI gallery underwent a renovation that added an additional 2,000 square feet to its existing 800 square feet of space.

=== Residential scholars program ===
The residential scholars program seeks to "integrate the often isolated territory of art history into the wider sphere of the humanities". The first class of scholars arrived in 1985–1986; they had their salaries paid for and their housing provided but were under "absolutely no obligation to produce," a policy that continues to this day. Among the notable scholars was German writer Christa Wolf in 1992–1993, who wrote the novel Medea: a modern retelling during her year at GRI.

Each year the scholars are invited to work on projects related to an annual theme. The lengths of stay vary: Getty scholars are in residence for three, six or nine months, visiting scholars for one to three months, and predoctoral and postdoctoral fellows for a nine-month academic year.

=== Publications ===
GRI publishes "Series Imprints" books in the categories of "Issues and Debates", "Texts & Documents", "Introduction To" (on "cultural heritage information in electronic form"), and "ReSources" (on the library's special collections). In addition, GRI publishes exhibition catalogs and other materials in hardcopy form.

In 2021, Käthe Kollwitz: Prints, Process, Politics (edited by Louis Marchesano, ISBN 978-1-60606-615-7), which accompanied an exhibition of the same name that ran at GRI and the Art Institute of Chicago between 2019 and 2020, won the College Art Association's Alfred H. Barr Jr. Award for distinguished catalogues in the history of art.

GRI publishes a peer-reviewed academic journal, the Getty Research Journal, that presents work "related to the Getty's collections, initiatives, and research". Started in 2009, the journal publishes one annual issue and is slated to begin biannual publication in 2021.

=== Electronic databases ===
Among the electronic databases from the former Getty Information Institute that GRI continues to produce are:

- Getty Vocabulary Program databases (Art & Architecture Thesaurus (AAT), Getty Thesaurus of Geographic Names (TGN), and Union List of Artist Names (ULAN))
- Bibliography of the History of Art (BHA)
- Getty Provenance Index which holds records of collections, auction sales and other information for researching the art market and the provenance of works.
- The Getty Research Portal provides free access to fully digitized art history texts in the public domain. The database launched in 2012 and is a collaboration with libraries that are digitizing art history books. Initial contributors include the Avery Architectural & Fine Arts Library at Columbia University, the Biblioteca de la Universidad de Málaga, the Frick Art Reference Library, the Getty Research Institute, the Heidelberg University Library, the Institut national d'histoire de l'art, members of the New York Art Resources Consortium, and the Thomas J. Watson Library at the Metropolitan Museum of Art.

In 2006, GRI and the OCLC Online Computer Library Center announced that the Getty Vocabularies (Art & Architecture Thesaurus, Getty Thesaurus of Geographic Names, and Union List of Artist Names) will be available as a Web service.

Until July 1, 2009, the Getty Information Institute and later GRI co-produced the Avery Index to Architectural Periodicals with the Avery Architectural and Fine Arts Library. On that date, GRI transferred the database back to Columbia University, which continues to maintain it.

The Getty Research Institute also participates in the German/American Provenance Research Exchange Program (PREP), which trains researchers specializing in Holocaust-era provenance projects.

== Special collections ==
GRI holds many important archives related to artists, architects, and art collectors. It also houses the institutional archives of past and current programs of Getty Trust.

Already by 1985, the Getty had acquired the complete archive of the American sculptor Malvina Hoffman. In 2011, it acquired Harald Szeemann’s substantial archive, consisting of more than 1,000 boxes of correspondence, research files, drawings, and ephemera, as well as some 28,000 books and 36,000 photographs. It also owns several art dealers' archives, including records for the Goupil & Cie and Boussod Valadon galleries, Knoedler Gallery, and the Duveen Brothers. It also owns the papers of gallery owner Clara Diament Sujo and the records of Stendhal Art Galleries.

The GRI’s Special Collections includes archives of major modern and contemporary artists and movements. In 2019 it acquired the complete archives of sculptor Claes Oldenburg and his wife Coosje van Bruggen. It has collecting strengths in early twentieth-century European modern art movements including Dada and Surrealism, Italian Futurism, Russian Modernism, and Bauhaus.

Additionally, the GRI's holdings in the field of experimental art includes archives related to many important mid-century 20th-century movements and groups, including the Japanese avant-garde, Fluxus, Experiments in Art and Technology (E.A.T.), and the Situationist International. It also holds papers relating to music, dance, and film media, including the papers of composer David Tudor, the archives of dancers Simone Forti and Yvonne Rainer, the Long Beach Museum of Art video archive, and the recordings of the New York performance space The Kitchen.

GRI has significant archives in feminist art, including the papers of the activist group Guerrilla Girls and feminist conceptual artist Mary Kelly. It also owns the video archives of the Woman's Building, a Los Angeles-based arts and education center. In 2018 GRI received a grant through the Save America's Treasures program to process and digitize 11 archives related to the Woman's Building, including the records of Feminist Art Workers, Sisters for Survival, Mother Art, the Waitresses, Barbara T. Smith, Faith Wilding, and Nancy Buchanan.

In the field of performance art, the GRI collections include the papers of Allan Kaprow and Rachel Rosenthal, as well as Robert R. McElroy, who photographically documented many early “Happenings”. It also has the records of High Performance magazine and the Los Angeles Contemporary Exhibitions (LACE) space.

GRI houses archives of several major mid-century, California-based architects, including Frank Gehry, Paul R. Williams, John Lautner, Ray Kappe, and William Krisel. In addition, it has the papers of architectural photographers Lucien Hervé and Julius Shulman. It also has the collections of architectural critic Ada Louise Huxtable and architectural historian Thomas S. Hines.

GRI’s photography collections include the work of French darkroom pioneer Louis Rousselet and the 19th-century travel photographs of Honoré d’Albert, VIII Duc de Luynes. It owns collections of the work of German and Hungarian collaborators Shunk-Kender, German-Argentine photographer Grete Stern, and Venezuelan art critic and photographer Alfredo Boulton. Additionally, it also has archives of American photographers Robert Mapplethorpe and Allan Sekula, as well as those of magazine editor Alexander Liberman.

GRI owns over 27,000 prints from as early as the 16th century. These include a complete set of the oeuvre of Giovanni Battista Piranesi and the Speculum romanae magnificentiae of Antonio Lafreri. It also has significant prints from China during the Qing dynasty, including Complete Map of the World by Ferdinand Verbiest, Battles of the Emperor of China, and Garden of Perfect Clarity. It also has a collection of rare botanical books and woodblocks from the 16th through 19th centuries belonging to Tania Norris.

The GRI collections also possess sketchbooks of many important artists, including Francesco di Giorgio Martini, Jacques-Louis David, Charles Percier, Adolph Menzel, Félix Bracquemond, Edmond Aman-Jean, Ernst Ludwig Kirchner, Malvina Hoffman, Diego Rivera, and Mark Rothko.

== Research projects and initiatives ==
Among GRI's special projects was "L.A. as Subject: The Transformative Culture of Los Angeles Communities" conducted between 1995 and 1999, whose purposes included "enhanc[ing] existing resources and develop new resources that support new research scholarship on LA and also encourag[ing] the preservation, conservation, and display of local material culture".

In collaboration with local organizations, GRI published Cultural Inheritance/L.A.: A Resource Directory of Less Visible Archives and Collections in the Los Angeles Region in 1999. In 2000, the L.A. as Subject project was transferred to the University of Southern California, which continues to update and expand an online version of the resource directory.

Pacific Standard Time, one of Getty's most ambitious and important ongoing projects, began as a 2002 initiative between GRI and Getty Foundation meant to preserve postwar Los Angeles art history that risked being lost or inaccessible. It grew out of an oral history project at GRI and was initially called "On the Record." At first the initiative consisted of grants to local museums and libraries as well as GRI acquiring "papers, videos, photographs, and other records from the period."

The first set of Pacific Standard Time exhibitions, called "Pacific Standard Time: Art in L.A., 1945-1980," was coordinated between Getty and other Los Angeles museums between 2011 and 2012. Over 60 institutions who were awarded grants totaling about $10 million participated by presenting exhibitions and programs on California art history. The second iteration of Pacific Standard Time was "Modern Architecture in L.A." in 2013. The third set of exhibitions was "Pacific Standard Time: LA/LA" in 2017-2018, which sought to place Los Angeles and Latin American art in dialogue. This iteration extended beyond modern and contemporary art to include exhibitions on the ancient and pre-modern eras. The Los Angeles County Economic Development Corporation's Institute for Applied Economics found that LA/LA "created over 4,000 jobs, added $430 million in economic output [to] the regional economy, and supported labor income (wages) of nearly $188 million."

One of the major impacts of Pacific Standard Time was that it established Los Angeles and the west coast, not just New York City, as a major center of art production in the postwar United States. ARTnews named Pacific Standard Time as the most important art exhibition of the 2010s.

In 2011 GRI acquired Ed Ruscha's Streets of Los Angeles archive, which includes "thousands of negatives, hundreds of photographic contact sheets, and related documents and ephemera." In 2020 GRI launched the website "12 Sunsets: Exploring Ed Ruscha's Archive," which compiles over 65,000 photographs that Ruscha took of buildings along Sunset Boulevard between 1965 and 2007.

In 2018 GRI announced the African American Art History Initiative, which seeks to "strengthen its African-American holdings through key archival acquisitions," beginning with the acquisition of the archive of assemblage artist Betye Saar.

GRI is funding a digitization of "The General History of the Things of New Spain", also known as the Florentine Codex, a 16th-century illuminated manuscript written in Nahuatl and Spanish describing Aztec life in what is now Mexico City at the time of the Spanish conquest.

== Employees and budget ==
During the period July 2006 – June 2007, GRI had approximately 200 full-time and part-time employees, and a budget of $63.7 million. Between July 2017 – June 2018, its budget was $68.6 million.
