= Art Libraries Society =

Organization for the visual arts based in London

ARLIS/UK & Ireland: the Art Libraries Society is the professional organisation for people involved in providing library and information services in the visual arts.

== History ==
Founded in the UK in 1969, at the Central School of Art and Design, it was the first national organisation for art librarians. Initially named ARLIS, in 1985 the name was changed to ARLIS/UK & Eire, and again in 1993 to ARLIS/UK & Ireland. ARLIS/UK & Ireland became a registered charity in 1995.

== Publications ==
=== The Art Libraries Journal ===
Founded in 1976, The Art Libraries Journal (ALJ) is an international quarterly, facilitated by ARLIS/UK & Ireland, which serves the art library community. It was the first academic journal dedicated to visual arts librarianship, and is the main international forum for the profession worldwide. The ALJ has been published by Cambridge University Press since 2016, prior to this it was printed by Titus Wilson.

== See also ==
- Art Libraries Society of North America
- Art library (in German)
- List of art libraries (in German)
- List of library associations
