= Everett Ellin =

American museum official, art dealer, engineer, lawyer, and talent agent

Everett Bernard Ellin (1928–2011) was an American museum official, art dealer, engineer, lawyer, and talent agent. As the first executive director of the Museum Computer Network, he played a key role in museums' adoption of computer technology to catalog their holdings.

Ellin was born on October 3, 1928, in Chicago, Illinois. He studied at the University of Michigan, from which he received a bachelor's degree in engineering, and at Harvard Law School, from which he received a law degree in 1952. He served in the Air Force during the Korean War, with duties that included drafting regulations regarding technological obsolescence. After leaving the Air Force, he worked for a time as a lawyer, serving as a law clerk with the California Supreme Court and as in-house counsel at Columbia Pictures. He also worked as an assistant to a William Morris Agency executive.

Urged by his then-girlfriend, painter Joan Jacobs, Ellin opened the Everett Ellin Gallery in 1957 on Santa Monica Boulevard in Los Angeles. He showed work by Jacobs and other California artists. In 1958, he closed the gallery and moved to New York, where he worked for blue-chip art and antiques gallery French and Company—it had recently started a contemporary art program, which was helmed by art critic Clement Greenberg. Ellin returned to Los Angeles and reopened his gallery on Sunset Boulevard in 1960, where it remained until 1963. The gallery hosted an exhibition of work by Niki de Saint-Phalle and Jean Tinguely in March 1962, along with the first American Action de Tir by Saint-Phalle in an alley off the Sunset Strip.

Ellin died of pneumonia on September 16, 2011.
