= Social History and Industrial Classification =

Social History and Industrial Classification (SHIC) is a classification system used by many British museums for social history and industrial collections. It was first published in 1983.

== Purpose ==
SHIC classifies materials (books, objects, recordings etc.) by their interaction with the people who used them. For example, a carpenter's hammer is classified with other tools of the carpenter, and not with a blacksmith's hammer. In contrast other classification systems, for example the Dewey Decimal Classification, might class all hammers together and close to the classification for other percussive tools. The specialist subject network, Social History Curator's Group (SHCG), obtained funding in 2012 to develop an on-line version, now on their website http://www.shcg.org.uk/

== Scheme ==
Materials are classified under four major category numbers:

- Community life
- Domestic and family life
- Personal life
- Working life

Further classification within a category is by the use of further numbers after the decimal point.

It is permissible to assign more than one classification in cases where the object had more than one use.
