= Visual Resources Association =

- Visual Resources Association
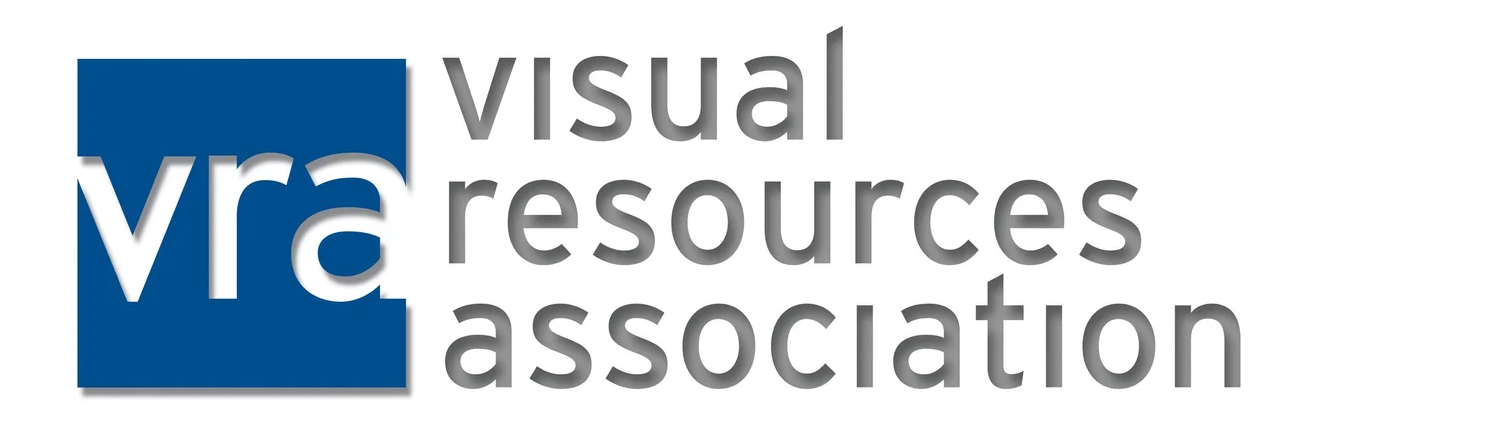
- VRA logo
- Abbreviation: VRA
- Formation: 1982
- Type: Professional association
- Legal status: Not-for-profit corporation
- Purpose: Research and education
- Region served: Delaware, U.S.
- Field: Library and information science
- Website: www.vraweb.org

The Visual Resources Association (also known as VRA) is an international organization for image media professionals.

VRA was founded in 1982 by slide librarians (visual resources curators) who were members of the College Art Association (CAA), the South Eastern Art Conference (SECAC), the Art Libraries Society of North America (ARLIS/NA), and the Mid-America College Art Association (MACAA). The association is concerned with creating, describing, and distributing digital images and other media; educating image professionals; and developing standards. It also supports research and education in visual resources, and provides educational, literary, and scientific outreach to the archival and library community and the general public.

== Goals ==
The association is a multi-disciplinary organization whose purpose is furthering research and education in the field of image management in educational, cultural heritage, and commercial environments. The VRA develops standards, offers educational programs, and publishes a variety of material. It offers a forum for preservation of and access to digital and analog images of visual culture; cataloging and classification standards and practices; integration of technology-based instruction and research; intellectual property policy; and other topics of interest to the field. It works with the broader information management and educational communities to support the primacy of visual information in documenting and understanding the cultural experience.

== Membership ==
In 2010, the VRA had 800 members, mostly from the United States and Canada, but also from Israel, Mexico, and the United Kingdom. The membership includes: information specialists; digital image specialists; art, architecture, film and video librarians; museum curators; slide, photograph, microfilm, and digital archivists; architectural firms; galleries; publishers; image system vendors; rights and reproductions officials; photographers; art historians; artists; and scientists.

As of 2025, there are three regional chapters, including Mid-Atlantic, New England, and Southern California.

The VRA Board consists of seven officers. In 2025, the current president is Xiaoli Ma.

== History ==
From 1968, visual resources curators had been meeting during the College Art Association's annual conferences to discuss issues of particular interest to those involved with the management of art slide collections. During the next few years, the group remained essentially an ad hoc committee.

By the late 1970s, regional and international activity had begun. The Comité International d'Histoire de l'Art (CIHA) recognized the visual resources subgroup as an important part of that international association. Visual resources sessions were provided during its conference in Bologna in 1979, and continued for almost 20 years. The Southeastern College Art Conference (SECAC) and the Mid-America College Art Association (MACAA) included visual resources sessions at their conferences.

Visual resources curators within the MACAA group, led by Nancy DeLaurier of the University of Missouri, Kansas City, met during MACAA’s annual conferences. In 1972, this group began to meet independently, creating workshops and sessions on various aspects of visual resources maintenance. For the workshops, members developed several kits for the benefit of attending visual resources managers. These kits included information on slide room management, standards, and other practical aspects of the profession. This group also created a newsletter, Slides and Photographs Newsletter, which contained news and information on issues of concern to members. This newsletter was supported by CAA and later by MACAA and eventually became known as the International Bulletin for Photographic Documentation of the Visual Arts.

In 1982, after almost a decade of informal association, visual resources curators active in CAA, MACAA, SECAC, and ARLIS/NA, formalized an independent association and held the first official meeting during the annual CAA meeting in Philadelphia in February 1983.

In the 1990s, the explosion of the Internet and the consequent expansion of the visual resources field to include digital media expanded the role of the association. It led in the effort to develop public understanding of intellectual property rights, protocols for dissemination of digital material, standards of cataloging, and the importance of broad public access to digital cultural information. As an organization, it participated in the Copyright Town Meetings organized by the National Initiative for a Networked Cultural Heritage (NINCH) which were held across the country between 1997 and 2004, and were open to the public.

The annual conferences began attracting non-members, while the association's official website evolved into a source of information for students, professionals, free-lance photographers, even IPR rights managers. Cataloging Cultural Objects (CCO) gained national recognition as an attempt to standardize the cataloging of visual information, and its workshops, web site, and outreach efforts began educating a broad audience.

The Education Committee sponsored conference workshops on topics of broad interest at the VRA conference and also at other professional conferences. The Digital Scene, a feature of vraweb.org, featured information on collaborative projects, new standards in imaging and metadata, digital preservation issues, consortial projects, training opportunities, and reports from the field. In 2004, the VRA, in conjunction with the ARLIS/NA, began offering a Summer Educational Institute to provide in-depth educational to new professionals.

== Professional awards ==
=== VRA Distinguished Service Award ===
Each year the Visual Resources Association honors an individual who has made an outstanding career contribution to the field of visual resources and image management. Nominees must have achieved a level of distinction in the field either through leadership, research, or service to the profession. The award has gone to:

- 2019 Robb Detlefs
- 2018 Betha Whitlow
- 2017 Allan T. Kohl
- 2016 Ann Baird Whiteside
- 2015 Maureen Burns
- 2014 Macie Hall
- 2013 Elisa Lanzi
- 2012 Kathe Hicks Albrecht
- 2011 Eileen Fry
- 2008 Christine E. Hilker
- 2007 Maryly Snow
- 2006 Lynda S. White
- 2005 John Taormina
- 2004 Jenni Rodda
- 2003 Margaret N. Webster
- 2002 Sandra C. Walker
- 2001 Linda McRae
- 2000 Elizabeth J. Antrim
- 1999 Rebecca M. Hoort
- 1998 Brenda MacEachern
- 1997 Christina B. Updike
- 1996 Nancy Shelby Schuller
- 1995 Eleanor Fink
- 1994 Eleanor Collins and Margaret Nolan
- 1993 Luraine Tansey
- 1991 Joy Blouin and Helene E. Roberts
- 1989 Nancy DeLaurier
- 1988 Christine L. Sundt

=== VRA Nancy DeLaurier Award ===
The Nancy DeLaurier Award, named for one of the pioneers of the visual resources profession (who received the VRA Distinguished Service Award in 1989), annually honors a visual resources professional for distinguished achievement in the field. Past recipients are:

- 2017 Anne Young
- 2014 Ann Baird Whiteside
- 2013 Greg Reser
- 2012 Gretchen Wagner
- 2011 Renate Wiedenhoeft
- 2010 Murtha Baca and Patricia Harpring
- 2009 Loy Zimmerman
- 2008 Kathleen Cohen
- 2007 Norine Duncan and Susan Jane Williams
- 2005 John Taormina and Mary Wassermann
- 2003 Allan T. Kohl and Christina B. Updike
- 2002 Christine L. Sundt

== Publications ==
- VRA Bulletin, a scholarly journal, is the flagship publication of the Association.
- Membership Directory is published annually.
- Special Bulletins are occasional publications on specific topics.
- VRA-L is the Listserv, for members only.
- VRAweb.org is the public website, with both public and members-only sections.

=== Standards ===
==== Cataloguing Cultural Objects (CCO) ====
Cataloging Cultural Objects: A Guide to Describing Cultural Works and Their Images (CCO) is a data content standard published in 2006, sponsored by VRA, and published by the American Library Association (ALA). The project was largely funded by the Getty Foundation. The guide was designed for those who describe and document works of art, architecture, and cultural artifacts.

==== VRA Core Categories ====
VRA Core Categories is an XML-based data standard for describing collections of visual resources. It was developed by VRA Data Standards Committee based on Dublin Core and CDWA. The standard is specifically designed to describe cultural objects and images that represent them. The first version was published in 1996, with revisions in 1998, 2002, 2004, and 2007 (resulting in the current version, 4.0). In November 2010, the Network Development and MARC Standards Office of the Library of Congress began hosting VRA Core 4 in partnership with the VRA. Since 2014 a VRA Ontology is available to transform VRA Core 4 XML data into RDF/XML.

VRA Core data structure uses one-to-one principle: only one object or resource can be described by a single metadata set. A record in VRA Core data can represent one of the three types of resources: work (unique object being described), image (visual representation of work), or collection (a set of multiple works). The following example shows the record fragment describing creator and title of the architectural object:

<agentSet>
  <agent>
    <name type="personal">Wright, Frank Lloyd</name>
    <dates type="life">
      <earliestDate>1867</earliestDate>
      <latestDate>1959</latestDate>
    </dates>
    <culture>American</culture>
    <role>architect</role>
  </agent>
</agentSet>
<titleSet>
  <title type="brandName">Fallingwater</title>
<titleSet>

VRA Core 4.0 was endorsed by Metadata Encoding and Transmission Standard Editorial Board as an extension schema for objects that contain images of cultural heritage resources. It is also used by Harvard University Visual Information Access Catalog and UK Visual Arts Data Service.

== Events ==
=== Annual conference ===
The association's annual conference is held in a different city each year. It features workshops, sessions, tours, and seminars, along with social interaction and vendor displays.

- 2024, Minneapolis
- 2023, San Antonio
- 2022, Baltimore
- 2021, Chicago (virtual)
- 2020, Baltimore (canceled)
- 2019, Los Angeles
- 2018, Philadelphia
- 2017, Louisville
- 2016, Seattle
- 2015, Denver
- 2014, Milwaukee
- 2013, Providence
- 2012, Albuquerque
- 2011, Minneapolis
- 2010, Atlanta
- 2009, Toronto
- 2008, San Diego
- 2007, Kansas City
- 2006, Baltimore
- 2005, Miami
- 2004, Portland
- 2003, Houston
- 2002, St. Louis
- 2001, Chicago
- 2000, San Francisco
- 1999, Los Angeles
- 1998, Philadelphia
- 1997, New York
- 1996, Boston

=== Summer Educational Institute ===
The Summer Educational Institute (SEI) is a joint project with ARLIS/NA. It offers standardized training in image collection management, with a focus on the transition from analog to digital collections. It is held in varied geographical locations to permit maximum attendance:

- 2018, University of New Mexico, Albuquerque
- 2017, University of North Carolina, Chapel Hill
- 2016, University of North Carolina, Chapel Hill
- 2015, University of Illinois, Urbana-Champaign
- 2014, University of Illinois, Urbana-Champaign
- 2013, University of Michigan, Ann Arbor
- 2012, University of Michigan, Ann Arbor
- 2011, University of New Mexico
- 2010, University of New Mexico
- 2009, Simmons College
- 2008, James Madison University
- 2007, Indiana University
- 2006, Reed College
- 2005, Duke University
- 2004, Duke University

== See also ==
- Slide library
- Art Libraries Society of North America
- Metadata standards

== Bibliography ==
- Art Libraries Society of North America. 1983. Standards for art libraries and fine arts slide collections. Tucson, AZ: Art Libraries Society of North America.
- Baca, Murtha, Patricia Harpring, Elisa Lanzi, Linda McRae, and Ann Whiteside. 2006. Cataloging cultural objects: a guide to describing cultural works and their images. Chicago: American Library Association.
- Freeman, Carla Conrad, and Barbara Stevenson. 1995. The visual resources directory: art slide and photograph collections in the United States and Canada. Visual resources series. Englewood, Colo: Libraries Unlimited.
- Irvine, Betty Jo, and Eileen Fry. 1979. Slide libraries: a guide for academic institutions, museums, and special collections. Littleton, Colo: Libraries Unlimited.
- Schuller, Nancy S. 1989. Management for visual resources collections. Englewood, Colo: Libraries Unlimited.
- Sutcliffe, Glyn. 1995. Slide collection management in libraries and information units. Aldershot, England: Gower.
- Walker, Sandra C., Donald W. Beetham, and Norine D. Cashman. 1999. Image buyers' guide: an international directory of sources for slides and digital images for art and architecture. Visual resources series. Englewood, Colo: Libraries Unlimited.
- White, Brenda. 1967. Slide collections: a survey of their organisation in libraries in the fields of architecture, building, and planning. Edinburgh: Brenda White, 21 Morningside Gardens.
