= Getty Thesaurus of Geographic Names =

The Getty Thesaurus of Geographic Names (abbreviated TGN) is a product of the J. Paul Getty Trust included in the Getty Vocabulary Program. The TGN includes names and associated information about places. Places in TGN include administrative political entities (e.g., cities, nations) and physical features (e.g., mountains, rivers). Current and historical places are included. Other information related to history, population, culture, art and architecture is included.

The resource is available to museums, art libraries, archives, visual resource collection catalogers, bibliographic projects through private license or available to members of the general public for free on the Getty Vocabulary website (see external links).

The Getty vocabulary databases (Art & Architecture Thesaurus (AAT), Union List of Artist Names (ULAN), and TGN) are produced and maintained by the Getty Vocabulary Program. They are compliant with ISO and NISO standards for thesaurus construction. They contain terms, names, and other information about people, places, things, and concepts relating to art, architecture, and material culture.

The Getty vocabularies can be used in three ways: at the data entry stage, by catalogers or indexers who are describing works of art, architecture, material culture, archival materials, visual surrogates, or bibliographic materials; as knowledge bases, providing information for researchers; and as search assistants to enhance end-user access to online resources.

== History ==
Work on the TGN began in 1987, when the Getty created a department dedicated to compiling and distributing terminology, at that time called the Vocabulary Coordination Group. The AAT was already being managed by the Getty at that time, and the Getty attempted to respond to requests from the creators of art information for additional controlled vocabularies for artists' names (ULAN) and geographic names (TGN). The development of TGN was informed by an international study completed by the Thesaurus Artis Universalis (TAU), a working group of the Comité International d'Histoire de l'Art (CIHA), and by the consensus reached at a colloquium held in 1991, attended by the spectrum of potential users of geographic vocabulary in cataloging and scholarship of art and architectural history and archaeology. The initial core of the TGN was compiled from thousands of geographic names in use by various Getty cataloging and indexing projects, enlarged by information from U. S. government databases, and further enhanced by the manual entry of information from published hard-copy sources. The TGN grows and changes via contributions from the user community and editorial work of the Getty Vocabulary Program.

The basic principles under which the TGN is constructed and maintained were established by the Art & Architecture Thesaurus (AAT) and also employed for the Union List of Artist Names (ULAN): Its scope includes terminology needed to catalog and retrieve information about the visual arts and architecture; it is constructed using national and international standards for thesaurus construction; it comprises a hierarchy with tree structures corresponding to the current and historical worlds; it is based on terminology that is current, warranted for use by authoritative literary sources, and validated by use in the scholarly art and architectural history community; and it is compiled and edited in response to the needs of the user community.

TGN was founded under the management of Eleanor Fink (head of what was then called the Vocabulary Coordination Group, and subsequently Director of the Art History Information Program, later called the Getty Information Institute). TGN has been constructed over the years by numerous members of the user community and an army of dedicated editors, under the supervision of several managers. Technical support for the TGN was provided by the Getty. TGN was first published in 1997 in machine-readable files. Given the growing size and frequency of changes and additions to the TGN, hard-copy publication was deemed to be impractical. It is currently published in both a searchable online Web interface and in data files available for licensing. The data for the TGN is compiled and edited in an editorial system that was custom-built by Getty technical staff to meet the unique requirements of compiling data from many contributors, building complex and changing polyhierarchies, merging, moving, and publishing in various formats. Final editorial control of the TGN is maintained by the Getty Vocabulary Program, using well-established editorial rules. The current managers of the TGN are Patricia Harpring, Managing Editor, and Murtha Baca, Head, Vocabulary Program and Digital Resource Management.

TGN is available as Linked Open Data since August 2014.

== Terms ==
TGN is a structured vocabulary currently containing around 1,106,000 names and other information about places. Names for a place may include names in the vernacular language, English, other languages, historical names, names and in natural order and inverted order. Among these names, one is flagged as the preferred name.

TGN is a thesaurus, compliant with ISO and NISO standards for thesaurus construction; it contains hierarchical, equivalence, and associative relationships. Note that TGN is not a GIS (Geographic Information System). While many records in TGN include coordinates, these coordinates are approximate and are intended for reference only.

The focus of each TGN record is a place. There are around 912,000 places in the TGN. In the database, each place record (also called a subject) is identified by a unique numeric ID. Linked to the record for the place are names, the place's parent or position in the hierarchy, other relationships, geographic coordinates, notes, sources for the data, and place types, which are terms describing the role of the place (e.g., inhabited place and state capital). The temporal coverage of the TGN ranges from prehistory to the present and the scope is global.

== Design ==
The TGN is a faceted classification system as well as a poly-hierarchical one. There are two facets: World and Extraterrestrial. Within the World facet are Physical Features and Political Entities. One can view administrative places from as broad as continents and regions to as specific as neighborhoods, boroughs, towns, and cities. Within the Physical Features facets are mountain ranges, oceans, seas, rivers, waterfalls, island groups, and deserts.

The record for each concept includes its place in the hierarchy (with a link to its parent), as well as links to related terms, related concepts, sources for the data, and notes.

Sample TGN Record

Sample TGN Record

Sample TGN Record

== See also ==
- Art & Architecture Thesaurus (another controlled vocabulary maintained by the Getty Vocabulary Program)
- Geographic coordinate system
- Geographic Names Board
- Geographic Names Information System
- Getty Vocabulary Program
- South African Geographical Names Council
- Union List of Artist Names (ULAN)
- United Nations Conferences on Standardization of Geographical Names
- United States Board on Geographic Names
