= Murtha Baca =

American educator

- Born: October 7, 1950; California, U.S.
- Died: August 12, 2023; Granada Hills, California, U.S.

Academic background
- Education: University of California, Los Angeles

Academic work
- Discipline: Art History
- Sub-discipline: Metadata, Digital Art History
- Institutions: J. Paul Getty Trust

Murtha Baca (California, October 7, 1950 – Granada Hills, California, August 12, 2023) was an American educator and professional renowned in the field of information science, particularly for her expertise in the area of metadata and digital information systems.

== Biography ==
Baca received a PhD in art history and Italian language and literature from the University of California, Los Angeles (UCLA). Baca was hired at the Getty Information Institute in 1988 and transferred to the Getty Research Institute in 1999. Baca was a founding member and leader of the Getty Vocabulary Program, which builds and maintains multilingual controlled vocabularies for art, architecture, and material culture. Her association with the Getty Vocabulary Program spanned three decades.

Baca also worked in the Getty Provenance Index and held various other titles at the Getty Research Institute, including head of digital art history and head of digital resources management. She accrued three decades of experience as an implementer and teacher of descriptive metadata and controlled vocabularies for art and architecture. She was a lecturer at the UCLA Department of Information Studies from 1988 to 2017, teaching graduate seminars in indexing and thesaurus construction and metadata. She was a mentor to many students, several of whom later worked with her in the field.

== Scholarship ==
Baca authored, edited, and co-edited numerous academic publications throughout her career. She was a co-editor of Cataloging Cultural Objects: A Guide to Describing Cultural Works and Their Images (American Library Association) which "gives the cataloger tools to describe art, images, and cultural objects consistently" and "can be used as a model for evolving cataloging codes." She was the editor of Introduction to Metadata (Getty Research Institute, 3rd edition, 2016), which "presents an overview of metadata, including the methods, tools, and standards that support the access and use of digital resources on the web" and serves as "a recommended resource for information professionals in museums, libraries, and archives who are interested in developing a foundation in metadata concepts and practices." She led a team of scholars and technical experts that developed the Getty Research Institute's first "born-digital" scholarly publication, Pietro Mellini's Inventory in Verse, 1681: A Digital Facsimile with Translation and Commentary, published in 2015. This digital edition was a landmark project in the field of digital art history, which has since grown considerably. She was also a noted and well-published translator of Italian texts on literature and cuisine.

== Professional service and leadership ==
Baca was a leader in various professional organizations and groups related to controlled vocabularies, descriptive metadata, and digital art history. She was chair of the International Terminology Working Group, an organization of cultural heritage documentation professionals founded c. 1988 to work with multilingual thesauri. She served on the board of directors of the Museum Computer Network (MCN) from 2004 to 2006, the advisory board of the Built Works Registry (2010–2014), the Helping Interdisciplinary Vocabulary Education (HIVE) advisory board (2011), and as a technical advisor to the Digital Serlio Project (2010–2018).

== Recognition and honors ==
- ARLIS Award of Merit from Art Libraries Society, 1996
- VRA Nancy DeLaurier Award for distinguished achievement, 2010, 2015
- Distinguished Teaching Award from the UCLA Department of Information Studies, 2017

== Publications ==
- Murtha Baca, Patricia Harpring, Elisa Lanzi, Linda McRae, Ann Baird Whiteside, eds. Cataloging Cultural Objects (CCO). The Visual Resources Association. Chicago: American Library Association, 2006. https://www.alastore.ala.org/content/cataloging-cultural-objects-guide-describing-cultural-works-and-their-images
- Murtha Baca. Introduction to Metadata. 3rd edition. Los Angeles: J. Paul Getty Trust, 2016. https://www.getty.edu/publications/intrometadata/
- Murtha Baca and Anne Helmreich. "Introduction." Visual Resources 29, no. 1–2 (June 2013): 1–4. doi:10.1080/01973762.2013.761105
- Murtha Baca, Anne Helmreich, and Melissa Gill. "Digital Art History." Visual Resources 35, no. 1–2 (April 3, 2019): 1–5. doi:10.1080/01973762.2019.1556887
- Murtha Baca. "Digital Mellini: Project Update and Observations on Translating Historical Texts." Getty Research Journal 4:4 (2012): 153-160.
- Murtha Baca and Anne Helmreich. "Introduction." Visual Resources 29, no. 1–2 (June 2013): 1–4. doi:10.1080/01973762.2013.761105
- Murtha Baca and Marissa Clifford. "Developing a Digital Collaborative Research Environment: the Getty Scholars' Workspace®" Uncommon Culture Vol 7, no. 1/2 (13/14) (2018). https://journals.uic.edu/ojs/index.php/UC/article/view/9233
- Murtha Baca. "CIDOC 2014: Keynote on Digitization and Access." https://www.getty.edu/research/tools/vocabularies/cidoc_baca_keynote.pdf
- Murtha Baca and Melissa Gill. "Encoding Multilingual Knowledge Systems in the Digital Age: The Getty Vocabularies." Proceedings from North American Symposium on Knowledge Organization, Vol 5 (2015). https://journals.lib.washington.edu/index.php/nasko/article/view/15179
- Murtha Baca and Patricia Harpring. "The Getty Vocabularies and Standards: Describing, Cataloging, and Accessing Information about Architecture and Architectural Documents." In COMMA: International Journal on Archives (2014).
- Patricia Harpring and Murtha Baca, "Art Vocabulary: Categorizing Works of Art." In Handbuch Sprache in der Kunstkommunikation [Handbook of Language in Art Communication], Hausendorf, Heiko and Marcus Müller, eds. Berlin: De Gruyter Mouton, 2016. https://books.google.com/books?id=2ZjUCwAAQBAJ&dq=%22murtha+baca%22+chair&pg=PA425
- Murtha Baca. "Fear of authority? Authority control and thesaurus building for art and material culture information." Cataloging & Classification Quarterly, Volume 38, 2004 - Issue 3-4: Authority Control in Organizing and Accessing Information: Definition and International Experience. https://www.tandfonline.com/doi/abs/10.1300/J104v38n03_13
- Eve Meltzer, Julia Meltzer, et al. "Data and Metadata: An Interview with Murtha Baca and Erin Coburn: You say Ugolini Lorenzetti, I say Bartolommeo Bulgarini." Cabinet Issue 13/Futures (Spring 2004). https://www.cabinetmagazine.org/issues/13/meltzer_meltzer_baca_coburn.php
