= Museum Computer Network =

American non-profit organization

The Museum Computer Network (MCN) is a US-based non-profit organization for professionals with an interest in the use of computer technology for museums.

== Overview ==
MCN was established in 1967 in the New York City area. The history of MCN spans a period during which information technology developed at an exponential pace. The organization began as an informal grouping of museums with the goal of automating registration records. With funding from the New York Council on the Arts, MCN developed a prototype mainframe network that was shared by participants from 1968 to 1971. When the funding ended in 1971, MCN was formally incorporated as a nonprofit organization that has since attracted members from around the world. As new technology superseded the original shared registration system, MCN evolved into a network of professionals wishing to improve their means of developing, managing, and conveying museum information through the use of automation.
MCN organizes an annual conference, the MCN-L discussion forum, special interest groups, an online directory of museum websites, etc. Members include individuals, institutions and companies. The organization is run by a Board of Directors. Officers include a president, vice-president, secretary and treasurer.

== Conference ==
MCN has held an annual conference since 1979.
Recent Conferences:

2026 in Seattle, WA with the title of Trust & Longevity

2025 in Minneapolis, Minnesota

2024 in Lawrence, Kansas

2023 in Philadelphia, Pennsylvania

2021 Online with the title of What is Digital Now?

2020 Online with the title of Interface: Communities + Museums

2019 in San Diego, California with the title of Interface: Communities + Museums

2018 in Denver, Colorado with the title of Humanizing the Digital

2017 in Pittsburgh, Pennsylvania with the title of MCN 50: Looking Back, Thinking Forward, Taking Action

2016 in New Orleans, Louisiana with the title of The Human-Centered Museum
2015 in Minneapolis, Minnesota, November 4–7, 2015, with the title of The Invisible Architectures of Connected Museums.
2014 in Dallas, Texas with the title of Think Big, Start Small, Create.
2013 in Montreal, Canada with the title of Re:making Museums
2012 in Seattle, Washington with the title of Shifting Perspective, Evolving Spaces, Disruptive Technologies
2011 in Atlanta, Georgia with the title of Hacking the Museum: Innovation, Agility and Collaboration
2010 in Austin, Texas with the title of I/O: The Museum Inside-out/Outside-in
Complete list of MCN Conferences

== Spectra ==
MCN published Spectra, established in 1974. For example, the Computer Interchange of Museum Information (CIMI) Standards Framework was published in Spectra.

== See also ==
- Museums Computer Group, United Kingdom
- Museum informatics
- Everett Ellin
