= Categories for the Description of Works of Art =

Conceptual framework for describing items in art databases

- Editors: Murtha Baca, Patricia Harpring
- Language: English
- Subject: Art cataloging
- Genre: Guideline
- Publisher: J. Paul Getty Trust, College Art Association
- Publication date: 1994
- Publication place: United States
- Website: http://www.getty.edu/research/publications/electronic_publications/cdwa/

Categories for the Description of Works of Art (CDWA) is an American project now run by the J. Paul Getty Trust with the College Art Association to establish a conceptual framework for describing and accessing information about works of art, architecture, and other material culture in databases. The CDWA includes 532 categories and subcategories. A small subset of categories are considered core in that they represent the minimum information necessary to identify and describe a work. The CDWA includes discussions, basic guidelines for cataloging, and examples.

== Purpose ==
The Categories provide a framework to which existing art information systems are mapped and upon which new systems can be developed. In addition, the discussions in the CDWA identify vocabulary resources and descriptive practices that will make information residing in diverse systems both more compatible and more accessible.

The use of the CDWA framework contributes to the integrity and longevity of data and facilitates its inevitable migration to new systems as informational technology continues to evolve. It also helps to give end-users consistent, reliable access to information, regardless of the system in which it resides.

These guidelines, in theory, provide a common ground for reaching an agreement on what information should be included in art information systems and what information will be shared or exchanged with other institutions or systems. The CDWA framework is targeted towards curators, registrars, researchers, information managers, and systems vendors.

== History ==
The CDWA was created by the Art Information Task Force (AITF), which encouraged dialog between art historians, art information professionals, and information providers so that together they could develop guidelines for describing works of art, architecture, groups of objects, and visual and textual surrogates.

Formed in the early 1990s, the task force was made up of representatives from the communities that provide and use art information: art historians, museum curators and registrars, visual resource professionals, art librarians, information managers, and technical specialists. The work of the AITF was funded by the J. Paul Getty Trust, with a two-year matching grant from the National Endowment for the Humanities (NEH) to the College Art Association (CAA).

The first edition of the document was published in 1994; editors were Murtha Baca and Patricia Harpring. As of 2025, the latest revised edition was published in 2024. The CDWA is available online on J. Paul Getty Trust website.

== Core categories ==
Core CDWA categories are:

- Object/Work
- Classification
- Titles or Names
- Creation
- Measurements
- Materials and Techniques
- Subject Matter

== Influence ==
CDWA is a basis for other metadata standards, such as VRA Core, Object ID, CDWA Lite, and Cataloging Cultural Objects (CCO). Multiple museum databases and online projects use CDWA, for example, Consortium for the Computer Interchange of Museum Information's Cultural Heritage Information Online project and Museum Loan Network Directory.

== CDWA Lite ==
CDWA Lite is an XML schema created by ARTstor, the J. Paul Getty Trust, and RLG Programs/OCLC to describe core records for works of art and material culture based on CDWA and the Cataloging Cultural Objects (CCO) content standard. The schema was created because of the absence of a data content standard specifically designed for unique cultural works and a technical format for expressing this data in a machine-readable format. CDWA Lite records are intended for contribution to union catalogs and other repositories using the Open Archives Initiative (OAI) harvesting protocol. The CDWA Lite schema has been enlarged and integrated into the Lightweight Information Describing Objects (LIDO) schema, which is available on the CIDOC site.

According to Museum Computer Network 2007 conference report, Victoria and Albert Museum and Metropolitan Museum of Art used CDWA Lite in their information systems.

== Cataloging example ==
The following table shows the example of using CDWA to describe a work.

CDWA Example: oil painting
| Subcategory | Value |
|---|---|
| Object/Work type | painting |
| Classification | Paintings |
| Title or Name | Irises |
| Measurements - Dimensions | 71x93 cm |
| Materials and Techniques - Description | oil on canvas, applied with brush and palette knife |
| Creator | Vincent van Gogh |
| Creator - Role | painter |
| Creation - Date | 1889 |
| Subject Matter - Description | irises, Iridaceae, soil, nature |
| Subject Matter - Interpretation | regeneration |

== See also ==
- Getty Vocabulary Program
- Visual Resources Association
- Metadata standards
