= Art Libraries Society of North America =

Professional association

The Art Libraries Society of North America (also known as ARLIS/NA) is an organization of approximately 1,000 art librarians, library students and visual resource professionals. The ARLIS/NA was founded in 1972.

== Activities ==
ARLIS/NA organizes activities such as:

- annual conferences,
- publishing articles through publications such as Art Documentation, occasional papers, and online publications,
- providing a forum for professional communication, via listserv and a web site,
- scholarship awards,
- awards for research, service, and publication.

== History ==
Before ARLIS/NA, art librarians organized under an American Library Association Round Table, which had limited support. Meetings were only held biannually, attendance was minimal, and professional progress slow. During the post-war years, through the influence of popular magazines like Time and Life, Americans were exposed to a range of cultures, with hundreds of new museums and libraries built and an array of new publications. This led the art librarians to organize.

By the late 1960s, against ALA's wishes, a separate, and under-supported short-lived art library group was created in conjunction with an existing museum sub-section of the Association of College and Research Libraries (ACRL), a division of ALA. Member William J. Dane stated that the group "didn't like being called a sub-section. We didn't need to depend on ALA or ACRL."

ARLIS/NA was founded in 1972 by art librarians attending the American Library Association annual conference in Chicago and was the brainchild of Judith Hoffberg, who had been inspired by attending meetings of ARLIS/UK in London. The informal annual meetings of art librarians with College Art Association furthered the initiative to organize. The Association of College and Research Libraries was one of several library organizations in which art librarians were enrolled at that time.

By 1982 a major section of ARLIS/NA had broken off to form its own group, Visual Resources Association (VRA). The mission of the VRA is focused on media and image management, as well as progressing research and education in those areas.

The ARLIS/NA membership has, from its beginnings, included librarians, archivists, visual resource professionals, artists, curators, educators, publishers, as well as students and others interested in visual arts information. Annual conferences and publications, as well as listserv threads feature discussions, presentations, workshops, and other opportunities for specialized professional development interests, such as cataloging, public services, archives, and acquisitions as well as technological trends and social issues of interest to the membership as a whole. Virtual sessions are common, especially since travel was limited during the 2020 COVID-19 global pandemic.

In 2022 for the society's fiftieth anniversary, members who had served on the Strategic Directions Committee reflected on the society's history.

== Chapters ==
ARLIS/NA is an international organization with regional affiliated chapters across Canada, Mexico, and the United States. Two chapters, ARLIS/NA Texas-Mexico and ARLIS/NA Northwest, are transnational. Canadian chapters are Ontario and Montréal-Ottawa-Québec.

== Affiliates ==
ARLIS/NA has relationships with many affiliated organizations across the arts, librarianship, and visual resources management, including the American Library Association, ARLIS/UK & Ireland, the College Art Association, and REDARTE/RJ.

== Organizational structure ==
The ARLIS/NA Executive Board is composed of a president, vice-president/president-elect and past president, all of whom serve a continuous three-year term; and a secretary, treasurer, chapters liaison, Canadian liaison, advancement liaison, education liaison, and an editorial director, all of whom serve two-year terms. The ARLIS/NA Executive Director also serves on the ARLIS/NA Board.

== Presidents ==
- 1973: Judith Hoffberg
- 1974: Jean Finch
- 1975: William B. Walker
- 1976: John Murchie
- 1977: Nancy John
- 1978: Katharine Martinez Ratzenberger
- 1979: Joyce Pellerano Ludmer
- 1980: Wolfgang M. Freitag
- 1981: Karen Muller
- 1982: Caroline Backlund
- 1983: Nancy Allen
- 1984: Mary Ashe
- 1985: Toni Petersen
- 1986: Susan Craig
- 1987: Jeffrey Horrell
- 1988: Ann Abid
- 1989: Clive Phillpot
- 1990: Lynette Korenic
- 1991: Merrill Wadsworth Smith
- 1992: Betty Jo Irvine
- 1993: Deidre Stam
- 1994: Janis Ekdahl
- 1995: Edward Teague
- 1996: Jack Robertson
- 1997: Roger Lawson
- 1998: Mary Graham
- 1999: Kathryn Wayne
- 2000: Karen McKenzie
- 2001: Ted Goodman
- 2002: Daniel Starr
- 2003: Allen Townsend
- 2004: Jeanne Brown
- 2005: Margaret Webster
- 2006: Ann Whiteside
- 2007: Deborah Ultan-Boudewyns
- 2008: Ken Soehner
- 2009: Amy Lucker
- 2010: Marilyn Russell
- 2011: Jon Evans
- 2012: Deborah Kempe
- 2013: Gregory P. J. Most
- 2014: Carole Ann Fabian
- 2015: Kristen Regina
- 2016: Heather Gendron
- 2017: Eumie Imm Stroukoff
- 2018: Kim Collins
- 2019: Laura Schwartz
- 2020: Amy Trendler
- 2021: Mark Pompelia
- 2022: Rebecca Price
- 2023: Rachel Resnik
- 2024: Melanie Emerson
- 2025: Liv Valmestad
- 2026: Samantha Deutch

== Annual conferences ==
ARLIS/NA hosts a yearly conference for members to meet in person, share ideas and network.

- 2026 - 54th Annual - Montreal, Quebec, Canada
- 2025 - 53rd Annual - Fully Virtual
- 2024 - 52nd Annual - Pittsburgh, Pennsylvania
- 2023 - 51st Annual - Mexico City, México
- 2022 - 50th Annual - Chicago, Illinois
- 2021 - 49th Annual - Montreal, Quebec (virtual due to COVID-19 pandemic)
- 2020 - 48th Annual - St. Louis, Missouri (canceled due to health threat of COVID-19 pandemic)
- 2019 - 47th Annual - Salt Lake City, Utah
- 2018 - 46th Annual - New York City, New York
- 2017 - 45th Annual - New Orleans, Louisiana
- 2016 - 44th Annual - Seattle, Washington (joint with Visual Resources Association)
- 2015 - 43rd Annual - Fort Worth, Texas
- 2014 - 42nd Annual - Washington, D.C.
- 2013 - 41st Annual - Pasadena, California
- 2012 - 40th Annual - Toronto, Ontario
- 2011 - 39th Annual - Minneapolis, Minnesota (joint with Visual Resources Association)
- 2010 - 38th Annual - Boston, Massachusetts
- 2009 - 37th Annual - Indianapolis, Indiana
- 2008 - 36th Annual - Denver, Colorado
- 2007 - 35th Annual - Atlanta, Georgia
- 2006 - 34th Annual - Banff, Alberta, Canada
- 2005 - 33rd Annual - Houston, Texas
- 2004 - 32nd Annual - New York City, New York
- 2003 - 31st Annual - Baltimore, Maryland
- 2002 - 30th Annual - St. Louis, Missouri (joint with Visual Resources Association)
- 2001 - 29th Annual - Los Angeles, California
- 2000 - 28th Annual - Pittsburgh, Pennsylvania
- 1999 - 27th Annual - Vancouver, British Columbia
- 1998 - 26th Annual - Philadelphia, Pennsylvania
- 1997 - 25th Annual - San Antonio, Texas
- 1996 - 24th Annual - Miami Beach, Florida
- 1995 - 23rd Annual - Montreal, Quebec
- 1994 - 22nd Annual - Providence, Rhode Island
- 1993 - 21st Annual - San Francisco, California
- 1992 - 20th Annual - Chicago, Illinois
- 1991 - 19th Annual - Kansas City, Kansas
- 1990 - 18th Annual - New York City, New York
- 1989 - 17th Annual - Phoenix, Arizona
- 1988 - 16th Annual - Dallas, Texas
- 1987 - 15th Annual - Washington, D.C.
- 1986 - 14th Annual - New York City, New York
- 1985 - 13th Annual - Los Angeles, California
- 1984 - 12th Annual - Cleveland, Ohio
- 1983 - 11th Annual - Philadelphia, Pennsylvania
- 1982 - 10th Annual - Boston, Massachusetts
- 1981 - 9th Annual - San Francisco, California
- 1980 - 8th Annual - New Orleans, Louisiana
- 1979 - 7th Annual - Toronto, Ontario
- 1978 - 6th Annual - New York City, New York
- 1977 - 5th Annual - Los Angeles, California
- 1976 - 4th Annual - Chicago, Illinois
- 1975 - 3rd Annual - Washington, D.C.
- 1974 - 2nd Annual - Detroit, Michigan
- 1973 - 1st Annual - New York City, New York

== Awards and honors ==
ARLIS/NA offers travel awards to students and industry professionals (members and non-members) to their annual conferences.

=== Distinguished Service Award ===
One of the honors is the Distinguished Service Award which is given to an individual of any country whose exemplary service in art librarianship, visual resources curatorship, or a related field, has made an outstanding national or international contribution to art information.

=== The George Wittenborn Memorial Book Award ===
This honor recognizes excellence of content and production in North American art publications. The award is presented annually for outstanding publications in the visual arts and architecture which combine the highest standards of scholarship, design, and production.

Upon its foundation in 1974, it was called the Art Publishing Award. it was renamed in 1980 to honor George Wittenborn (1905–1974), the influential New York art book dealer and publisher.

== Outreach and communications ==
ARLIS-L is the society's listserv which functions as a forum for sharing information and discussing issues facing art librarians, library students and visual resource professionals. The listserv is also a resource for job listings. ARLIS-L is a place for society members to distribute information about ARLIS/NA activities at conferences, workshops and meetings, announcements of awards and honors, news regarding society members and information on new print and electronic publications. ARLIS-L is an open discussion list and anyone may subscribe.

== Publications ==
=== Art Documentation ===
Art Documentation is the official journal of the Art Libraries Society of North America and is published twice yearly by the University of Chicago Press. Art Documentation includes articles and information relevant to art librarianship and visual resources curatorship. The publication includes practical information for the ARLIS/NA community such as committee, conference, meeting, chapter and member updates.

=== Occasional papers and online publications ===
Manuscripts for purchase on art information issues with such topics on staffing standards and core competencies. Resources are available for download on the ARLIS/NA website.

== See also ==
- Art history
- Art Libraries Society - U.K. and Ireland equivalent
- Art library (in German)
- Judith Hoffberg
- List of art libraries (in German)
- List of library associations
- Slide library
- Special Libraries Association (SLA)
