= TOWER Software =

- Company type: Subsidiary of Hewlett-Packard
- Industry: Computer software
- Founded: 1985
- Founder: Brand Hoff
- Headquarters: Canberra, Australia
- Products: HP TRIM Records Management System software
- Website: HP Enterprise website
- Footnotes / references Acquired by Hewlett-Packard in May 2008

TOWER Software was a software development company, founded in 1985 in Canberra, Australia. The company provided and supported enterprise content management software, notably its TRIM product line for electronic records management.

TOWER Software was acquired by Hewlett-Packard Company in 2008 as a part of its HP Software Division.

== History ==
TOWER Software began making records management software in 1985. It shifted to providing electronic document and records management software with the introduction of TRIM Captura in 1998. TRIM Context was released in 2002. In 2004 the company re-branded itself as a provider of enterprise content management solutions.

TOWER Software contributed to the development of international and local standards by sitting on a working group to develop AS4390 (the Australian standard for records management), which influenced the ISO 15489 standard, and by reviewing the MoReq and DoD 5015.2 standards.

In April 2008, TOWER Software shareholders were advised of the company's intention to accept an offer by Hewlett-Packard to acquire the company for approximately US$105 million. At that time, TOWER Software had 1000 customers in 32 countries representing the public sector and highly regulated industries such as healthcare, energy and utilities, and banking and finance.

TRIM Context is now called HP TRIM Records Management System software and is based on the ISO standard 15489 for records management. TRIM software also has U.S. Department of Defense (DoD) 5015.2 certification and adheres to the principles outlined in AS4390.

== Recognition and awards ==
- KMWorld Readers' Choice Award 2006

== See also ==
- DIRKS, Design and Implementation of Record Keeping Systems
- The National Archives (UK), The National Archives
- Design Criteria Standard for Electronic Records Management Software Applications
- Paperless Office
- Document Management
- Document Imaging
