= Archives and Records Association, Ireland =

- Founded: 29 May 1979
- Type: Professional Organization
- Purpose: Archivists, Archive Conservators and Records Managers
- Origins: Merger of the National Council on Archives, Association of Chief Archivists in Local Government and the Society of Archivists
- Region served: Republic of Ireland and Northern Ireland
- Method: Accreditation, Industry standards, Conferences, Publications
- Members: 218 (2018)
- Website: ARA Ireland

The Archives and Records Association, Ireland (ARA, Ireland) is the principal professional body for archivists, archive conservators and records managers in Ireland (both the Republic of Ireland and Northern Ireland). It is a semi-autonomous affiliate of the Archives and Records Association (ARA, UK & Ireland). Both the ARA and ARA, Ireland were formed on 1 June 2010 through the merger of the National Council on Archives and the Association of Chief Archivists in Local Government with the Society of Archivists.

== Structure ==
The ARA, Ireland is one of eleven ARA regions that span Ireland and the UK, each with its own regional committee. However, it enjoys a considerably greater level of autonomy than the ten British regions.

== Membership ==
ARA, Ireland has over 170 members, mainly made up of professional archivists, records managers and archive conservators from all the different types of organisations that employ such professionals. Through an affiliate membership scheme, those who work at a paraprofessional level or who are generally interested in the work of the Association and its members can join. There is also a student membership option for those who are studying for a professional qualification in archives, records management or archive conservation.

== Publications and outreach ==
ARA, Ireland produces a newsletter three times a year, which is now published electronically. It hosts the Learn About Archives website to provide an online information service for the general public, educators, and students on archival material and archive services in Ireland.

The ARA, UK & Ireland produces a biannual publication entitled the Journal of the Society of Archivists, which covers professional issues for its members; and a monthly newsletter, ARC (Archives, records Management, Conservation).

== Training ==
The ARA, Ireland conducts a wide range of training events throughout the year for its members. Past events include Business Continuity and Disaster Planning, Disaster Management, Education & Outreach Workshop, Digital Preservation Roadshow and the Irish Archive Resource Training Day.

For Archive Conservation, the Association runs a Certificate in Archive Conservation as an in-service scheme restricted to Association members only. It is also involved in the Professional Accreditation of Conservator-Restorers (PAC-R) scheme. All professional members are encouraged to participate in the Association's Registration Scheme, which acts as a formal process of continued professional development. Those who complete the registration scheme are entitled to use the post-nominals RMARA (Registered Member Archives and Records Association).

== See also ==
- Information and Records Management Society
