= Information lifecycle management =

Strategies for managing data storage

Information lifecycle management (ILM) refers to a series of strategies aimed at managing storage systems on computing devices.

ILM is the practice of applying certain policies in an effort to accomplish effective information management. This practice originated from managing information in physical forms such as paper, microfilm, negatives, photographs, audio and video recordings. It refers to the information management of any product or process from start to end, or until its execution.

ILM encompasses every stage of a "record" from creation to disposal. While it is commonly associated to information that meets the formal definition of a record (and thus related to records management), it applies to all informational assets. During its existence, information may be designated as a record if it documents a business transaction or fulfills a specific business requirement. In this sense, ILM is a part of the broader framework of enterprise content management.

The term "business" is used in a broad sense, encompassing more than just commercial and enterprise activities. While many records pertain to business operations, others document historical events or significant moments unrelated to business endeavors. Examples including birth, death, medical/health, and educational records. e-Science, for example, is an area where ILM has become relevant.

In 2004, the Storage Networking Industry Association, on behalf of the information technology (IT) and information storage industries, attempted to assign a new and broader definition to Information Lifecycle Management (ILM). A definition published on October at the Storage Networking World conference in Orlando, Florida, stated that "ILM consists of the policies, processes, practices, and tools used to align the business value of information with the most appropriate and cost-effective IT infrastructure from the time information is conceived through its final disposition." In this view, information is aligned with business processes, through management policies and service levels associated with applications, metadata, information, and data.

== Policy ==
The ILM policy encompasses storage and information policies that guide management processes. Policies are dictated by business goals and drivers, tying into a framework of overall IT governance and management; change control processes; requirements for system availability and recovery times; and service level agreements (SLAs).

== Operational ==
Operational aspects of ILM include backup and data protection; disaster recovery, restore and restart; archiving and long-term retention; data replication; and day-to-day processes and procedures necessary to manage a storage architecture.

== Infrastructure ==
Infrastructure facets of ILM include the logical and physical architectures, applications dependent upon the storage platforms; security of storage; and data center constraints. Within the application realm, the relationship between applications and the production, test and development requirements are generally most relevant for ILM.

== Functionality ==
In business records management, five phases are identified as part of the records life cycle continuum, along with certain exceptions. The phases are as follows:

- Creation and Receipt
- Distribution / Access
- Use / Consumption
- Maintenance
- Disposition

Creation and Receipt refer to records at their point of origin, which can be the creation of records within an organization or the receipt of information from external sources. These records include correspondence, forms, reports, drawings, and computer input/output.

Distribution / Access refers to the management of information after it has been created or received, including internal and external distribution, as records that leave the organization document transactions with outside parties.

Use or Consumption occurs after internal distribution and involves applying information to support business decisions, document actions, or serve other organizational purposes.

Maintenance includes records management, which involves filing, retrieval, and transfer of information. Filing entails organizing data in a structured sequence and establishing a system to manage it throughout its useful life within the organization. Effective filing is crucial for efficient retrieval and usage, while poor filing practices can hinder access to information. The transfer process encompasses responding to requests, retrieving data from records, and granting access to authorized users.

Disposition is the process of handling information that is accessed infrequently or has reached the end of its retention period. Records used infrequently may be moved to an “inactive records facility” until they meet their retention limit. Although some information retains long-term value, most records lose relevance over time, with their highest value occurring shortly after creation. Records then transition from active to semi-active and eventually to inactive. Retention periods are set by an organization-specific retention schedule based on regulatory, statutory, and legal requirements, business needs, and historical or intrinsic value. Information should be appropriately disposed when it is no longer valuable to protect privacy and confidentiality.

Long-term records are those with ongoing value to an organization. Retention periods may extend to 25 years or longer, with some records designated as “indefinite” or “permanent.” However, due to the impracticality of such retention, “permanent” is a rare designation outside of federal agencies. Long-term records must be managed to ensure persistent accessibility, which is relatively straightforward with paper or microfilm but more challenging for electronic records. Electronic records require policies for format viability and media accessibility, as media can degrade or become obsolete. Regular conversion and migration of electronic records help maintain accessibility for required retention periods.

Exceptions to the typical life cycle occur with non-recurring issues outside routine operations. For example, when a legal hold, litigation hold, or legal freeze is required, a records manager places a legal hold within the records management system, preventing the affected files from being scheduled for disposition.

== See also ==
- Application retirement
- ARMA International
- Automated tiered storage
- Computer data storage
- Data classification (disambiguation)
- Data proliferation
- Digital asset management
- Digital continuity
- Digital preservation
- Document management
- Enterprise content management
- Hierarchical storage management
- Information governance
- Information repository
- Records management
