= Xerox DocuShare =

Content management system

- Company type: Business division of Xerox Corporation
- Industry: Enterprise Content Management; Document Management; Document Imaging
- Founded: 1997
- Headquarters: Norwalk, Connecticut, United States
- Key people: Jeremy Lukovich (Global VP Sales & Marketing)
- Products: Xerox DocuShare - Document Management Family of Solutions: DocuShare, DocuShare Flex, and DocuShare Go Platforms, & Digital Mail Solution
- Website: www.xerox.com/ecm

Xerox DocuShare is an enterprise content management software product developed by Xerox Corporation.

DocuShare has made updates to incorporate technologies such as artificial intelligence and intelligent document processing to automatically classify, extract, and route information from structured and unstructured documents.

== History ==
Xerox’s research centers originally developed Xerox DocuShare as an internal application (named AmberWeb).

Since its initial launch, DocuShare has added capabilities in workflow/business process management.

== Architecture and Features ==
=== Artificial Intelligence ===
In 2023, Xerox introduced AI features in DocuShare, including automated document data extraction, text summarization, and enhanced search. These capabilities aim to improve document processing efficiency and information retrieval.

=== Imaging ===
As of 2007, Xerox DocuShare had a front-end imaging component in Scan Cover Sheets, which uses proprietary DataGlyph technology.

=== Security ===
The UK government produced a detailed description of all aspects of DocuShare, including security and asset protection.

== Reception ==
A 2005 article in InfoWorld reported that DocuShare 4 was simple to use but still delivered solid document and file management.

== See also ==
- Business process management (BPM)
- Document imaging
- Document management
- Enterprise content management (ECM)
- List of content management systems (CMS)
- Records management
