= Archives and Records Association =

Organization

- Archives and Records Association
- Founded: 1 June 2010
- Type: Professional Organization
- Purpose: Archivists, Archive Conservators & Record Managers
- Location: Taunton, Somerset
- Origins: Merger of the National Council on Archives, Association of Chief Archivists in Local Government and the Society of Archivists
- Region served: UK and Ireland
- Method: Accreditation, Industry standards, Conferences, Publications
- Members: >2400 (2015)
- Employees: 4
- Website: http://www.archives.org.uk

The Archives and Records Association (ARA) is the principal professional body for archivists, archive conservators and records managers in the UK and Ireland. The Archives and Records Association (ARA, UK & Ireland) came into existence on 1 June 2010 and is the result of a merger of the National Council on Archives (NCA) and the Association of Chief Archivists in Local Government (ACALG) with the Society of Archivists (SoA). It is a member of the International Council on Archives.

== Aims ==
The principal aims of the ARA are: to promote the care and preservation of archives and the better administration of archive repositories; to advance the training of its members; and to encourage relevant research and publication. It achieves these aims through the work of its council and its various Committees, Groups and Regions, and through its role as the voice of the three professions. The association advises, submits evidence and makes comment on matters of professional concern to people or organisations whose activities affect archives and records.

== Membership ==
The association has over two thousand members, mainly made up of professional archivists, records managers, archive conservators and digital curators from all the different types of organisations that employ such professionals. Through an affiliate membership scheme, those who work at a paraprofessional level or who are generally interested in the work of the association and its members can join. There is also a student membership option for those who are studying for a professional qualification in archives, records management or archive conservation.

== Structure ==
The association is managed by a Council, which is partially elected every two years, along with a number of committees and sub-committees relating to specific areas of business.

The membership is divided into eleven regions that span the whole of the UK and Ireland, each with their own regional committee. The regional group covering Ireland (both the Republic and Northern Ireland) has a semi-autonomous status as the Archives and Records Association, Ireland.

Seven special interest groups also exist within the organisation's structure, representing members' different employment backgrounds and/or concerns.

The association has an office in Taunton, Somerset, which deals with the day-to-day administration of the organisation.

== Publications and outreach ==
A biannual publication entitled Archives and Records: The Journal of the Archives and Records Association, which covers professional issues, is produced for the association's members. The journal was previously known as the Journal of the Society of Archivists, and this title was retained until 2012: the current title was first used for volume 34, published in 2013. The association also publishes a monthly newsletter, called ARC Magazine (Archives, Records management, Conservation), and a fortnightly recruitment supplement called ARC Recruitment containing job and voluntary placement opportunities. Periodically more in depth guides on particular types of records or professional issues are produced and made available for members to purchase.

== Training ==
In terms of professional training for archives and records management, the ARA accredits externally provided postgraduate diploma/degree programmes, of which there are currently six; three in England and one each in Wales, Scotland and Ireland.

For Archive Conservation, the association runs a Certificate in Archive Conservation as an in-service scheme restricted to members only. It is also involved in the Professional Accreditation of Conservator-Restorers (PAC-R) scheme.

Other training events for members are organised by the Regional committees or Special Interest Groups of the association and co-ordinated by the association's Training Officer.

The association's Registration Scheme acts as a formal process of continued professional development. A register was first established in 1987, initially with a clause allowing professional members to be accepted automatically if they had been working in a recognised post for at least two years: this clause has now been closed and full completion of the present scheme, introduced in 1996, is now the only way to become a Registered Member of the association. Those who complete the registration scheme are entitled to use the post-nominals RMARA (Registered Member Archives and Records Association).

== See also ==
- Archives and Records Association, Ireland
- Information and Records Management Society
