= Master of Archives and Records Administration =

Master of Archives and Records Administration (MARA) degree (known internationally as a Master of Archives and Records Management and a Master of Archival Studies) is a master's degree that prepares students for careers as archivists, records managers, digital curators, or information professionals. Coursework focuses on the lifecycle management of information, from creation through disposition, and emphasizes the intersection between records and information management and business process trends such as a data mining and knowledge management.

The degree prepares graduates to take the Certified Archivist examination administered by the Academy of Certified Archivists. Under an agreement with the Institute of Certified Records Managers, graduates of the MARA program receive credit for parts 1-5 of the 6-part Certified Records Manager examination administered by the Institute of Certified Records Managers. If they meet the work experience requirement, they may immediately request designation as a Certified Records Analyst (CRA) or apply for part 6 of the examination in order to achieve the designation of Certified Records Manager (CRM). Graduates may also choose to take the Information Governance Professional certification examination offered by the Association of Records Managers and Administrators (ARMA International). There is currently no accreditation program for the MARA degree.

== Schools ==
The MARA degree is offered in the United States by the San Jose State University School of Information. No other master's degree dedicated to archival studies and records management is available in the United States, although archives and records management specializations and certificates are available through several Master of Library Science and Master of History programs.

Internationally, the Master of Archives and Records Management (MARM) degree is offered by the University of Botswana, the University of Liverpool, the University of Dundee, the University of West Indies, and the University College of Dublin. The Society of American Archivists (SAA) and ARMA International do not endorse any academic programs, but do maintain directory listings of archival and records management education. Both the SAA and the ARMA International provide guidance for the development of graduate archival programs and records management courses, respectively.
