= Executive Technologies =

Document management software company

Executive Technologies, Inc
- Company type: Private
- Industry: Software, Document management
- Founded: 1984
- Headquarters: Birmingham, Alabama, United States
- Products: SearchExpress Document Management
- Website: www.searchexpress.com

Executive Technologies, Inc. develops Enterprise Content Management, document management and document imaging software. The product is available for Cloud and on-premises use and uses Microsoft SQL for the document repository.

== Features ==
- SearchExpress provides capture, indexing, workflow, searching and document management and process automation for digital documents as well as paper documents.
- SearchExpress is used to provide a paperless office for small and large enterprises, including doctor's offices.
- SearchExpress includes a smartphone app for workflow approval, for example to approve AP invoices. There is also a smartphone app to capture documents, such as receipts.

== See also ==
- Document management
- Enterprise content management
- Paperless office
- Workflow application
- Document imaging
- Records management
