= Fabasoft eGov-Suite =

- Developer(s): Fabasoft
- Stable release: 2012
- Available in: German, English
- Type: Document management, workflow management, business process management, enterprise content management
- License: commercial
- Website: egov-suite.com

Fabasoft eGov-Suite is an application software product for document and records management for the public sector. For example, the software is used to implement eGovernment in the Federal Republic of Austria.

== Development ==
Fabasoft eGov Suite was developed by Fabasoft in Linz, Austria. The software seamlessly captures files, records and documents throughout their entire life cycle (Document Lifecycle Management, up to transactional online-service.

It is a general product specification which is supplemented by general or customer-specific requirements through partners in non-German speaking countries. Currently the product is used in Austria, Germany, Switzerland, Slovakia Portugal, the UK and Russia.

== Solutions ==
- Document Management
- Collaboration
- Online service
- Archiving
- Corporate-wide search
