= Fabasoft Folio Cloud =

Cloud computing service

Fabasoft Folio Cloud is a cloud computing service developed by Fabasoft in Linz, Austria announced in April 2010. It focuses on enabling secure collaboration and is web-based with iOS and Android apps for use on mobile devices. The software is object-oriented and offers a wide range of sophisticated functionality for document management and global collaboration, which can be extended by specialist cloud applications. Fabasoft places a large amount of focus on usability and accessibility.

== Security ==
Folio Cloud is certified and tested according to the following security standards : ISO 27001:2005, ISO 20000, ISO 9001, SAS 70 Type II. Fabasoft was also the first software manufacturer to receive MoReq2 certification – the European standard for records management.

All Folio Cloud data is saved in data centers in Europe, where European standards for security, reliability and data protection apply. Cloud data is kept permanently synchronized in two mirrored data centers in Austria so that a fail over is possible at any time. A backup of data is constantly maintained in a third data center. Further data center locations are being integrated in Germany and Switzerland and in future users will be able to decide at which data center location their data is stored.

Folio Cloud is based on open source and does not contain any US-owned software. This prevents access to European cloud data by US authorities under the “US Patriot Act”.

All communication and transfer of data within Folio Cloud is encrypted via SSL/TLS. Cloud access is protected by secure forms of authentication including two factor authentication with Motoky or SMS and login via digital ID. Folio Cloud has integrated the new German digital ID card, the Austrian Citizen Card with mobile signature and the SuisseID as forms of digital authentication. Fabasoft is active in the support of the advancement of European cloud infrastructure.

== Mobile cloud ==
Folio Cloud supports all common web browsers, different operating systems and end user devices. Folio Cloud apps are also available on Google Play and the Apple App Store for use on Android and iOS devices. Folio Cloud supports open standards such as WebDAV, CalDAV and CMIS.

== Apps ==
Apps are online applications that extend the functionality of Folio Cloud to fulfill concrete use cases and needs. All Folio Cloud Apps are available in the Fabasoft Cloud App Store.

Fabasoft held its first Cloud Developer Conference (CDC) from December 15–17, 2010 as a free event for Cloud developers. Since then the event has taken place twice a year, once in the summer and once in the winter.
