= Elcom =

Elcom may refer to:

- Elcom Credit Union, a credit union in Australia
- Elcom Technology, software company
- Electricity Commission of New South Wales, a statutory body responsible for the generation and distribution of electricity in New South Wales, Australia
