= Retention schedule =

A retention schedule is a listing of organizational information types, or series of information in a manner which facilitates the understanding and application of the identified and approved retention period, and other information retention aspects.

== Purpose ==
Retention schedules are an important aspect of records management. Many organizations are subject to rules and regulations (at the local, state or federal level) that govern for how long they are required to keep records before they can safely dispose of them. Holding onto records for longer than required can expose the organization to unnecessary liability, since such records are discoverable during lawsuits.

== Basic information ==
- Record/series title (name)
- Description of information within record/series
- Approved retention period
- Appropriate security requirements
- Appropriate destruction method

== Further items for schedule consideration ==
- Location of retention
- Date record type/series approved
- Responsible group/office/person(s) of record
- Remarks related to record/series
- Series number applied to a specific record/series

== See also ==
- Records management is the process of ensuring that in whatever form, records are maintained and managed economically, effectively and efficiently throughout their life cycle in the organization.
- Information governance is the protection of records from access by individuals that are not supposed to access the records.
