= ICRM =

ICRM may refer to:

- International Red Cross and Red Crescent Movement, an international humanitarian movement
- International Cliff Richard Movement, a fan club for English musician Cliff Richard
- Institute of Certified Records Managers, a certifying body in the Records Management and Information Governance industry
