= DIRKS =

DIRKS, an acronym for Designing and Implementing Recordkeeping Systems, is a comprehensive manual outlining the process for creating records management systems including various business information records and transactions as outlined in the Australian Standard for Records Management - AS ISO 15489. DIRKS was developed by the National Archives of Australia in collaboration with the State Records Authority of New South Wales.

The manual consists of two parts, part one is the user's guide and part two is the set of steps themselves. DIRKS is an eight-step process in which all aspects, or as many as possible, of a business are studied in order to achieve a complete records management practice. In addition to these eight steps DIRKS includes several templates and questionnaires to guide one through the DIRKS methodology.

DIRKS was replaced in 2007 at the Australian Commonwealth level, but continues to be in use at state level in New South Wales as a non-tool to assist the public sector in complying with the State Records Authority of New South Wales State Records Act 1998.

== Steps of the DIRKS methodology ==
- Step A: Preliminary investigation;

Before a preliminary investigation occurs DIRKS suggests a pre-preliminary investigation is performed where it is established if there is a need for a records management program at the organisation and is there support for a record keeping system to be put in place. If so the preliminary investigation can take place. There are four components to the DIRKS preliminary investigation.

1. Determine the scope of the preliminary investigation
2. Collect Information
3. Document the research of the investigation
4. Report to Senior Management
- Step B: Analysis of business activity;

The purpose of Step B is to create a set of advisory statements from which an analysis of the organisation's business activities can be determined. DIRKS suggests a set of systematic approaches to analyse an organization in a systematic way in order to reveal various business activities, how they are completed and who completes them.

- Step C: Identification of recordkeeping requirements;

Step C has two main objectives. The first is to determine an organisation's requirements in creation and retention of records of its business activities. The second objective is to document the determined requirements in a clear manner that can be used as a reference in the future.

- Step D: Assessment of existing systems;

The main objective of Step D is to assess the existing recordkeeping systems and any other related information management systems that have the capacity to capture and maintain records. This assessment is to identify weaknesses and strengths within the existing system.

- Step E: Identification of strategies for recordkeeping;

The main objective of Step E is to determine which policies, procedures, standards and various other tools will help the organisation achieve its recordkeeping goals. With these strategies established a model for both record management and recordkeeping can be created.

- Step F: Design of a recordkeeping system;

The objective in Step F is to use the information gained in steps A through E a plan can be developed that fulfills the requirements set out in Step C. The design should repair any faults found in Step D and include a full plan for integrating the new recordkeeping system

- Step G: Implementation of a recordkeeping system;

The objective of Step G is put the recordkeeping system that was designed in Step F in place.

- Step H: Post-implementation review.

The objective of Step H is to measure the effectiveness of the installed system and to make sure that in practice in fulfills all requirements as established and documented throughout the DIRKS manual.

== See also ==
- Australian Standards
- National Archives of Australia
- Records life-cycle
- Records management
- State Records Authority of New South Wales
