= The Elcom Platform =

The Elcom Platform is a web content management and intranet portal software written in Microsoft ASP.NET and SQL Server by Elcom Technology.

The latest version of the Elcom Platform is Version 11.5, released in December, 2020.

== History ==
Elcom was founded in 1996 by John Anstey. Elcom was originally involved in the development of the Australian Taxation Office's online e-tax platform before entering the content management market and releasing the first version of CommunityManager.NET.

In late 2010, Elcom expanded into the United States with an office in New York. and in August 2012 opened its second US office in San Francisco, California.

In 2011, the company rebranded CommunityManager.NET to elcomCMS.

== Market ==
Elcom targets mid-market organisations. Their clients include Hyundai and Austrade.

According to the company's website, Elcom was recognised in the 2010, 2011 and 2012 Gartner Magic Quadrant for Web Content Management report.

The company has also entered the document management market via connectors to systems such as HP Trim and SharePoint.
