= Scottish Council on Archives =

- Founded: 2002
- Purpose: Archives and Records Management
- Location: Edinburgh, Scotland
- Region served: Scotland
- Employees: 5
- Website: www.scottisharchives.org.uk

÷ The Scottish Council on Archives is an advocacy and development organisation for archive and records management services in Scotland. The council is Scottish Charitable Incorporated Organisation (SC044553).

== Projects ==
The Scottish Council on Archives (SCA) provides leadership and builds capacity for the archives and records management sector in Scotland. SCA works in partnership with many organisations throughout the UK to support and promote the management and use of archives services and collections. They run a busy programme of workshops and events and deliver projects and resources spanning engagement, education and advocacy.

SCA supports the work of professionals through the development and delivery of a variety of resources and tools covering issues such as quality improvement, accreditation, retention schedules, preservation, copyright and digital archives. Through its community archives programme it also help voluntary groups who maintain or wish to start a local archive.

SCA is a Scottish Charitable Incorporated Organisation (SC044553), and established and governed through a constitution.

The current chair is Kay Foubister. Its Honorary President is Dr Irene O’Brien. The Director is John Pelan.
