= EDRM =

EDRM is a four-letter initialism that can stand for:

- Electronic discovery reference model
- Enterprise digital rights management - a part of the security policy of Electronic Document and Records Management, however this is a secondary and much newer term and is infrequently used outside the United States
- Electronic document and records management
