= DLM =

DLM may refer to:

== Organizations ==
- Democratic Left Movement (Lebanon)
- Deutsche Liga für Menschenrechte, the German League for Human Rights
- Divine Light Mission, a religious organization founded in 1960 in India
- Division Légère Mécanique, WWII French military unit
- DLM AG, Dampflokomotiv- und Maschinenfabrik, Swiss steam locomotive manufacturer

== Technology ==
- Distributed lock manager in computer science
- DLM Forum, of European archivers
- Double-loop monocable, a type of ropeway technology
- Dynamic Line Management of ADSL telephone connection

== Other uses ==
- A song on James Blake's album Overgrown
- Dalaman Airport, Muğla, Turkey, IATA code
- Dalmatian language (ISO 639-3 code)
- Deca Loših Muzičara, Serbian rock band
- Dissemination Limiting Marker, Australian InfoSec term, see For Official Use Only#Australia
