= Society of Archivists =

The Society of Archivists (SoA), which was in existence from 1947 to 2010, was the principal professional body for archivists, archive conservators and records managers in the United Kingdom and Ireland. In 2010 the Society amalgamated with the National Council on Archives (NCA) and the Association of Chief Archivists in Local Government (ACALG) to become the Archives and Records Association (United Kingdom and Ireland), otherwise known as the ARA. Of the three bodies which merged, the Society was by far the largest, and many of its structures and activities were inherited by the new body with little obvious change.

== History ==
The Society was founded in 1947 as the Society of Local Archivists, but changed its name to the Society of Archivists in 1954 due to its membership expanding beyond archivists working in local government.

== Aims ==
The Society was constituted as a registered charity with the express aim to:

- Foster the care and preservation of archives in the public interest and to promote the better administration of archive repositories
- Advance the professional education and training of Archivists, Archive Conservators and Records Managers and those engaged in related activities
- Commission and support research into the creation, use, administration and conservation of archives and the development of new techniques and the publication of the useful results of such research.

== Membership ==
In 2010, the Society had over 2,000 members, mainly made up of professional archivists, records managers and archive conservators from all the different types of organisations that employ such professionals. Through an affiliate membership scheme, those who worked at a paraprofessional level or who were generally interested in the work of the Society and its members were also able to join. There was a student membership option for those who were studying for a professional qualification in archives, records management or archive conservation.

== Structure ==
The Society was governed by a Council (partially elected every two years), along with a number of committees and sub-committees relating to specific areas of business. The membership was divided geographically into eleven regions spanning the UK and Ireland, each with its own regional committee. Seven special interest groups also existed, representing members’ different employment backgrounds and/or concerns.

The Society had an office in Taunton, Somerset, which dealt with day-to-day administration. In 2010, this was taken over by the Archives and Records Association.

== Publications ==
The Society published a biannual publication entitled the Journal of the Society of Archivists, covering mainly professional issues. After the creation of the Archives and Records Association in 2010, the title remained Journal of the Society of Archivists until 2012 (volume 33); after which, from 2013, the journal was retitled the Archives and Records: The Journal of the Archives and Records Association.

The Society also published a monthly newsletter, ARC (Archives, Records Management, Conservation); and a fortnightly recruitment supplement called ARC Recruitment. Periodically more in depth guides on particular types of records or professional issues were published.

Manual of Archival Description

- Michael Cook & Kristina Grant Manual of Archival Description. London: Society of Archivists, 1984 ISBN 0902886223
- Margaret Procter & Michael Cook Manual of Archival Description; 2nd ed. Aldershot: Gower, 1989 ISBN 0566036347
- Margaret Procter & Michael Cook Manual of Archival Description; 3rd ed. Aldershot: Gower, 2000 ISBN 0566082586

== Training ==
In terms of professional training for archives and records management, the Society accredited externally provided postgraduate diploma/degree programmes. For some twenty years the Society itself ran a distance-learning Diploma in Archives Administration, but this was discontinued in 2001.

For archive conservation, the Society ran a Certificate in Archive Conservation as an in-service scheme restricted to Society members only. It was also involved in the Professional Accreditation of Conservator-Restorers (PAC-R) scheme.

Other training events for members were organised by the Regional committees or Special Interest Groups of the Society and co-ordinated by the Society's Training Officer.

Professional members were encouraged to participate in the Society's Registration Scheme, which acted as a formal process of continued professional development. A register was first established in 1987, initially with a clause allowing professional members to be accepted automatically if they had been working in a recognised post for at least two years. This clause was closed in 1996, and full completion of the scheme made the only way to become a Registered Member of the Society of Archivists (RMSA).
