= Alma K. Ledig =

American businesswoman

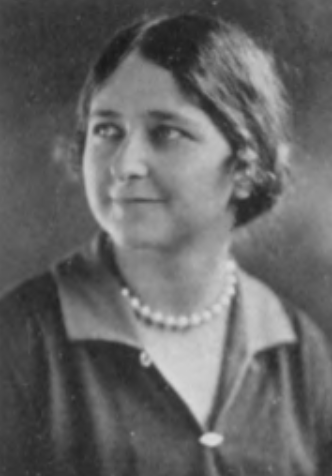
- Alma K. Ledig, from the 1926 women's yearbook of the University of Pennsylvania
- Born: July 26, 1905; Philadelphia, Pennsylvania
- Died: November 21, 1989 (age 84)
- Occupation(s): Businesswoman, records consultant; commander in WAVES during WWII

Alma Katherine Ledig (July 26, 1905 – November 21, 1989) was an American businesswoman and consultant on business records. In 1931, she became the first woman to earn a Master of Business Administration (MBA) degree from the Wharton School. From 1962 to 1963, she was president of the American Records Management Association.

== Early life and education ==
Ledig was born in Philadelphia, the daughter of Richard Gustav Ledig and Anna K. Mecky Ledig. Her father was a businessman. She attended Friends' Central School and graduated from the University of Pennsylvania in 1926. She continued her studies at the Wharton School, where she became the first woman to earn an MBA in 1931. For her research project she studied how salesgirls were hired and trained at department stores.

She was a competitive fencer during and after college. She won second place in the Pennsylvania women's foil competition in 1926, and won the women's épée event at the Pennsylvania state championship in 1928. She was state champion again in 1933.

== Career ==
After earning her MBA, Ledig worked for the Philadelphia Board of Education, in a job training and job placement program, and taught at Temple University. During World War II, she was a personnel officer in the United States Navy Reserve, where she held the rank of commander. She worked for the Navy Bureau of Ships in Washington, D.C. She also co-wrote a mystery novel, Cobwebs and Clues (1944) with her sister Ernestine.

Ledig lived in Chicago in the 1950s and 1960s. She was a records analyst and consultant at the Shaw-Walker Company, and was president of the Chicago chapter of the American Records Management Association (ARMA) from 1956 to 1958. In 1962 she was elected national president of ARMA. She was also a member of the Society of American Archivists.

== Publications ==
- Cobwebs and Clues (1944, with Ernestine Malan)
- Making More Money from your Real Estate Business (1955, with Warren G. Hirt and Robert S. Mather)
- "The Growing Importance of Records Management" (1963)

== Personal life ==
Ledig lived at Foulkeways, a Quaker retirement home in Gwynedd, Pennsylvania, in her later years. She died in 1989, at the age of 84.
