= Business record =

Document that records business activities

A business record is a document (hard copy or digital) that records an "act, condition, or event" related to business. Business records include meeting minutes, memoranda, employment contracts, and accounting source documents.

It must be retrievable at a later date so that the business dealings can be accurately reviewed as required. Since business is dependent upon confidence and trust, not only must the record be accurate and easily retrieved, but the processes surrounding its creation and retrieval must be perceived by customers and the business community to consistently deliver a full and accurate record with no gaps or additions.

== Retention ==
Most business records have specified retention periods based on legal requirements and/or internal company policies. This is important because in many countries (including the United States), many documents may be required by law to be disclosed to government regulatory agencies or to the general public. Likewise, they may be discoverable if the business is sued. Under the business records exception in the Federal Rules of Evidence, certain types of business records, particularly those made and kept with regularity, may be considered admissible in court despite containing hearsay.

== See also ==
- Records management
- Information governance
- Regulation Fair Disclosure
- Sarbanes-Oxley Act

== Resources ==
- ARMA International - Association of Records Managers and Administrators
- AIIM - Association for Information and Image Management
