= Paraprofessional educator =

Teaching-related position within a school

A paraprofessional educator, alternatively known as a paraeducator, para, instructional assistant, educational assistant, teacher's aide or classroom assistant, is a teaching-related position within a school generally responsible for specialized or concentrated assistance for students in elementary and secondary schools. Paraprofessional licensure requirements vary by locale.

== By country ==
Paraprofessionals are widely employed in schools in the United States and Canada, and in some European countries.

In the United States these educators have over 30 titles, but a recent national trend has encouraged states to title these positions as "paraeducators" under their various job positions (example: Support Staff>Paraeducator>Special Education).

In England and Wales, the term used for education paraprofessionals is Teaching Assistant (TA). In recent years, legislation has been introduced which enables teachers to delegate a range of tasks to their TAs. Teaching Assistants in England and Wales can apply for Higher Level Teaching Assistant (HLTA) status, which requires them to document the ways in which their work meets a set of specified criteria. Those with HLTA status can substitute for teachers and (where appropriate) supervise other TAs. Scotland uses the term "classroom assistant" rather than "teaching assistant" as teaching is strictly not part of an assistant's responsibilities there.

In Canada, they are widely known as Educational Assistants to emphasize their role in educating students in special education.

In Japan, foreign native speakers employed as paraprofessional language educators (primarily English) are known as Assistant Language Teachers. Similar institutions exist in Germany and France where they are known as Foreign Language Assistants.

== Duties ==
Paraprofessional educators generally assist teachers in the classroom, supervise students outside of the classroom, or provide administrative support for teaching. Job duties range from filling teaching positions to supplementing regular classroom curriculum with additional enrichment activities for students. Other positions include classroom aides, special education aides, school library technical assistants, and tutors.

Some paraprofessionals work directly with students, in which case they may listen to students practice reading aloud, help students understand and complete their assignments, or assist students with special needs.

Many paraprofessionals are assigned to supervise groups of students who are eating, playing outside, or on field trips. They may be assigned to perform clerical work for a teacher, in which case they may grade assignments, type up records for attendance or grades, set up equipment, and help prepare materials for instruction, e.g., by making photocopies of worksheets.

Many teacher assistants work primarily or exclusively with students who have special educational needs. Their duties vary according to the needs of the student, and may include physical care for students who are unable to care for themselves (such as feeding, lifting, moving, or cleaning), behavioral management, or academic assistance.

Some paraprofessionals don't work with the school directly, rather the school district, mental health agencies, early childhood programs or transitional life agencies after a student graduates. Paraprofessionals can work in other programs that the school district provides, such as school-aged childcare and recess or lunch duties. This links the paraprofessional to the students, but not the teacher or school itself.

The role of the paraprofessional educator has changed over time. Today, more than ever, paraprofessionals are working more on teaching lessons, working with small groups for remediation, leading clubs or sports, and have overall tended to take on more important roles.

== Requirements ==
Requirements to become a paraprofessional vary widely, normally ranging from a high school diploma, G.E.D., two years of college education, an associate degree, or a university degree depending on the circumstance. Some positions may require experience, particularly as an aide in an instructional role like in special education and in English as a Second Language instruction.

=== Regulation ===
In the United States, the No Child Left Behind federal legislation requires that educational paraprofessionals be "highly qualified". The definition of highly qualified is left to the individual states, as are the means for measuring qualification. The United States Department of Education has issued guidelines regarding paraprofessionals whose positions are funded under Title I of the federal legislation. According to the Department of Education, "Paraprofessionals who provide instructional support", include those who:

1. Provide one-on-one tutoring if such tutoring is scheduled at a time when a student would not otherwise receive instruction from a teacher,
2. Assist with classroom management, such as by organizing instructional materials,
3. Provide instructional assistance in a computer laboratory,
4. Conduct parental involvement activities,
5. Provide instructional support in a library or media center,
6. Act as a translator, or
7. Provide instructional support services under the direct supervision of a highly qualified teacher.

In 2015, The Every Student Succeeds Act was passed replacing No Child Left Behind. This gave more autonomy to the individual states and local school districts to make guidelines/standards that fit the needs of their particular demographics. It also created guidelines to provide great voice and support to paraeducators citing the need to adequately train, support, evaluate and include in decision making forums.

=== Certification ===
Some jurisdictions offer or require certification for some paraprofessionals. Others may require a contracted paraprofessional to pass an examination. Some require none of the above.

A paraprofessional certificate is typically a certificate that an educator has obtained by passing an exam enabling them to perform a task requiring extensive knowledge, but not requiring a college degree and teaching license. Subject areas could include any areas of education such as a GED Teacher, Alternate School Teacher, ISS Teacher, After School Tutor, Home School Teacher, Credit Recovery Teacher, Continuing Education Teacher, and any Special Education area which could be but is not limited to CML, tutoring, and providing any needs to an individual student.

=== Training ===
The training of and standards for paraprofessional educators varies widely by state and district. The Council for Exceptional Children (CEC) in collaboration with the National Paraeducator Resource Center (NPRC) has validated some guidelines for use in training paraeducators to serve "individuals with exceptionalities". Professional development companies, such as 321insight.com and PD360, provide targeted training to enhance paraeducator competency.

=== Salaries ===
According to the Bureau of Labor Statistics' records of Occupational Employment Statistics, teacher assistants earn a median salary of $26,970 (2018). Teacher assistants in Elementary and Secondary Education make an average of $29,180; childcare $24,570; Individual and Family services $27,070; and post secondary institutions range from $29,740–$34,090. The highest median income per state are Alaska ($39,640), Massachusetts ($35,680), California ($35,350), District of Columbia ($35,300) and Washington State ($35,130).

== Special education ==
Paraprofessional educators are frequently used to help support student/s in special education settings. Paraprofessional educators in these roles work with students with a variety of disabilities including learning disabilities, emotional disturbance, autism spectrum disorders, ADHD, schizophrenia, developmental disabilities, and communication disorders. Paraprofessional educators may work in special classrooms, resource rooms or serve as inclusion assistants who accompany individual students throughout their day. Paraprofessional educators in these roles may require specialized training in behavior management, de-escalation, personal-professional boundaries, and sometimes physical restraint.

== See also ==
- Assistant teacher
- Paraprofessional
- Student teacher
- Substitute teacher
- Teaching assistant
- College of Education
