= Electronic document and records management system =

Electronic document and records management system (EDRMS) is a type of content management system and refers to the combined technologies of document management and records management systems as an integrated system.

== Use ==
Typically, systems consider a document or file to be a work-in-progress until it has undergone review, approval, lock-down, and (potentially) publication, where it will wait to be used. The version of the form that is saved containing user content will become a formal record within the organization.

Once a document achieves the status of a record, the organization may apply best-practice or legally enforced retention policies which state how the second half of the record life-cycle will progress. This typically involves retention (and protection from change), until some events occur which relate to the record and which trigger the final disposition schedule to apply to the record. Eventually, typically at a set time after these events, the record undergoes destruction.

== EDRMS software ==
A range of software vendors offer these systems at an enterprise level (i.e. targeted at managing all documents and records within an enterprise).

These vendors have historically provided electronic document management systems and have acquired smaller records management system companies. The seamlessness of the integration and the original intention of the records-management component to manage electronic records typically sets the complexity of deploying and potentially of using the final system.

== Associated technologies ==
- Business process management (BPM)
- Case management and matter management
- Enterprise content management (ECM)
- Scanning
- Web content management (WCM)

== Professional organizations ==
Notable professional organizations for documents and records include:

- Association of Records Managers and Administrators (ARMA International)
- Institute of Certified Records Managers (ICRM)
- Information and Records Management Society (IRMS)
