= Fabasoft =

Fabasoft AG
- Type: public company (Aktiengesellschaft)
- Traded as: FWB: FAA
- ISIN: AT0000785407
- Industry: Software development
- Founded: 1988
- Founder: Helmut Fallmann; Leopold Bauernfeind
- Headquarters: Linz, Austria
- Key people: Helmut Fallmann; Oliver Albl; Matthias Wodniok
- Products: E-Government-Solutions; Enterprise content management-Solutions
- Revenue: €90 million (2025/26)
- Number of employees: 505 (2025/26)
- Website: www.fabasoft.com

Fabasoft AG is a software manufacturer headquartered in Linz, Upper Austria. The company was established in 1988 by Helmut Fallmann and Leopold Bauernfeind.

The name Fabasoft is an acronym of Fallmann Bauernfeind Software.

== Corporate data ==
The fiscal year of Fabasoft AG commences on April 1. Fabasoft AG stocks have been listed in the Prime Standard of the Frankfurt stock exchange since October 4, 1999. Fabasoft is certified according to the ISO 9001, ISO 20000, ISO 27001 and SAS 70 Type II. Fabasoft Cloud is also listed as compliant with the EU Cloud Code of Conduct, an approved GDPR Code of Conduct for Cloud Services, being the first company reaching Compliance Level 3.

Since 2012, Fabasoft is a participant in the United Nations Global Compact that commits CEOs to sustainability and broader UN-related goals.

== See also ==
- Fabasoft eGov-Suite
- Fabasoft Folio Cloud
