= Information and Records Management Society =

The IRMS (Information and Records Management Society) (formerly known as the Records Management Society) was founded in 1983 as the main professional body for records managers in Great Britain and Ireland. Its objectives are to strive to further knowledge of good governance in the management of information and records created during the course of the business activities of any organisation, whatever their media, and to promote fellowship and co-operation amongst individuals working in the field.

All those in any country concerned with records and information, regardless of their professional or organisational status or qualifications, can join the society, which currently has over 1100 members from 30 countries. There are specific interest groups for the public sector, third sector, SharePoint, property, financial and higher and further education, as well as geographical groups in Ireland, Scotland and Wales and the North, Midlands, London, and South West of England.

The society organises meetings and an annual conference, publishes the bi-monthly Record Management Bulletin containing comment, analysis, case studies and news from the UK and international information and records management scene, produces information guides on issues such as records retention and information technology, and runs training courses for members and non-members.

The society changed its name to the Information and Records Management Society in 2010. The society changed its name to the IRMS in 2014 along with its strap line from "The Home of Information and Records Management" to The Interactive Hub of the Information World.

== See also ==
- Archives and Records Association
- Archives and Records Association, Ireland
- Information governance
- Information management
- Records management
