= Metadata management =

Managing metadata about content data in digital media

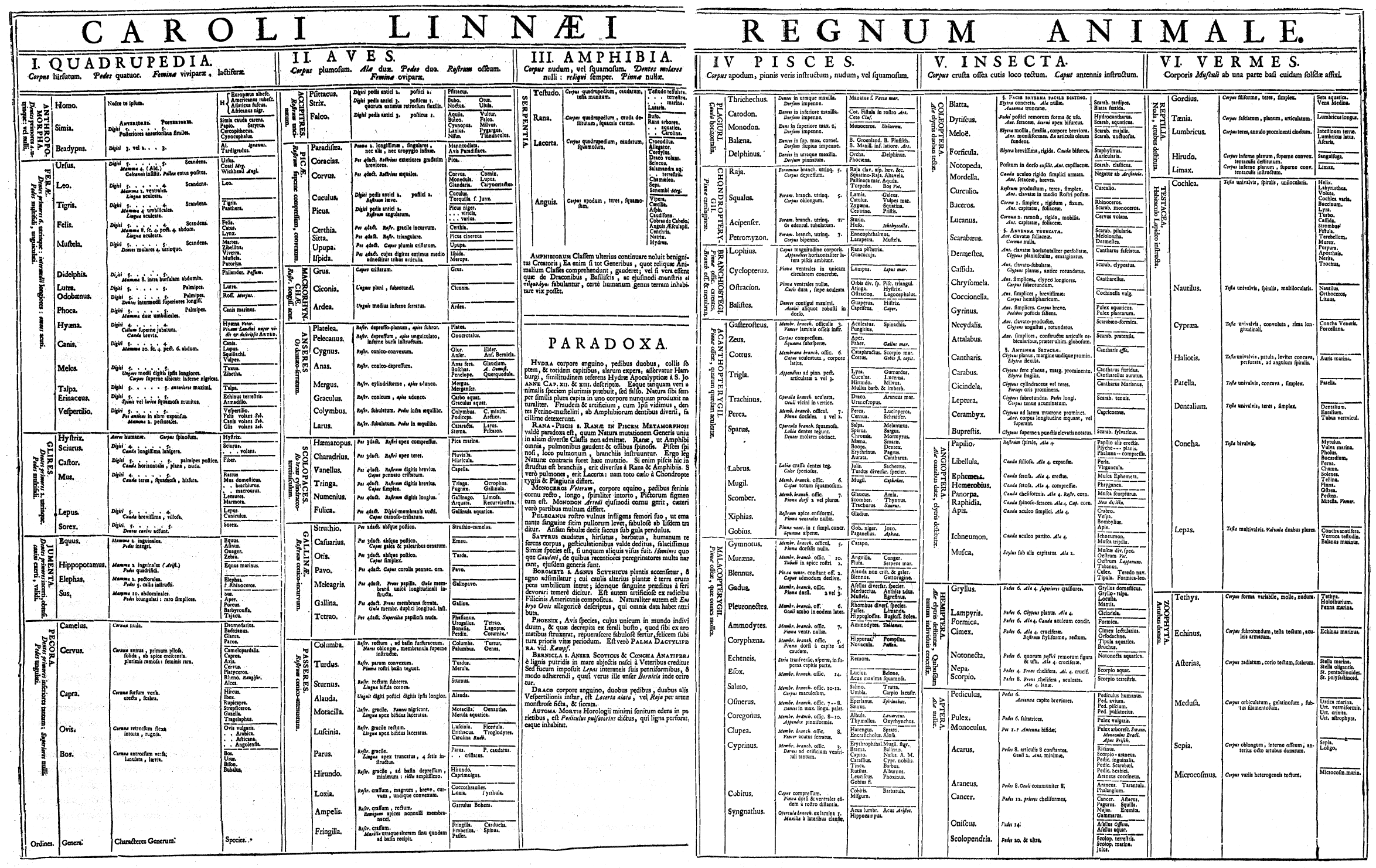
Linnaean taxonomy, a metadata system used historically for grouping animals in zoos, first published in 1735

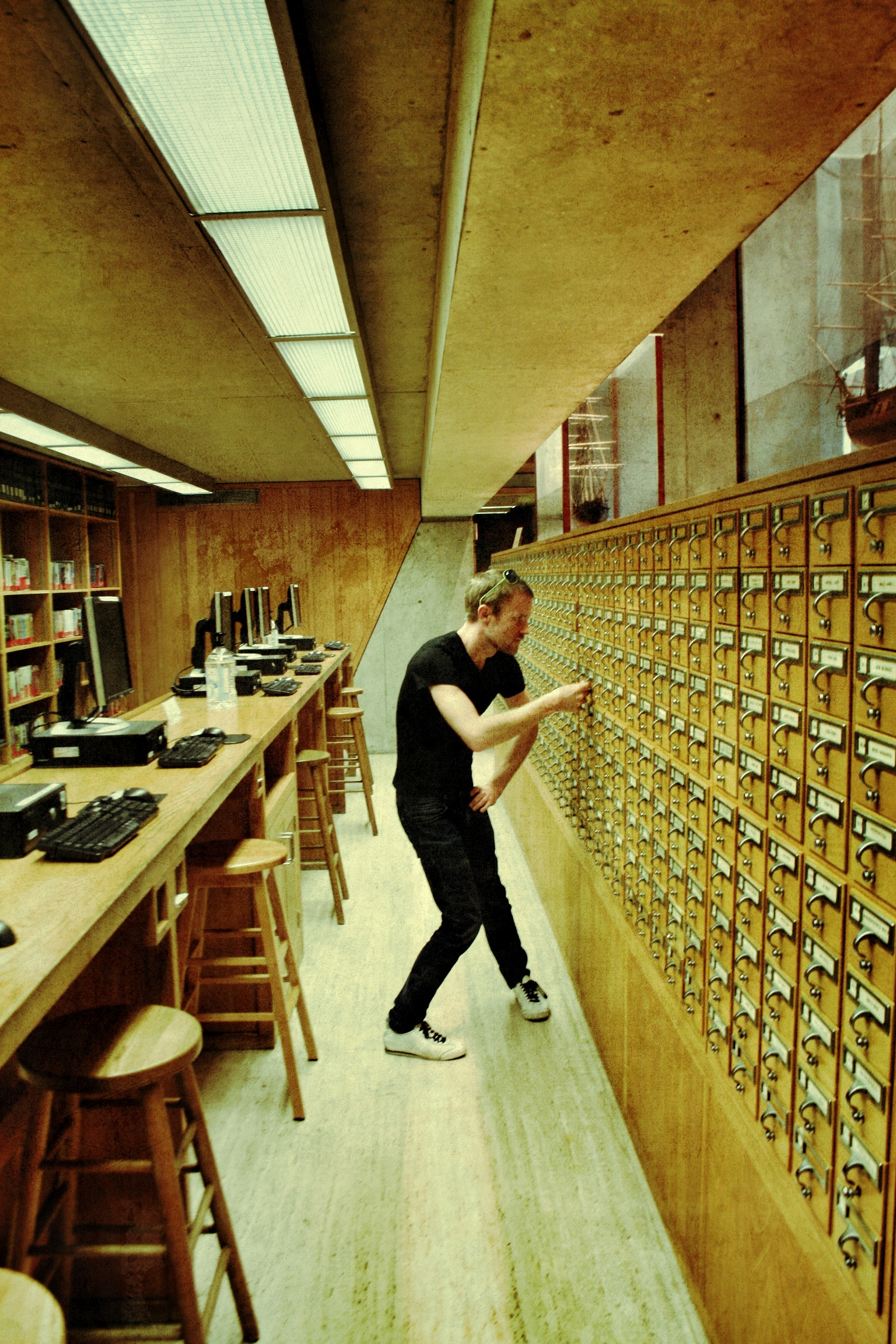
Card catalog and digital media access point

Metadata management involves managing metadata about other data, whereby this "other data" is generally referred to as content data. The term is used most often in relation to digital media, but older forms of metadata are catalogs, dictionaries, and taxonomies. For example, the Dewey Decimal Classification is a metadata management system developed in 1876 for libraries.

== Metadata schema ==
Metadata management goes by the end-to-end process and governance framework for creating, controlling, enhancing, attributing, defining and managing a metadata schema, model or other structured aggregation system, either independently or within a repository and the associated supporting processes (often to enable the management of content). For web-based systems, URLs, images, video etc. may be referenced from a triples table of object, attribute and value.

== Scope ==
With specific knowledge domains, the boundaries of the metadata for each must be managed, since a general ontology is not useful to experts in one field whose language is knowledge-domain specific.

== Metadata Manager ==
In the process of developing a knowledge management solution, creating a metadata schema, and a system in which metadata is managed, a dedicated resource may be appointed to maintain adherence to metadata standards as defined by data owners as well as general best practice. This person is responsible for curation of the business and technical layers of the metadata schema, and commonly involved with strategy and implementation. A metadata manager is not required to master all aspects, or be involved with everything concerning the solution, but an understanding of as much of the process as possible to ensure a relevant schema is developed.

== Metadata management over time ==
Managing the metadata in a knowledge management solution is an important step in a metadata strategy. It is part of the strategy to make sure that the metadata are complete, current and correct at any given time. Managing a metadata project is also about making sure that users of the system are aware of the possibilities allowed by a well-designed metadata system and how to maximize the benefits of metadata. Regularly monitoring the metadata to ensure that the schema remains relevant is advised.

=== Wikipedia metadata ===
Wikipedia is a project that actively manages metadata for its articles and files. For example, volunteer editors carefully curate new biographical articles based on the notability (claim to fame), name, birth, and/or death dates. Similarly, volunteer editors carefully curate new architectural articles based on name, municipality, or geo coordinates. When new articles with a valid alternate spelling are added to Wikipedia that match up to existing articles based on metadata, these are then manually checked and if needed, tagged for merging. When new articles are added that are considered out of scope or otherwise unfit for Wikipedia, these are nominated for deletion. To help keep track of metadata on Wikipedia, the new Wikimedia project Wikidata was established in 2012. Click on the pictures to view more metadata about these images:

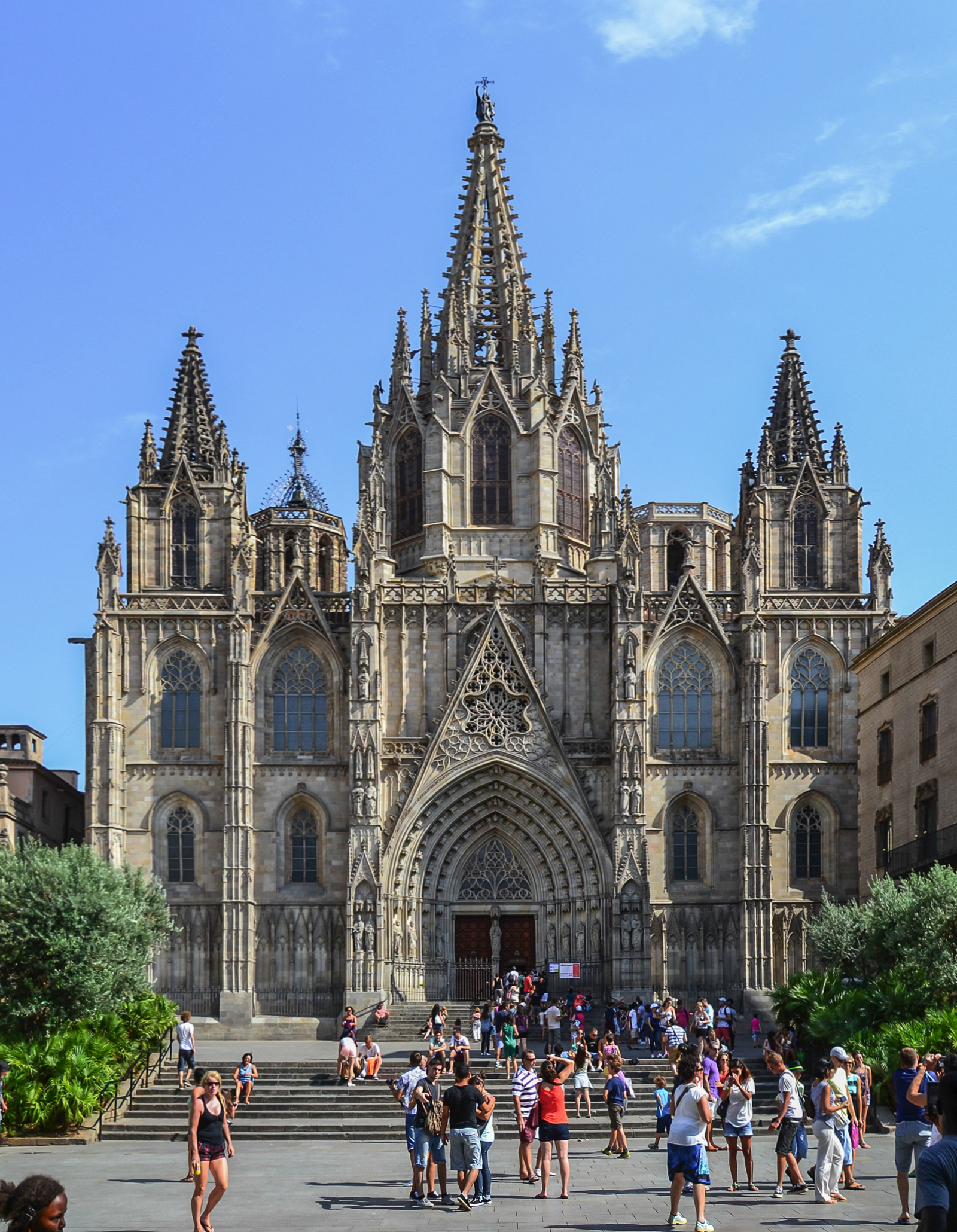
This picture of the Barcelona Cathedral was uploaded to the English Wikipedia in 2003 to illustrate its Wikipedia article, and was transferred to Wikimedia Commons in 2007 so it could be used in other language versions of Wikipedia.

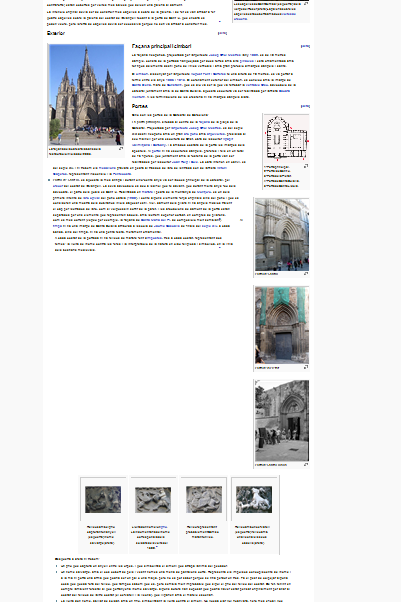
This screenprint of the Catalan Wikipedia page on the cathedral features several photos including this one. The screenprint was uploaded to Wikimedia Commons in 2007 soon after the photo was available there, but that article on the Catalan Wikipedia has since been expanded.

== See also ==
- Data defined storage – Marketing term for managing data by combining application, information and storage tiers
- Metadata discovery – Process of discovering semantics of data elements
- Metadata publishing
- Metadata registry – Central location to store metadata
- ISO/IEC 11179 – Standard for metadata registries
- Dublin core – Standardized set of metadata elements
