= Data defined storage =

Marketing term for managing data by combining application, information and storage tiers

Data defined storage (also referred to as a data centric approach) is a marketing term for managing, protecting, and realizing the value from data by combining application, information and storage tiers.

This is a process in which users, applications, and devices gain access to a repository of captured metadata that allows them to access, query and manipulate relevant data, transforming it into information while also establishing a flexible and scalable platform for storing the underlying data. The technology is said to abstract the data entirely from the storage, trying to provide fully transparent access for users.

== Core technology ==
Data defined storage explains information about metadata with an emphasis on the content, meaning and value of information over the media, type and location of data. Data-centric management enables organizations to adopt a single, unified approach to managing data across large, distributed locations, which includes the use of content and metadata indexing. The technology pillars include:

1. Media Independent Data Storage: Data defined storage removes media centric data storage boundaries within and across solid-state drive, hard disk drive, cloud storage and tape storage platforms, enables linear scale out functionality through a grid based Map Reduce architecture that leverages enterprise object storage technology, and provides transparent data access across globally distributed repositories for high volume storage performance.
2. Data Security & Identity Management: Data defined storage allows organizations to gain end-to-end identity management down to the individual user and device level to address growing enterprise mobility requirements and enhanced data security and information governance.
3. Distributed Metadata Repository: Data defined storage enables organizations to virtualize aggregate file systems into a single global namespace. During ingestion, the file, full text index, and custom metadata are collected and stored in a distributed metadata repository. This repository is then leveraged to enable speed and accuracy of search and discovery, and to extract value leading to informed business decisions and analytics.

Data defined storage focuses on the benefits of both object storage and software-defined storage technologies. However, object and software-defined storage can only be mapped to media independent data storage, which enables a media agnostic infrastructure - utilizing any type of storage, including low cost commodity storage to scale out to petabyte-level capacities. Data defined storage unifies all data repositories and exposes globally distributed stores through the global namespace, eliminating data silos and improving storage utilization.

== Usage ==
The first marketing campaign to use the term data defined storage was from the company Tarmin, for its product GridBank. The term may have been mentioned as early as 2013.

The term was used for object storage with open protocol access for file system virtualization, such as CIFS, NFS, FTP as well as REST APIs and other cloud protocols such as Amazon S3, CDMI and OpenStack.

== See also ==
- Big data analytics – Extremely large or complex datasets
- Block storage – Sequence of bits or bytes of a fixed size
- Cloud storage – Model of computer data storage
- Content-addressable storage – Type of data storage mechanism
- Enterprise search – Software for finding documents
- Information governance – Information management system
- Metadata management – Managing metadata about content data in digital media
- Object storage – Computer data storage architecture that manages data as objects
- Scale out storage – Ability of a system to handle an increasing amount of work
- Software defined storage – Type of computer data storage
