= Retention period =

Guideline for the amount of time that a record is kept

A retention period (associated with a retention schedule or retention program) is an aspect of records and information management (RIM) and the records life cycle that identifies the duration of time for which the information should be maintained or "retained", irrespective of format (paper, electronic, or other). Retention periods vary with different types of information, based on content and a variety of other factors, including internal organizational need, regulatory requirements for inspection or audit, legal statutes of limitation, involvement in litigation, and taxation and financial reporting needs, as well as other factors as defined by local, regional, state, national, and/or international governing entities.

Once an applicable retention period has elapsed for a given type or series of information, and all holds/moratoriums have been released, the information is typically destroyed using an approved and effective destruction method, which renders the information completely and irreversibly unusable via any means. Alternatively, it may be converted from one form to another (e.g. from paper to electronic), depending on the defined retention period per format. Information with historical value beyond its "usable value" may be accessioned to the custody of an archive organization for permanent or extended long-term preservation.

== Defensible disposition ==
Defensible disposition refers to the ability of an identified and applied retention period to effectively provide for the defense of the record, and its eventual destruction or accessioning when scrutinized within a court of law or by other review.

It is commonly advised by records and information management (RIM) professionals that any and all retention periods applied to organizational information should be reviewed and approved for use by competent legal counsel, which represents the organization, and is familiar with the specific business needs and legal and regulatory requirements of the organization. Additionally, a practical approach to information assessment/classification, proper documentation of the disposition program, strategic review of disposition policy over time for efficacy are required for proper defensible disposition.

== Guidance and education organizations ==
- ARMA International
- Information and Records Management Society
- filerskeepers records retention FAQ

== See also ==
- Retention schedule
