= Office camera =

An office camera is a digital camera device that performs tasks in offices such as document scanning, physical object imaging, video presentation and web conferencing. It is similar to the document camera, which is normally used on podiums in classrooms and meeting rooms for presentations.

An office camera typically has a compact form factor in order to be a commonplace desktop item. Commercial products, such as the HoverCam, can fit into pockets or briefcases, which makes them ideal for use on desktops or on-the-go. Generally, office cameras have least one high-resolution camera, which can be used in an "aerial" position to shoot video or still image pictures of documents or objects. In order to capture images with enough clarity, such cameras are expected to have high resolution, normally more than 2 megapixels at the minimum, and ideally produce distortion-free images for documents, even when the document contains fonts under 7-point size. A secondary camera, which captures video horizontally to include the presenter(s) of the document or the audience of a presentation, can be beneficial to the device as well.

Office cameras can be connected via USB 2.0 ports to a laptop or a desktop computer to function almost similarly as a web camera. Once connected this way, software applications, such as Skype or GoToMeeting, interface with an office camera in the same fashion as connecting with any Universal Virtual Computer device. At the same time, an office camera can have VGA or HDMI video output to a TV or video projector, so that it can serve as a video presentation tool. Capturing still images and recording video footage into a local storage on the device is also possible.

Applications of office cameras can include quick "scanning" of documents (which is an alternative to flatbed scanners), showing real-time video of product demos, serving as a video input device for a multiple party video conference with shared interactive whiteboard, capturing images for manufacturing and inventory management, a video testimony, form or invoice scanning and recognition, receipt capturing, expense and report generation.
