= MoReq2 =

MoReq2 is short for “Model Requirements for the Management of Electronic Records”, second version. It consists of a formal requirements specification for a generic electronic records management system, accompanied by testing documentation and related information. Published in 2008 by the European Commission, it is intended for use across the European Union, but can be used elsewhere. MoReq2 is generally considered a de facto standard in Europe but it does not have any formal status as a standard.

== Purpose ==
The MoReq2 specification is intended for users and suppliers of electronic records management systems and services, and educators. Its main intended usages are to serve as a basis for invitations to tender (also known as requests for proposal) and as a framework to guide development of new electronic records management systems. It can also be used to provide a basis for auditing existing electronic records management systems or services, and as a resource for academic or commercial trainers.

== Availability ==
All the components of MoReq2, as well as translations and Chapters Zero (see below), are free to download from the official MoReq website. They are also available from several other websites. The requirements specification is also available in paper form from the European Commission as ISBN 978-92-79-09772-0.

== History ==
The original MoReq was first conceived in the late 1990s by the DLM Forum (a European not-for-profit body), following the development and publication of US DoD 5015.2 by the United States Department of Defense. MoReq was intended to serve the same function as 5015.2, namely to describe a good electronic records management system; but whereas 5015.2 was designed specifically for the US defence community, MoReq was designed from the outset to be useful across the European Union and in any sector or industry. 5015.2 and MoReq therefore differ because the former is a standard that defines the mandatory behaviours of a system, whereas MoReq provides guidelines that define the capabilities of a good generic system – not all of which need be mandatory in a specific instance.

Development of the first version of MoReq was funded by the European Commission, and took place during 2000. MoReq was developed by a team of consultants supported by and Editorial Board of international experts. The resulting specification, frequently referred to (informally) as MoReq1, was published in 2001.

MoReq1 was received enthusiastically, being the subject of about a dozen translations and adaptations. However, its success was not accompanied by any form of governance or development; and there was no MoReq1 compliance testing programme. This prompted the DLM Forum to initiate the development of a major update, which was to become known as MoReq2.

Following the production of a scoping study report, the European Commission funded development of MoReq2. The development was once again performed by consultants, this time supported by panels of volunteer reviewers as well as by an Editorial Board of international experts. The panels were drawn from:

- suppliers of electronic records management system software;
- users and potential users of software;
- National Archives;
- professional bodies and trade associations.

The volunteer panellists were drawn from 35 countries, and over 100 contributed actively to the review process.

In March 2010, the DLM Forum signed a contract to develop a new version of MoReq, to be known as MoReq2010; this was published in mid-2011.

== Compliance testing ==
A compliance testing scheme was launched by the DLM Forum in Summer 2008. This scheme allows suppliers of electronic records management systems to submit their products for formal compliance testing. Suppliers can choose any testing centre accredited by the DLM Forum, and the results are applicable across Europe. Compliance testing requires that the core MoReq2 requirements are met; at the option of the supplier, requirements of any combination of 13 the optional modules. The first software product which has been MoReq2-certified is (Fabasoft Folio). It is at this time (June 2014) the only one worldwide.

== Key features ==
MoReq2 is designed specifically to be an evolutionary upgrade of MoReq1. In addition to specifying functional requirements for a good, generic, electronic records management system it includes:

- Non-functional requirements.
- 13 “optional modules”, each of which defines requirements for a set of features that are often required in tight integration to electronic records management, such as document management (thus providing the basis of a specification for an Electronic Document and Records Management System), fax, collaborative working environment, and content management.
- A metadata model that defines 345 metadata elements needed to support the functionality defined in the functional requirements.
- Testing documentation (test data, test conditions, expected results, instructions) to allow compliance testing.
- An XML schema consistent with the metadata model.
- Explanatory text, appendices and references.

In addition the MoReq2 structure allows for countries to develop country-specific, language-specific, or region-specific “Chapters Zero” that take account of linguistic differences, national and regional legislation, national standards etc.

== Governance ==
The DLM Forum has established a MoReq Governance Board to guide the future development of MoReq. The Board is charged with:

- Managing ongoing development of MoReq.
- Managing the compliance testing process.
- Promoting the use of MoReq2.
- Validating translations and Chapters Zero.
- Ensuring the name and logo of MoReq2 are not inappropriately used.

== See also ==
- Metadata standards
