= Micro Focus Content Manager =

Electronic documents and records management system

- Developer: OpenText
- Stable release: 24.3
- Type: Document and Records Management tool
- License: Proprietary
- Website: software.microfocus.com/en-us/products/enterprise-content-management/overview

OpenText Content Manager (formerly Micro Focus Content Manager, HP Content Manager, HP Records Manager, HP TRIM) is a proprietary electronic document and records management system (EDRMS).

== History ==
The software was owned by HP Software Division and based on technology from Hewlett-Packard's 2008 acquisition of TOWER Software.

In August 2013, HP announced that HP TRIM would be integrated into a unified platform called HP Records Manager 8.0.

In June 2016, HP Records Manager 8.0 was released as HP Content Manager 9. HP Content Manager is built on the code base of HP TRIM and includes capabilities from the Autonomy Records Manager and Autonomy Meridio. HP acquired Autonomy Corporation in 2011.

Hewlett Packard Enterprise sold its software division to Micro Focus of the UK in September 2016. Content Manager is now a part of Micro Focus since the transaction was closed in September 2017.

In January 2023, OpenText acquired Micro Focus.

== Functionality ==
Features include:

- Enterprise Records Management to manage physical and electronic content, including Microsoft Outlook and SharePoint
- Information Governance with real-time policy enforcement, compliance, supervision, and surveillance capabilities
- Compliance by using a single governance platform to apply retention and disposition rules automatically across all records
- eDiscovery Preparedness
- In Place Management of content; Security and Audit capabilities
- Certifications designed to the international standards of records management, ISO 15489: 2001, and elements of ISO16175
- Flexible Deployment options, including on-premises, cloud, hybrid or appliance deployments.

Content Manager is accessible from mobile platforms, including iOS, Android and Windows smartphones.

== HP TRIM Product Family ==
HP Records Manager is based on the code base of HP TRIM.

=== HP TRIM Base Package ===
In February 2010, HP released TRIM Version 7. HP described this release as adding the ability to "provide transparent, policy based records management and archiving for Microsoft SharePoint environments on a single platform". (This was replaced by Enterprise Software.) This was in addition to the product's capabilities of managing electronic records and physical records in one system and in the same way regardless of their type, format or source.

HP TRIM was licensed as a base system with additional optional modules. The base package functionality was delivered through either a rich client, web client or with the HP TRIM for SharePoint module. Users could access HP TRIM functionality via Microsoft SharePoint. The HP TRIM for SharePoint modules included one for archiving and one for records management.

HP TRIM base package modules included the HP TRIM Web Client, a browser interface that complies with US 508 Accessibility Guidelines and is verified to US DoD 5015.2 V3 baseline, certified, Privacy and FOI records, meaning the software meets mandatory functional requirements for use in the United States federal government.

Since 7.2 The Document Content Index was implemented using Autonomy IDOL engine for text indexing.

Other base modules included:

- Content Indexing
- WebDrawer for read-only access from the Internet
- Document Caching
- Transmittal/Communications for compiling a mail registry
- Annotate/Redaction allows TIFF images to be annotated with an ability to redact or blank out sensitive information.

The Guest Gateway module allowed for a "Guest User" account with security and access restrictions and logs of all guest-user actions. Kofax Xtension permitted images to be captured into HP TRIM directly from the Kofax Ascent Capture high-end scanning software. The LabelLink Xtension integrates with ColorBar Gold for printing of special color-coded file labels The Directory Synchronization model mapped HP TRIM users from any LDAP directory (such as Novell eDirectory).

=== Optional modules ===
In addition to the base TRIM package, HP offered a number of optional modules. They included:

- The HP TRIM Rendering module provided a fully automated process for storing both an original document and its renditions to a record
- The HP TRIM Web Content Management module managed website content and structure using a web browser
- The HP TRIM Space Management module defined a storage hierarchy model to organize content
- The HP TRIM for SharePoint Records Management module provided lifecycle records management of all SharePoint content including Web 2.0
- The HP TRIM for SharePoint Archive module let administrators set lifetime management policies for SharePoint and automatically archive entire sites with the ability to restore content when required.
- An SAP ArchiveLink integration module for SAP AG records management let both SAP and non-SAP users review information
- The HP TRIM VERS Rendition module allowed electronic records to be stored in Victorian Electronic Records Strategy (VERS) (Australian State of Victoria) format. (VERS, a special digital records format, records and preserves content regardless of the system that created it, such that content can be read and understood in the future. HP TRIM software is compliant with all specifications of the VERS standard.)

== Standards compliance ==
HP TRIM complies with:

- the international standard for records management, ISO 15489
- the US Department of Defense Security Standard DoD 5015.2 Chapters 2 (mandatory requirements), 3 (classified records), 4 (Privacy and Freedom of Information Acts)
- Major US and international standards.
- the International Organization for Standardization ISO_standards 15489-1:2001 Records Management—Part 1: General
- ISO/TR 15489-2:2001 Records Management—Part 2: Guidelines
- AS 4390-1996 Records Management
- ISO 2788:1986 Guidelines for the establishment and development of monolingual thesauri
- The National Archives (TNA) of the United Kingdom TNA 2002
- Victorian Electronic Records Strategy (VERS) Australia
