= Elcom Technology =

Software company

Elcom
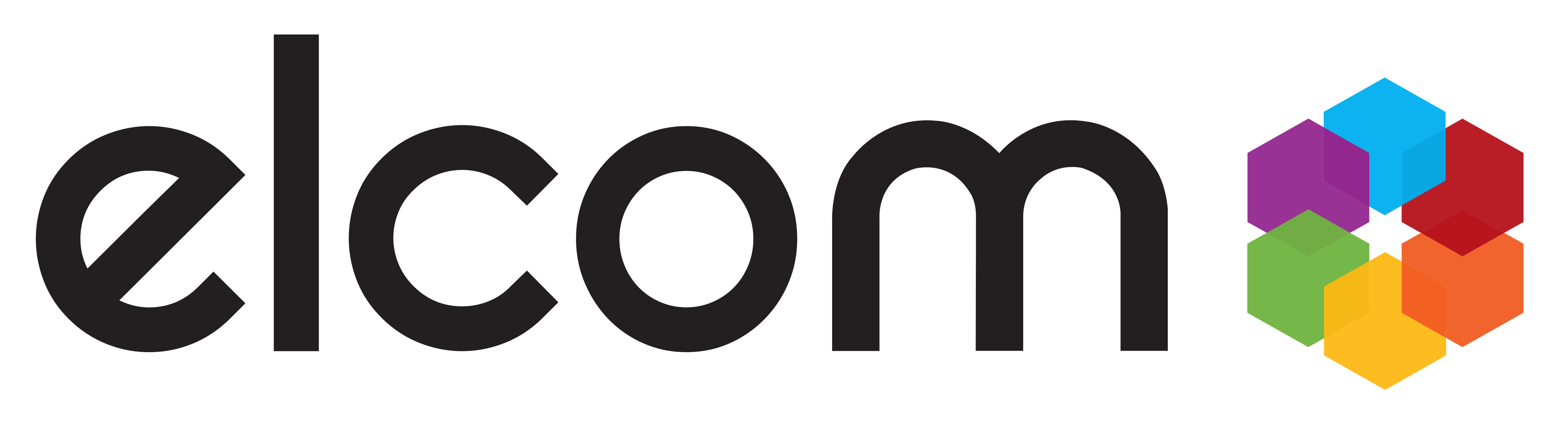
- Company type: Private
- Industry: Software
- Founded: Australia (1996)
- Headquarters: Sydney, Australia
- Key people: John Anstey, CEO
- Products: The Elcom Platform
- Website: www.elcom.com.au

Elcom Technology Pty Ltd is a privately held software company based in Sydney, Australia. It provides web content management, website, portal and intranet software. Elcom's primary product is elcomCMS which is built using Microsoft ASP.NET and Microsoft SQL Server. Version 11.5 of the CMS was released on February 15, 2021.

== History ==
Elcom was founded in 1996 by John Anstey. Elcom was originally involved in the development of the Australian Taxation Office's online e-tax platform before entering the content management market and releasing the first version of CommunityManager.NET.

In late 2010, Elcom expanded into the United States with an office in New York. and in August 2012 opened its second US office in San Francisco, California.

In 2011, the company rebranded CommunityManager.NET to elcomCMS.

== Market ==
Elcom targets mid-market organizations. Their clients include Hyundai and Austrade.

According to the company's website, Elcom was recognised in the 2010, 2011 and 2012 Gartner Magic Quadrant for Web Content Management report.

The company has also entered the document management market via connectors to systems such as HP Trim and SharePoint.
