= Records management taxonomy =

Records management taxonomy is the representation of data, upon which the classification of unstructured content is based, within an organization. It may manifest itself as metadata in structured database fields or in folder structures represented to end users from a user interface within a system. It is created to facilitate the correct records management policies within the organization, fulfilment of regulatory compliance, integration to operational and knowledge management systems and the search for information within the organization. It can be applied to physical and or electronic records.

Disciplines and or professions may create template taxonomies which are commonly used such as for Engineering and or Pharmaceutical Research. However, most organizations and or business functions within an organization may define taxonomies based on organizational requirements.
