= DLM Forum =

The DLM Forum is a European membership community of public archives and parties interested in archives, records and information management throughout the European Union. Membership is open to all. The Forum is known for its creation of the MoReq series of records management standards.

== History ==
The DLM Forum was established in 1994 by the European Commission. It is based on the conclusions of the European Council of 17 June 1994 concerning greater cooperation in the field of archives.

== Meaning of the DLM acronym ==
Originally DLM was an acronym for 'Données Lisibles par Machine' (machine-readable data). At its 2002 conference in Barcelona (Spain) a resolution was passed changing this, so DLM now stands for 'Document Lifecycle Management'.

== Objectives ==
According to its constitution (paragraph 3c), one of the DLM Forum's goals is: 'to provide technology and knowledge transfer and information services, appropriate practice guidelines, benchmark indicators and information, educational, skills development and research opportunities.' The constitution also defines (in paragraph 4) other objectives: '(a) To provide for information services (on-line information portal, list-serv, publications, discussions forum, news, dynamic document archive); (b) To provide for technology & knowledge transfer (technology watch, standards, legislation and policy monitoring, consultancy, connecting technology providers with users, partnership development); (c) To provide for education & skills development (conferences, seminars and exhibitions, workshops and training sessions, managed learning environments); (d) To provide for research (user needs analysis, economic modeling, ontology development, knowledge engineering, classification, information retrieval).'

== Achievements ==
The most visible achievement of the DLM Forum is the creation of a series of European records management standards, collectively known as "MoReq". The abbreviation 'MoReq' is a contraction of 'Model Requirements for the management of electronic records'.

The first MoReq requirements document, formally titled MoReq but today widely known (unofficially) as MoReq1, was published in 2001. MoReq rapidly gained acceptance across Europe and beyond. It has been translated into at least twelve languages, some of which are from outside the European Union. The enhanced successor document MoReq2 was published in 2008. Both documents have achieved the status of de facto standards, without the backing of any formal standards body. MoReq2 was enhanced by a test framework, a records management software certification programme, and an XML schema. In March 2010, the DLM Forum announced it had signed a contract with Journal IT for a major update to MoReq, to result in a version that will be called MoReq2010.

Other publications of the DLM Forum include 'Guidelines on best practices for using electronic information', seven DLM Whitepapers and Proceedings of the DLM-Forum Conferences.

== Membership and administration ==
Any person or organisation can apply to join the DLM Forum; membership is subject to payment of an annual fee. In 2015 there are 56 members, including national archives, consultancies, academic institutions, records management software vendors and end-user organisations.

Until 2010, the legal entity of the DLM Forum was the DLM Network EEIG. In early 2010, the DLM Forum formed the DLM Forum Foundation, a limited company registered in England and Wales, to replace the EEIG as its legal entity.

The DLM Forum is governed by its executive committee, which consists of 7 to 9 elected members. The current chair of the DLM Forum executive committee is Jan Dalsten Sørensen from the Danish National Archives. The DLM Forum established in 2008 a MoReq Governance Board for the maintenance and control of the MoReq2 standard and certification process.

The DLM Forum usually holds member meetings twice a year; generally these meetings are held in the country then holding the Presidency of the Council of the European Union. It also organises a major conference every three years; these conferences generally attract about 300 to 400 delegates from Europe and elsewhere. Recent conferences have been held in Barcelona (Spain), 2002, Budapest (Hungary), 2005, Toulouse (France), 2008, Brussels (Belgium), 2011 and Lisbon (Portugal), 2014.

Numerous papers such as the constitution, presentations from conferences and member meetings, translations and products are published on the DLM Forum website.
