= ISO 15489 =

Business record management standard

ISO 15489 Information and documentation—Records management is an international standard for the management of business records, consisting of two (2) parts: Part 1: Concepts and principles and Part 2: Guidelines. ISO 15489 is the first standard devoted specifically to records management; providing an outline for comprehensive assessment of full and partial records management programs.

== Topics covered ==
- Metadata for records
- Records systems
- Policies
- Records controls
- Monitoring of records
- Assigned responsibilities
- Recurrent analysis of business context
- Identification of records requirements
- Creation, capturing and managing of records
- Training supporting the effective management of records

== Related standards ==
The following standards have been developed by and are the direct responsibility of the ISO/TC 46/SC 11 Secretariat.

- ISO 13008:2012 – Information and documentation – Digital records conversion and migration process
- ISO/TR 13028:2010 – Information and documentation – Implementation guidelines for digitization of records
- ISO 15489-1:2016 – Information and documentation – Records management – Part 1: Concepts and principles
- ISO/TR 15489-2:2001 – Information and documentation – Records management – Part 2: Guidelines
- ISO 16175-1:2010 – Information and documentation – Principles and functional requirements for records in electronic office environments – Part 1: Overview and statement of principles
- ISO 16175-2:2011 – Information and documentation – Principles and functional requirements for records in electronic office environments – Part 2: Guidelines and functional requirements for digital records management systems
- ISO 16175-3:2010 – Information and documentation – Principles and functional requirements for records in electronic office environments – Part 3: Guidelines and functional requirements for records in business systems
- ISO/TR 17068:2012 – Information and documentation – Trusted third party repository for digital records
- ISO/TR 18128:2014 – Information and documentation – Risk assessment for records processes and systems
- ISO 22310:2006 – Information and documentation – Guidelines for standards drafters for stating records management requirements in standards
- ISO 23081-1:2006 – Information and documentation – Records management processes – Metadata for records – Part 1: Principles
- ISO 23081-2:2009 – Information and documentation – Managing metadata for records – Part 2: Conceptual and implementation issues
- ISO/TR 23081-3:2011 – Information and documentation – Managing metadata for records – Part 3: Self-assessment method
- ISO/TR 26122:2008 – Information and documentation – Work process analysis for records
- ISO 30300:2011 – Information and documentation – Management systems for records – Fundamentals and vocabulary
- ISO 30301:2011 – Information and documentation – Management systems for records – Requirements
- ISO 30302:2015 – Information and documentation – Management systems for records – Guidelines for implementation

== Usage ==
- Auditing
- ISO Annex SL, management clause 7.5 Documented Information

== See also ==
- Records management
- Information management
- Information governance
