= Records manager =

A records manager is the professional responsible for records management in an organization. This role has evolved over time and takes many forms, with many related areas of knowledge required for professional competency. Records managers are found in all types of organizations, including business, government, and nonprofit sectors. Generally, dedicated (i.e., full-time) records managers are found in larger organizations.

== History ==
Records management evolved from the development of archives in the United States government following World War II. With the explosion of paper records during that war, better systems of management were needed to retain and make the records available for current use. Records managers became specialists that bridged the gap between file clerks and archivists. The profession expanded into the corporate world in the 1950s.

== Competencies ==
The records manager generally provides expertise in records management, constituting knowledge areas of:

- Records creation and use
- Active and inactive records systems
- Records appraisal, retention and disposition
- Vital records identification and protection
- Records and information management technology

The Records Manager may also have subject matter expertise in:

- Law
- Privacy and data protection
- Information technology and electronic storage systems
- General business principles

== Specialization ==
Records managers are present in virtually every type of organization. The role can range from one of a file clerk to the chief information officer of an organization. Records managers may focus on operational responsibilities, design strategies and policies for maintaining and utilizing information, or combine elements of those jobs.

The health care industry has a very specialized view of records management. Health information management involves not only maintaining patient files, but also coding the files to reflect the diagnoses of the conditions suffered by patients. The American Health Information Management Association (AHIMA) is the professional organization in this space.

Records managers in the pharmaceutical industry are responsible for maintaining laboratory research, clinical trials data, and manufacturing information.

Records managers in law firms often have responsibility for managing conflicts, as well as managing client matter files.

In the United States, records managers in nuclear power plants specialize in compliance with the Nuclear Regulatory Commission rules regarding the handling of nuclear materials. NIRMA is their local professional organization.

== Education and certification ==
Records managers may have degrees in a wide variety of subjects in all disciplines, and few universities offer formal records management education. Graduate-level programs are often specialties within Library Science and Archival Science programs. Graduate-level Public History programs generally offer coursework in archives and records management. A recent addition to records management education in the United States is the MARA – the Master of Archives and Records Administration degree program — offered by the San Jose State University School of Information.

Professional and trade organizations offer continuing education conferences, seminars, and workshops. Governmental archives and records management departments such as the National Archives and Records Administration offer educational programs of interest to government records managers.

A professional certification, the Certified Records Manager credential is offered by the Institute of Certified Records Managers. Other organizations may offer certificates reflecting completion of a course of studies, attendance at a seminar, or passing a subject matter test.

== See also ==
- Records management
- Records management taxonomy
- Institute of Certified Records Managers
