= Institute of Certified Records Managers =

Institute of Certified Records Managers (ICRM)
- Established: 1975
- Focus: Records and Information Management
- President: Wendy Mclain, CRM
- Chair: Brice Sample, CRM
- Address: 230 Washington Avenue Extension, Suite 101 Albany, New York 12203-3539
- Location: Albany, New York, United States
- Website: www.icrm.org

The Institute of Certified Records Managers or ICRM is an international certifying organization of and for professional records and information managers. It is affiliated with ARMA International and the Nuclear Information and Records Management Association (NIRMA). It was incorporated in 1975 and is headquartered in Albany, New York.

The ICRM offers a six-part examination including sections focused on: Management Principles and the Records and Information (RIM) Program; Records and Information Creation and Use; Record Storage, Retrieval, Conversion, and Facilities; Records Appraisal, Retention, Protection and Disposition; and Technology. Part six (6) of the examination is a written exam consisting of case studies. Upon successful completion of which the applicant receives the designation of Certified Records Manager (CRM).

At the ARMA International Annual Conference and Expo in September 2016, the ICRM announced the creation of the Certified Records Analyst (CRA) designation. The CRA is a three-part examination including sections focused on: Records and Information Creation and Use; Record Storage, Retrieval, Conversion, and Facilities; and Records Appraisal, Retention, Protection and Disposition

== See also ==
- ARMA International
