= Document imaging =

Document imaging is an information technology category for systems capable of replicating documents commonly used in business. Document imaging systems can take many forms including microfilm, on demand printers, facsimile machines, copiers, multifunction printers, document scanners, computer output microfilm (COM) and archive writers. Document Imaging means the conversion of paper files (of any size or description) or microfilm / fiche to digital images.

== Transitioning to digital in the legal sector ==
The UK have been working slowly over the last decade to transition to digital processes. In 2013, the government launched an online claims portal to help keep track of and manage claims efficiently and quickly. Created to deal with claims of up to £25,000, the portal applies to organisations on the receiving end of employer liability and public liability claims. On May 31, 2021, a new separate system was launched called Official Injury Claim. This service deals with motor accidents and handles personal injury claims up to £5,000. Virtual hearings conducted over the telephone and video links are becoming more common practice, which is extremely useful in sensitive court cases. Over the recent years, partly driven by GDPR, many law firms have been forced to rethink the way they manage data. Paper case files and manual processes were still very much prevalent in the legal sector pre-Covid. The current crisis, though, has completely shifted the way law firms work; they have had to quickly adopt new ways of working. It has presented a window of opportunity for private law firms to review company structures and identify inefficiencies that have existed for years. The need for an efficient method of working was highlighted further during the lockdown when employees without electronic access to documentation struggled to work from home.

== Document management ==
Document imaging is a part of enterprise content management. In the early days of content management technologies, the term "document imaging" was used interchangeably with "document image management" as the industry tried to separate itself from the micrographic and reprographic technologies.

In the late 1980s, a new document management technology emerged: electronic document management. This technology was built around the need to manage and secure the escalating volume of electronic documents (spreadsheets, word-processing documents, PDFs, e-mails) generated in organizations.

== Identity document scanning ==
Customer identity document scanning and storage is used for the purpose of age verification, identifying barred members and identifying individuals to the authorities in the case of criminal incidents. They are typically used at nightclubs, casinos, music venues, and many entities governed under the US Customer Identification Program (CIP).

Systems used include Id Scan Biometrics's Scan Net and ID Vista products. Id Scan Biometrics system was developed by Tamlyn Thompson in 2005.

=== United Kingdom nightclubs ===
UK licensing authorities are increasingly requiring nightclubs to scan and retain clubbers' ID details. Privacy and data security concerns have been raised by customers and the protest group NO2ID. For example, Clubscan was an ID card scanning system invented in 2003. It took scanned images of nightclub patrons' ID documents and stored their personal details, for the purpose of age verification, identifying barred members and identifying individuals to the authorities in the case of criminal incidents. Clubscan is now discontinued and replaced by SCAN NET (the Safer Clubbing At Night Network) and serving over 1200 connected venues in the UK.

=== Proof of delivery (POD) ===
POD receipt can be generated into a digital image and full POD status report is generated into an excel spreadsheet. With e-retrieval of shipping documents, basic functions are dimensionalized, and administrative operations are streamlined.

== See also ==
- Document management system
- Image scanning
- Office camera
- Records management
