= Paraprofessional =

Occupational assistance title

Paraprofessional is a title given to individuals in various occupational fields, such as education, librarianship, healthcare, engineering, and law. Historically, paraprofessionals assisted the master professional of their field. In more recent times, paraprofessionals have become a professional in their own right, providing services which meet the needs of a particular recipient or community.

== Definition ==
The Greek prefix "para-" indicates beside or side by side (as in "parallel"); hence, a paraprofessional is one who works alongside a professional, while being a professional themselves.

== Examples ==
Paramedics in Canada, the United Kingdom, Australia, New Zealand and South Africa who autonomously practice paramedicine. Paramedics historically practised under the medical direction of physicians in these jurisdictions. With a lack of qualified physicians to practice in the field, paramedics themselves became responsible for emergency medical services in the pre-hospital setting. Paramedics, although now distinct provider, continue to rely on the research of emergency medicine which informs and contributes to their own unique practice.

Paralegals in the Province of Ontario who are licensed by the Law Society of Upper Canada to provide independent legal services to clients and the court. Paralegals, although now distinct providers, continue to rely on the research of law which informs and contributes to their own unique practice.

== Practice ==
The paraprofessional is able to perform tasks requiring significant knowledge in the field, and may even function independently of direct professional supervision. It is generally understood that paraprofessionals are the next most qualified professional after the master professional in their field. For example, physicians are allowed more independence than physician assistants; however physician assistants are more qualified than paramedics. Lawyers are allowed more independence than paralegals; however paralegals are more qualified than other legal professionals.

== Education ==
Some paraprofessional occupations require extensive education, testing and certification, especially in the areas of law and health. Others paraprofessionals require only a certain level of education or acquire education outside the professional norm, such as in librarianship. In some occupations, such as that of a paraeducator or paralibrarian, requirements for education and certification differ geographically.

== Historical role ==
Paraprofessionals were historically needed in the 1980s to assist during a shortage of professionally trained social welfare personnel. This aided in the widespread employment of the profession. Paraprofessionals have been proven to aid in crisis intervention at hospitals. Being able to assist more patients in a timely manner has beneficial long-term effects on those in need of medical attention. In the 1970s, New York utilized paraprofessionals in community mental health communities providing contributions deemed essential by professionals. Paraprofessionals are often used in times of need on the front lines of social welfare; some have limited or no training for their jobs, which raises the question of whether they are interim or needed long-term. Paraprofessionals are mainly employed in: teaching, social work, and counseling. The variety of tasks performed by a paraprofessional can be broad, ranging from routine maintenance to simple surgical procedures adding to the beneficial impact the profession can have on vast areas. Paraprofessionals are usually limited in schools, working in resource management, but when given the opportunity they can help students greatly through monitoring and tutoring. Despite being promoted in fields, paraprofessionals perform low-status function and occupy "the lowest level in the professional caste system" because of their informal or basic training. Paraprofessionals often deal with conflict in directions given, lower relational power dynamics, and less monetary satisfaction. Even after being hired, it is important that a paraprofessional continue their education to further their professional knowledge, skills and for job promotions.

== See also ==
- Paraeducator – Teaching-related position within a school
- Paralegal – Paraprofessional who assists qualified lawyers in their legal work
- Paramedic – Healthcare professional who works in emergency medical situations
- Physician assistant – Mid-level health care provider
- Professional – Person who is paid to undertake a specialized set of tasks
