= Design Criteria Standard for Electronic Records Management Software Applications =

United States Department of Defense standard 5015.2-STD, the Design Criteria Standard for Electronic Records Management Software Applications, was implemented in June 2002. This standard defines requirements for the management of records within the Department of Defense, which has become the accepted standard for many state, county, and local governments.

== History ==
The standard was developed in 1996 by a team led by Kenneth Thibodeau of the National Archives and Records Administration.As of 2016, only three companies are certified for records management at all levels for the Department of Defense: HP Enterprise (American), Feith Systems and Software (American), and Open Text (Canadian).

The following additional companies have some level of certification: IBM Corporation, Oracle USA, Gimmal LLC, EMC, Newgen Software, ZL Technologies, Perceptive, Laserfiche, Alfresco, Collabware, and Northrop Grumman.

== See also ==
- Records management
- Digital curation
- Archives
