= ARMA International =

International professional association for information governance

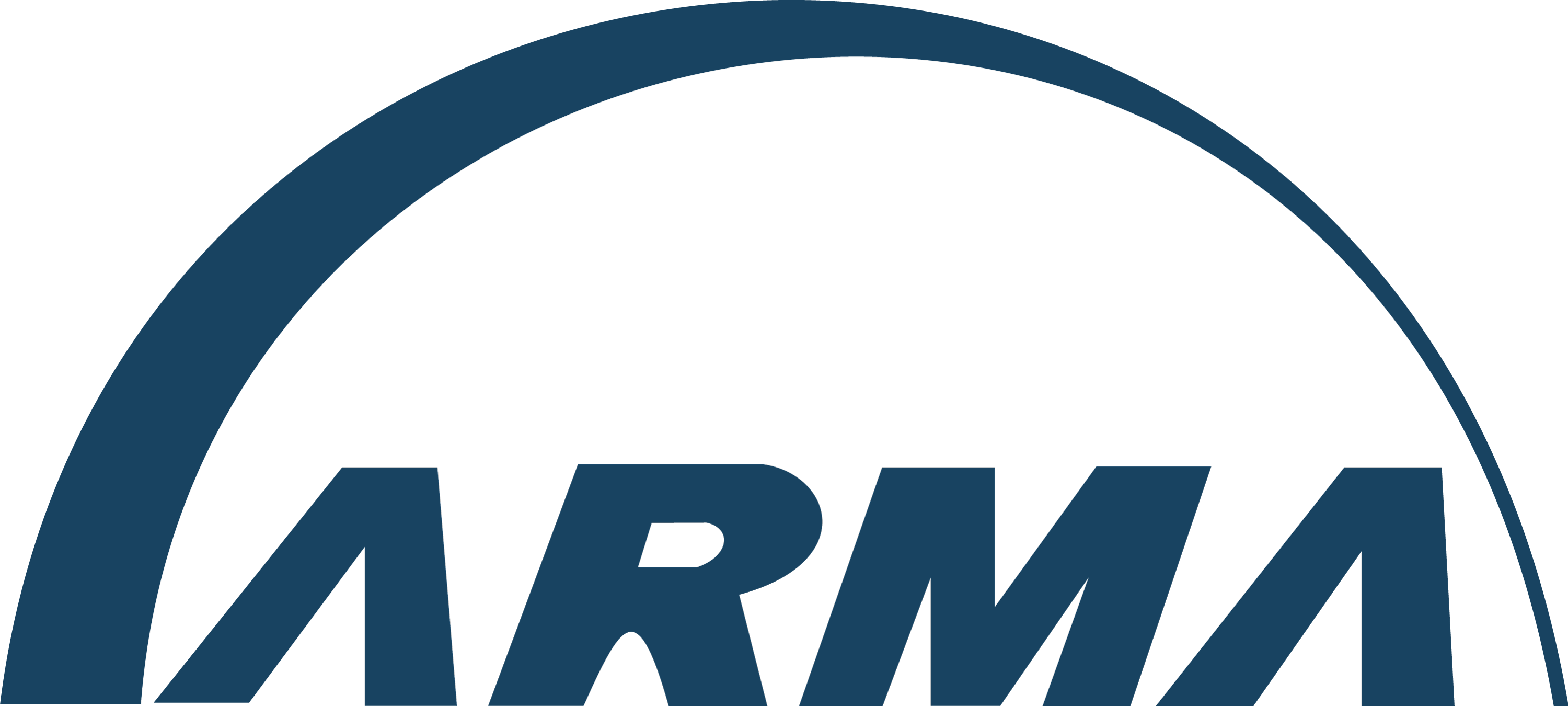
- Founded: 1955; 71 years ago
- Type: Professional association
- Purpose: Information Governance, Records Management
- Location: Overland Park, Kansas, United States
- Region served: Worldwide
- Method: Certification, Chapters, Conferences, Industry standards, Publications, Virtual Events, Webinars.
- Members: 6,000
- Employees: 12 employees
- Website: www.arma.org
- Formerly called: Association of Records Managers and Administrators

ARMA International (formerly the Association of Records Managers and Administrators) is an American not-for-profit professional association for information professionals – primarily information management (including records management) and information governance, and related industry practitioners and vendors. The association provides educational opportunities and publications covering aspects of information management broadly.

== History ==
The Association was founded in 1955. In 1975, the Association of Records Executives and Administrators (AREA) and the American Records Management Association merged to form ARMA International. The headquarters for ARMA International is located in Overland Park, Kansas.

== Operations ==
ARMA International services professionals in the United States, Canada, Japan, and the United Kingdom. Its members include records managers, attorneys, information technology professionals, consultants, and archivists involved in various aspects of managing records and information assets.

ARMA hosts an annual conference with the goal of bringing together record and information management professionals from around the world – In 2023, ARMA hosted conferences in both the United States and Canada. Topics addressed in the 120+ educational sessions include advanced technology, creating information structure, ediscovery and information law, information management fundamentals, information project management, and reducing organizational information risk. The expo features exhibitors displaying records and information technologies, products, and services.

== See also ==
- Generally Accepted Recordkeeping Principles
- Alma K. Ledig (ARMA president, 1962–1963)
