= List of Ripon College (Wisconsin) alumni =

Ripon College is a private liberal arts college in Ripon, Wisconsin. Following is a list of its notable alumni.

== Business ==
Name	Class	Major	Notability	References
Darell Hammond	1996		Founder and CEO of KaBOOM!	
Alan Klapmeier	1980	Physics and economics	Co-founder of Cirrus Design Corporation and former CEO of One Aviation Corporation	
Stephen Ng		Mathematics	Chairman and managing director of the Wharf (Holdings) Limited; chairman and CEO of i-Cable Communications	

== Clergy ==
Name	Class	Major	Notability	References
Harry Graham			Anglican priest	
Richard Kraft	1958		South African Anglican bishop	

== Education and academics ==
Name	Class	Major	Notability	References
Ryan C. Amacher	1966		President of the University of Texas at Arlington	
Theodore Brameld	1926	English	Philosopher, professor of educational theory, and a leading proponent of reconstructionism	
James Danky	1970	History and philosophy	Historian, bibliographer, culture critic, and faculty associate at the University of Wisconsin-Madison	
W. R. Davies	1915	Mathematics and philosophy	President of University of Wisconsin–Eau Claire 1941–1959	
Mark A. Greene		History and politics	Archivist and director of the American Heritage Center at the University of Wyoming	
Clifton F. Hodge	1882	BA	Professor of physiology at Clark University	
Bruno E. Jacob	1922	Economics	Professor at Ripon College in Wisconsin and a founder of National Forensic League	
William Chester Jordan	1969		Medievalist and professor of history at Princeton University	
Mabel Johnson Leland	1894	Music	Lecturer on Scandinavian literature and translator from Norwegian to English	
John L. Locke	1963	Speech communications	Biolinguist and professor of Language Science at Lehman College, the City University of New York	
Joseph Howard Mathews	non-degreed		Physical chemist, expert on firearm identification, and chair of the Department of Chemistry at the University of Wisconsin–Madison	
Joan Raymond	1957	History and psychology	Superintendent of the Houston Independent School District	
Michael Tinkham	1951		Physicist; Rumford Professor of Physics; Gordon McKay Research Professor of Applied Physics at Harvard University	
Oliver Williamson	1954	Economics	Economist, professor at the University of California, Berkeley, and recipient of the 2009 Nobel Memorial Prize in Economic Sciences	

== Entertainment ==
Name	Class	Major	Notability	References
Tom Bellfort	1967		Film sound editor and winner of an Academy Award and an Emmy Award	
Allen Cohen		BA	Composer	
Harrison Ford	1964	Philosophy	Academy Award-nominated actor and star of franchise film series Indiana Jones, Star Wars, Blade Runner and Jack Ryan	
Al Jarreau	1962	Psychology	Grammy Award-winning singer	
Frances Lee McCain	1966	Philosophy	Actress	
John Stephenson			Actor who worked primarily in voice-over roles	
McKey Sullivan			Fashion model most notable as the winner of the eleventh cycle of America's Next Top Model	
Richard Threlkeld	1959	History and political science	Correspondent with CBS News and ABC News	
Spencer Tracy	1924		Academy Award-winning actor	

== Law ==
Name	Class	Major	Notability	References
Douglas R. Cole	1986		United States district judge of the United States District Court for the Southern District of Ohio	
Michael Gableman	1988		Wisconsin Supreme Court	
David F. Simpson	non-degreed		Minnesota Supreme Court justice	
Harry G. Snyder	1960	History	Wisconsin State Assembly and Court of Appeals judge	
George Eaton Sutherland	1870		Wisconsin Senate and a judge of the Milwaukee Superior Court	
Jon P. Wilcox	1958		Wisconsin Supreme Court justice 1992–2007	

== Military ==
Name	Class	Major	Notability	References
Frank L. Anders	1906		Medal of Honor recipient	
Ernest J. Dawley	1908		United States Army general	
Harley Sanford Jones	1926	Philosophy	United States Air Force general	
Oscar Hugh La Grange			United States Army general	
James Megellas	1942		One of the most decorated combat officers in the history of the 82nd Airborne Division	
Ferdinand Louis Reichmuth	1905		Vice admiral of the United States Navy	

== Politics ==
Name	Class	Major	Notability	References
Sheryl Albers	1976	Art	Wisconsin State Assembly	
José Miguel Alemán	1978		Director of Multibank Inc.; politician in Panama: national undersecretary of government and justice (1991) and secretary of state (1999–2003)	
Clem Balanoff			Illinois House of Representatives and national political director for the Amalgamated Transit Union	
Whitman A. Barber	non-degreed		Wisconsin State Assembly	
Joseph H. Bottum	1877		South Dakota Senate	
Halbert W. Brooks			Wisconsin State Assembly	
Bill B. Bruhy	1936		Wisconsin State Assembly and mayor of Plymouth, Wisconsin	
Fremont C. Chamberlain			Michigan House of Representatives	
Dennis Conta	1962	BA	Politician and consultant	
Raymond Cox	non-degreed		Minnesota House of Representatives	
Willis E. Donley			Wisconsin State Assembly	
William F. Double			Wisconsin State Assembly	
Roderick Esquivel	1949		Former vice president of the Republic of Panama	
John A. Fridd			Wisconsin State Assembly and Wisconsin Senate	
Robb Kahl			Wisconsin State Assembly	
Lewis G. Kellogg			Wisconsin Senate	
Frederick W. Krez			Wisconsin State Assembly	
George Paul Miller			Wisconsin Senate	
Elmer A. Morse			United States House of Representatives	
Orville W. Mosher			Wisconsin Senate	
Maynard T. Parker			Wisconsin State Assembly	
Ingolf E. Rasmus			Wisconsin State Assembly	
Harry G. Snyder			Wisconsin State Assembly and Court of Appeals judge	
George Eaton Sutherland	1870		Wisconsin Senate and a judge of the Milwaukee Superior Court	
Samuel R. Webster			Wisconsin State Assembly	
Albert Clark Wedge			Minnesota House of Representatives and Minnesota Senate	
Robert Welch			Wisconsin Senate and Wisconsin State Assembly	
Lloyd Wescott			Chairman of the New Jersey State Board of Control of Institutions and Agencies	

== Science and technology ==
Name	Class	Major	Notability	References
Arthur John Ahearn	1923		Physicist and mass spectrometry researcher at Bell Labs	
Elda Emma Anderson	1922		Physicist and researcher	
Wells Cooke	1879	AB	Ornithologist	
William Frederick Meggers	1910		Physicist specialising in spectroscopy	
Cheryl Rofer	1963	Chemistry	Nuclear researcher at Los Alamos National Laboratory	
Michael Tinkham	1951		Superconductivity physicist	
Mary Curtis Wheeler	1890		Nursing educator	
Otto Julius Zobel	1918		Inventor of m-derived filter and Zobel network	

== Sports ==
Name	Class	Major	Notability	References
Jack Ankerson			Professional football player	
John Barth			American football and basketball player and coach	
Dick Bennett	1965		Head coach of University of Wisconsin-Green Bay Phoenix, Wisconsin Badgers, and Washington State Cougars men's basketball teams	
Tiny Croft			Professional football player	
Boob Darling			Professional football player	
Lon Darling			Professional basketball player	
Casey Finnegan			Head football coach at North Dakota Agricultural College (now North Dakota State University)	
George Glennie			Professional football player	
Tubby Howard			Professional football player	
Charlie Mathys			Professional football player with the Hammond Pros and the Green Bay Packers	
Madeo Molinari			Football, baseball, and golf coach at the Winona State University	
Billy Reed			Professional baseball player	
Dick Rehbein			NFL assistant coach	
Charles Rutkowski			Professional football player	
Ty Sabin			Professional basketball player	
Ted Scalissi			Professional football player	
Webb Schultz			Professional baseball player	
Champ Seibold			Professional football player for the Green Bay Packers and the Chicago Cardinals	
Wally Sieb			Professional football player	
Dave Smith			Professional football player	
John Swallen			Professional soccer player	
Joe Swetland			College football player and coach	
Cowboy Wheeler			Professional football player	

== Writing and journalism ==
Name	Class	Major	Notability	References
Emma Helen Blair	1872		Editor and translator most remembered for, the translation and editing of the 55-volume series The Philippine Islands, 1493–1898	
Sarah Powers Bradish			Writer best known for her textbook Old Norse Stories	
Scott Strazzante	1986		Photojournalist for the Chicago Tribune and the San Francisco Chronicle	
Gary G. Yerkey	1966	Philosophy	Journalist	
