= Mary Wheeler (disambiguation) =

Mary Wheeler (born 1938) is an American mathematician.

Mary Wheeler may also refer to:

- Mary C. Wheeler (1846–1920), American educator and artist
- Mary Curtis Wheeler (1869–1944), American nursing educator
- Mary Sparkes Wheeler (1835–1919), British-born American author, poet, and lecturer
