= Allen Cohen =

Allen Cohen may refer to:

- Allen Cohen (composer), American composer, conductor and university professor
- Allen Cohen (poet) (1940–2004), American poet

== See also ==
- Alan N. Cohen (1930–2004), American businessman, owner of basketball teams
- Alan Cohen (born 1954), American businessman, owner of ice hockey team
