= Iran nuclear deal framework =

Agreement reached in 2015 between Iran and world powers

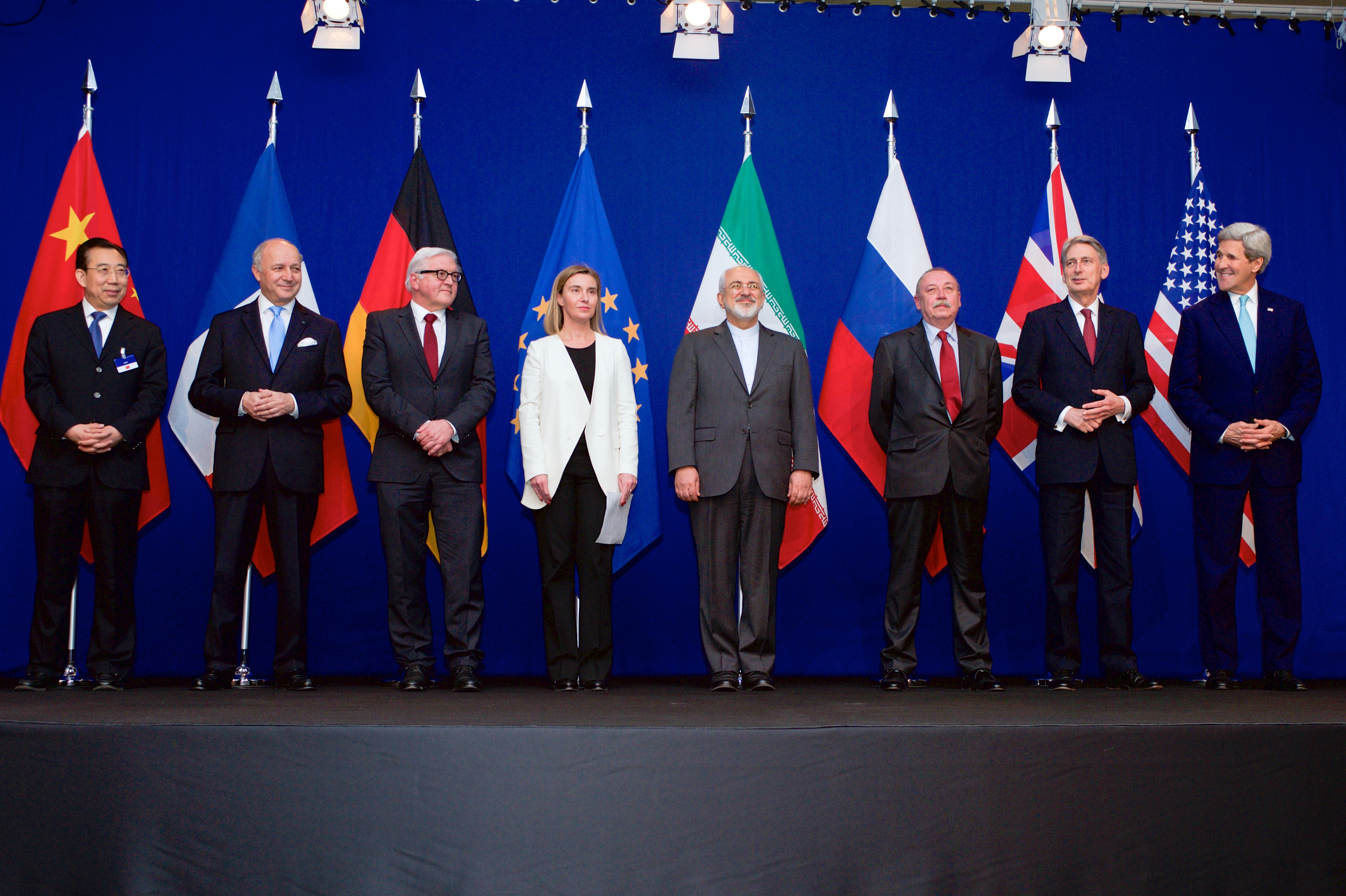
The ministers of foreign affairs of France, Germany, the European Union, Iran, the United Kingdom and the United States as well as Chinese and Russian diplomats announcing the framework for a comprehensive agreement on the Iranian nuclear program (Lausanne, April 2, 2015)

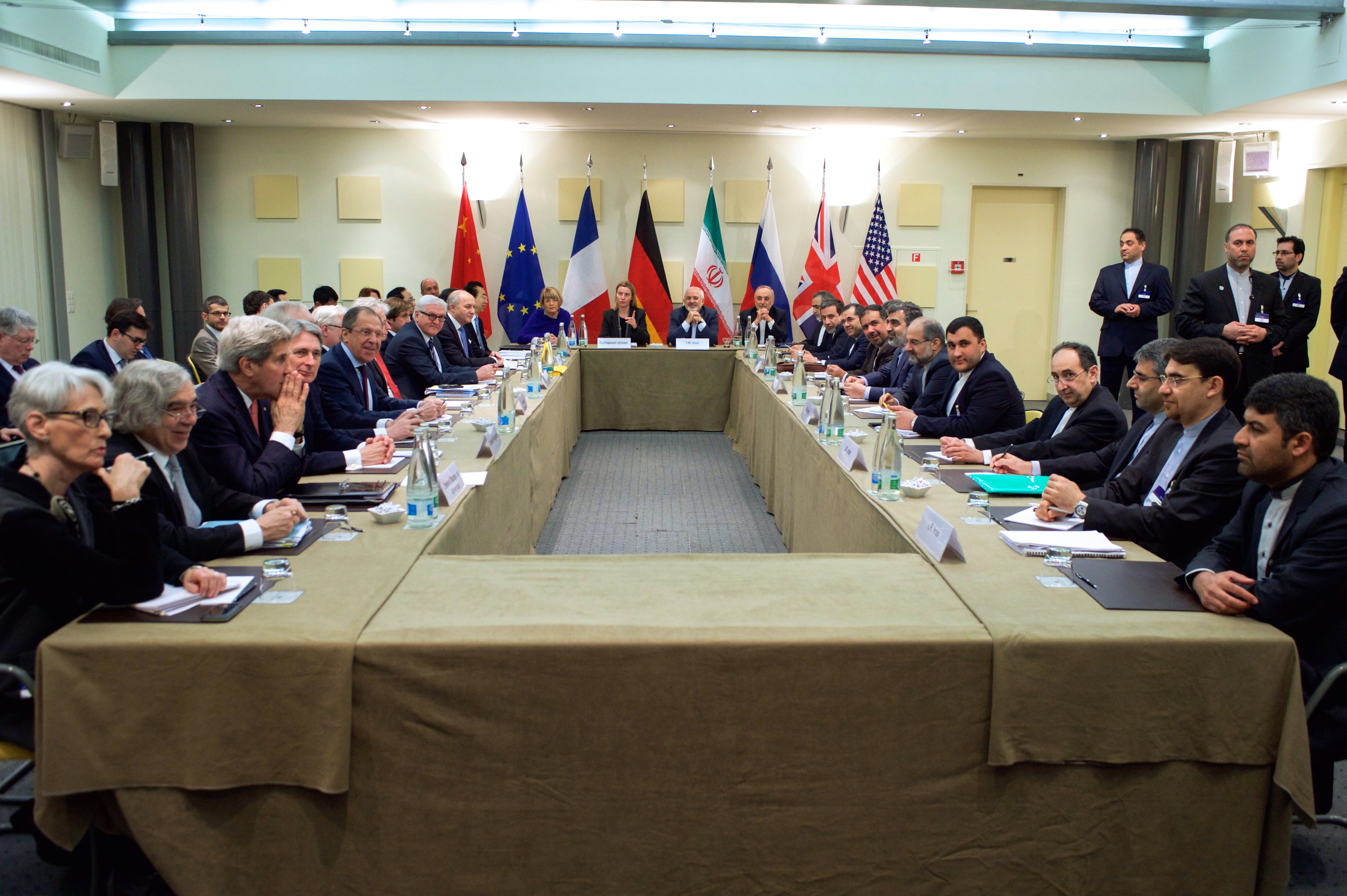
The ministers of foreign affairs of the United States, the United Kingdom, Russia, Germany, France, China, the European Union and Iran (Lausanne, March 30, 2015)

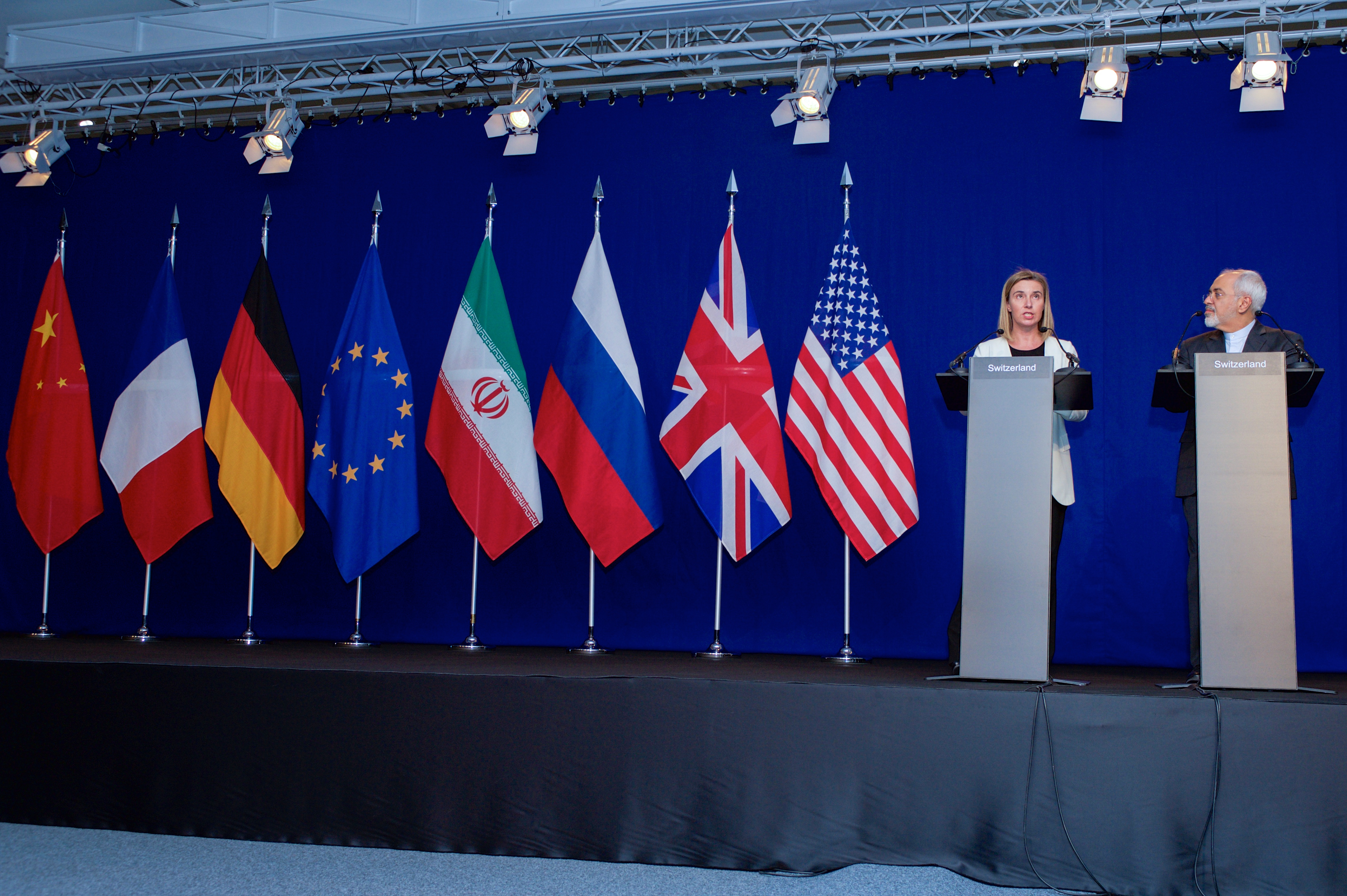
Federica Mogherini (High Representative of the Union for Foreign Affairs and Security Policy) and Mohammad Javad Zarif (Minister of Foreign Affairs of Iran) presenting the framework agreement after the multilateral negotiations in Lausanne (April 2, 2015)

The Iran nuclear deal framework was a preliminary framework agreement reached in 2015 between the Islamic Republic of Iran and a group of world powers: the P5+1 (the permanent members of the United Nations Security Council—the United States, the United Kingdom, Russia, France, and China—plus Germany) and the European Union.

Based on the April 2015 Iran nuclear deal framework, the Joint Comprehensive Plan of Action between Iran and the P5+1 and EU was announced on July 14, 2015 in Vienna.

== Background ==
Negotiations for a framework deal over the nuclear program of Iran took place between the foreign ministers of the countries at a series of meetings held from March 26 to April 2, 2015 in Lausanne, Switzerland. On April 2, the talks came to a conclusion and a press conference was held by Federica Mogherini (High Representative of the Union for Foreign Affairs and Security Policy) and Mohammad Javad Zarif (Minister of Foreign Affairs of Iran) to announce that the eight parties had reached an agreement on a framework deal. The parties announced, "Today, we have taken a decisive step: we have reached solutions on key parameters of a Joint Comprehensive Plan of Action," which they intended to complete by June 30. Announcing the framework, Foreign Minister Zarif stated: "No agreement has been reached so we do not have any obligation yet. Nobody has obligations now other than obligations that we already undertook under the Joint Plan of Action that we adopted in Geneva in November 2013."

The framework deal was embodied in a document published by the EU's European External Action Service titled Joint Statement by EU High Representative Federica Mogherini and Iranian Foreign Minister Javad Zarif Switzerland, and in a document published by the U.S. Department of State titled Parameters for a Joint Comprehensive Plan of Action Regarding the Islamic Republic of Iran's Nuclear Program.

== Agreement details ==
According to the joint statement in Switzerland, the P5+1 countries and Iran agreed on a framework for a deal. According to this framework, Iran would redesign, convert, and reduce its nuclear facilities and accept the Additional Protocol (with provisional application) in order to lift all nuclear-related economic sanctions, freeing up tens of billions of dollars in oil revenue and frozen assets. In addition to the joint statement, the United States and Iran issued fact sheets of their own.

=== The joint statement ===
The joint statement outlines the following:

==== Enrichment ====
- Iran's enrichment capacity, enrichment level and stockpile will be limited for specified durations.
- There will be no enrichment facilities other than Natanz.
- Iran is allowed to conduct research and development on centrifuges with an agreed scope and schedule.
- Fordo, the underground enrichment center, will be converted to a "nuclear, physics and technology centre".

==== Reprocessing ====
- The heavy water facility in Arak with help of international venture will be redesigned and modernized to "Heavy Water Research Reactor" with no weapon grade plutonium byproducts.
- The spent fuel will be exported, there will be no reprocessing.

==== Monitoring ====
- Implementation of the modified Code 3.1 and provisional application of the Additional Protocol.
- Iran agreed IAEA procedure which enhanced access by modern technologies to clarify past and present issues.

==== Sanctions ====
When the IAEA verifies Iran's implementation of its key nuclear commitments:

- The EU will terminate all nuclear-related economic sanctions.
- The United States will cease the application of all nuclear-related secondary economic and financial sanctions.
- The UN Security Council will endorse this agreement with a resolution which terminates all previous nuclear-related resolutions and incorporate certain restrictive measures for a mutually agreed period of time.

=== Other listed parameters and reactions by the United States and Iran ===
In addition to the final statement, both the United States and Iran have made public more detailed descriptions of their agreement. Officials of both sides acknowledge that they have different narratives on this draft. The U.S. government has published a fact sheet summarizing the main points of the deal. Shortly after it was published, top Iranian officials, including Supreme Leader Ali Khamenei and Defense Minister Hossein Dehghan , have disputed the document on key points which remain unresolved.

On 22 July 2015, Abbas Araghchi, Iran's deputy foreign minister who led the negotiations, made an announcement on state-controlled television that the recently reached nuclear deal with the world powers did not include limitations on Iran's weapons capabilities or missile power and that Tehran would keep arming its regional allies. "We have told them [the P5+1 world powers] in the negotiations that we will supply arms to anyone and anywhere necessary and will import weapons from anywhere we want and we have clarified this during the negotiations," Araghchi said.

In a speech the following Saturday, Supreme Leader Khamenei added, "Our policy will not change with regards to the arrogant US government."

==== Enrichment ====
According to details of the deal published by the US government, Iran's uranium stockpile will be reduced by 98% to 300 kg (660 lbs) for 15 years. The level of enrichment must also remain at 3.67%. Iran will retain no more than 6,104 out of almost 20,000 centrifuges it possesses. There are two uranium enrichment facilities in Iran—Natanz and Fordo. Under the Joint Comprehensive Plan of Action (JCPOA) agreed on 14 July, the Natanz facility will be limited to installing no more than 5,060 of the oldest and least efficient centrifuges for 10 years. At Fordo, no enrichment will be permitted for 15 years, and the underground facility will be converted into a nuclear, physics and technology centre. 1,044 centrifuges at the site will produce radioisotopes for use in medicine, agriculture, industry and science. This level of enrichment, 3.67%, would be enough just for peaceful and civil use to power parts of country and therefore is not sufficient for building a nuclear bomb.

According to press TV report based on Joint Comprehensive Plan of Action (JCPOA), Iran's extra centrifuges and the related infrastructure in the Natanz facility will be collected by the International Atomic Energy Agency (IAEA) in order to be replaced by new machines consistent with the allowed standards. Iran will be allowed to allocate the current stockpile of enriched materials for the purpose of producing nuclear fuel or swapping it with uranium in the international markets. These comprehensive solutions permit Iran to continue its enrichment program inside its territory and also allowed to continue its production of nuclear fuel for running its nuclear power plants.

==== Fordo ====
According to the U.S. State Department fact sheet and a joint statement by Iran and the EU, Iran has agreed to convert its underground Fordo facility into a research centre for nuclear science and physics and about half of the Fordo facility would be dedicated to advanced nuclear research and production of stable radioisotopes which have important applications in medicine, agriculture, industry and science. Furthermore, Iran would maintain no more than 1,044 centrifuges for this purpose.

==== Sanctions ====
According to Press TV, the implementation of JCPOA followed by lifting of all the UN Security Council sanctions as well as all economic and financial embargoes by the United States and the European Union imposed on Iran's banks, insurance, investment, and all other related services in different fields, including petrochemical, oil, gas and automobile industries will be immediately lifted all at once. However, according to the fact sheet which is published by the U.S. government, U.S. and EU nuclear-related sanctions will be suspended after the IAEA has verified the implementation of the key nuclear-related steps by Iran.

==== Inspections and transparency ====
Iran will be required to provide the International Atomic Energy Agency access to all of its declared facilities so that the agency can be assured of the peaceful nature of the nuclear program. According to details of the deal published by the U.S. government, IAEA inspectors would have access to all of the nuclear facilities including enrichment facilities, the supply chain that supports the nuclear program and uranium mines as well as continuous surveillance at uranium mills, centrifuge rotors and bellows production and storage facilities. Iran will be required to grant access to the IAEA to investigate suspicious sites or allegations of a covert enrichment facility, conversion facility, centrifuge production facility, or yellowcake production facility anywhere in the country. Iran will implement an agreed set of measures to address the IAEA's concerns regarding the Possible Military Dimensions (PMD) of its program.

According to the Iranian fact sheet, Iran will implement the Additional Protocol temporarily and voluntarily in line with its confidence-building measures and after that the protocol will be ratified in a time frame by the Iranian government and parliament (Majlis).

=== Summary of agreement ===
Parameters of prospective actions by P5+1
Lift all sanctions within 4 to 12 months of a final accord.
Develop a mechanism to restore old sanctions if Iran fails to comply as per IAEA reports and inspection.
The EU will remove energy and banking sanctions.
The United States will remove sanctions against domestic and foreign companies that do business with Iran.
All UN resolutions sanctioning Iran will be annulled.
All UN-related sanctions will be dismantled.

Parameters of prospective actions by Iran
Reduction in the number of installed centrifuges from 19,000 to 6,104 and only 5,060 of these enriching uranium for 10 years.
No enriched uranium above 3.67% purity (suitable for civil use and nuclear power generation only) for 15 years.
Reduce stockpile of enriched uranium from current 10,000 to not more than 300 kilograms 3.67 percent enrich uranium for 15 years.
For 15 years, Fordow uranium enrichment facility will operate not more than 1,000 centrifuges for research. 5,000 R-1 centrifuges will be running at Natanz. The remaining 13,000 centrifuges will be used as spare, as needed.
Arak facility will be modified so as to produce a minimal amount of plutonium but will remain a heavy-water reactor. This restriction is limited to 15 years.
Allow inspection of all its nuclear facilities and its supply chains such as uranium mining sites .

== International reactions ==
=== International organization ===
United Nations – Ban Ki-moon, the Secretary-General of the United Nations, welcomed this agreement. "A comprehensive, negotiated solution to the Iranian nuclear issue will contribute to peace and stability in the region." he said.

– Yukiya Amano, the Director-General of the International Atomic Energy Agency (IAEA), with the release a manifest welcomed the compromise. "The IAEA welcomes the announcement by E3+3 [the 5+1 group] and Iran on the key parameters for a joint Comprehensive Plan of Action," Amano said in his manifest.

=== Governments ===
Germany – German Chancellor Angela Merkel pointed out that the agreement reflected well on negotiating partners.

Holy See – Pope Francis praised the deal in his Easter Urbi et Orbi blessing message on Sunday, 5 April 2015, saying: "... At the same time, in hope we entrust to the merciful Lord the framework recently agreed to in Lausanne, that it may be a definitive step toward a more secure and fraternal world. ..."

Iran – Iran's President Hassan Rouhani welcomed the development on Twitter. He said the nuclear agreement is just a step toward interaction with the world and all those countries that want to respect the Iranian nation. One week after Lausanne negotiations, Iran's Supreme Leader, Ali Khamenei, explained his idea about the negotiations. He neither accepted nor rejected the framework deal and stated that: "nothing has happened yet." About sanctions, he proclaimed all sanctions must be completely lifted on the day when the nuclear deal is signed.

Israel – Israeli Prime Minister Benjamin Netanyahu strongly opposed the framework and claims that the current plan of action threatens the survival of Israel. He also wrote that "Such a deal would not block Iran’s path to the bomb. It would pave it." Benjamin Netanyahu demanded that any final deal include a "clear and unambiguous Iranian recognition of Israel's right to exist," and that Iran stop its aggression in the region.

Italy – Italian Foreign Minister Paolo Gentiloni said that the agreement could have positive consequences and effects both with Iran and also for developments in other crisis areas.

Oman – Omani Minister Responsible for Foreign Affairs Yusuf bin Alawi bin Abdullah welcomed the framework deal between the Group 5+1 framework deal with Iran on its nuclear program, describing it "an historic agreement". He urged all sides to work out a final agreement before the 30 June deadline.

Pakistan – The spokeswoman of foreign ministry of Pakistan, hoped that the negotiations between Iran and the six world powers would come to a favorable result.

Russia – Sergey Lavrov Foreign Minister of Russia considered this agreement a positive development in the security of the Middle East.

Saudi Arabia – the Saudi Press Agency reported King Salman bin Abdulaziz Al Saud was cautious but "expressed his hope that reaching a final binding deal would strengthen the stability and security of the region and the world."

South Korea – welcomed this framework for a nuclear deal.

Turkey – Ministry of Foreign Affairs welcomed the nuclear deal and stated that Turkey had actively supported the processes for a peaceful solution through dialogue and had contributed to them through finalising of the Tehran Joint Declaration in 2010.

United Kingdom – Foreign Secretary Philip Hammond said that the framework agreement with Iran was well beyond what many thought possible even 18 months earlier.

United States – President Barack Obama said a "historic understanding" had been reached with Iran, and pointed out that the deal with Iran is a good deal if the deal could meet core objectives of the United States. 150 Democratic House members signaled that they supported reaching a deal, enough to sustain a Presidential Veto. A majority of Congress including all Republicans and some Democrats opposed the deal.

=== Non-state actors ===
PDKI – In September 2016, PDKI released a statement that their return to militancy was motivated by Iran's nuclear deal.

== See also ==
- Joint Comprehensive Plan of Action (- 2015 agreement on Iran's nuclear program)
- Nuclear program of Iran
- Timeline of the nuclear program of Iran
- Views on the nuclear program of Iran
- Iran Nuclear Talks Debate
- P5+1
- Economy of Iran
