= Views on the nuclear program of Iran =

Contentious geopolitical issue

Views on the nuclear program of Iran vary greatly, as the nuclear program of Iran is a very contentious geopolitical issue. Uriel Abulof identifies five possible rationales behind Iran's nuclear policy: (i) Economy, mainly energy needs; (ii) Identity politics, pride and prestige; (iii) Deterrence of foreign intervention; (iv) Compellence to boost regional influence; and (v) Domestic politics, mitigating, through 'nuclear diversion' the regime's domestic crisis of legitimacy. Below are considerations of the Iranian nuclear program from various perspectives.

== Iran ==
In taking a stance that the Shah of Iran expressed decades ago in 1968, Iranians feel the country's valuable petroleum should be used for high-value products, not simple electricity generation. "Petroleum is a noble material, much too valuable to burn.... We envision producing, as soon as possible, 23,000 megawatts of electricity using nuclear plants," the Shah had previously said. Assuming pumping rates remain steady, it was estimated in 2008 that Iran had only enough oil to last "another 75 years or so". Iran also faces financial constraints, and claims that developing the excess capacity in its oil industry would cost it $40 billion, excluding the cost of building the power plants. Roger Stern from Johns Hopkins University partially concurred with this view, projecting in 2006 that due to "energy subsidies, hostility to foreign investment and inefficiencies of its [Iranian] state-planned economy", Iranian oil exports would vanish by 2014–2015, although he notes that this outcome has "no relation to 'peak oil.'" Earlier, the Gerald Ford Administration had arrived at a similar assessment, and independent studies conducted by the Foreign Affairs Select Committee of the British Parliament and the U.S. National Academy of Sciences previously confirmed that Iran has a valid economic basis for its nuclear energy program.

The Iranians believe that concerns about nuclear weapons proliferation are pretextual, and any suspension of enrichment is simply intended to ultimately deprive Iran of the right to have an independent nuclear technology:

[W]e had a suspension for two years and on and off negotiations for three ... Accusing Iran of having "the intention" of acquiring nuclear weapons has, since the early 1980s, been a tool used to deprive Iran of any nuclear technology, even a light water reactor or fuel for the American-built research reactor ... the United States and EU3 never even took the trouble of studying various Iranian proposals: they were – from the very beginning – bent on abusing this Council and the threat of referral and sanctions as an instrument of pressure to compel Iran to abandon the exercise of its NPT guaranteed right to peaceful nuclear technology....

Iran says that its inalienable right to peaceful nuclear technology has been the subject of "the most extensive and intensive campaign of denial, obstruction, intervention and misinformation" and that the international community has been subject to "bias, politicized and exaggerated information" on the Iranian nuclear program and activities.

After the 1979 Iranian Revolution, Iran informed the International Atomic Energy Agency (IAEA) of its plans to restart its nuclear program using indigenously made nuclear fuel, and in 1983 the IAEA planned to provide assistance in uranium conversion (not enrichment) to Iran under its Technical Assistance Program, until the program was terminated under U.S. pressure. An IAEA report at the time stated clearly that its aim was to "contribute to the formation of local expertise and manpower needed to sustain an ambitious program in the field of nuclear power reactor technology and fuel cycle technology". Iran's enrichment program was openly discussed on national radio in the early 1980s, and IAEA inspectors were even invited to visit Iran's uranium mines in 1992.

Iran announced plans in 1995 to build a uranium hexafluoride (UF_{6}) conversion plant at the Nuclear Technical Centre in Esfahan, with Chinese assistance. During a November 1996 IAEA visit to Isfahan, Iran informed the IAEA Department of Safeguards that it planned to build a uranium hexafluoride (UF_{6}) conversion plant at the Nuclear Technology Center. The UF_{6} plant was scheduled to open after 2000, but the project was abandoned by China under pressure from the United States in October 1997. The Iranians informed the IAEA that they would complete the project nonetheless. In 2000, the Iranians completed the uranium conversion project, using the blueprints provided to them by China, and declared the facility to the IAEA. The facility was planned with the intention of supplying uranium dioxide (UO_{2}) as fuel to IR-40, the 40 MW heavy water reactor under construction at Arak and to meet the needs of uranium hexafluoride (UF_{6}) for the Natanz enrichment facility.

Iran argues that it disclosed information about its programs in which "in nearly all cases, it was not any way obliged to disclose in accordance with its obligations under its safeguards agreement with the IAEA." Iran says its voluntary confidence building measures were only "reciprocated by broken promises and expanded requests" and that the EU3 "simply wanted prolonged and fruitless negotiations" to inhibit Iran from exercising its inalienable right to peaceful nuclear technology.

Iran says it has suggested to the EU3 to ask the IAEA to develop monitoring modalities for Iran's enrichment program as objective guarantees to ensure that Iran's nuclear program will remain exclusively for peaceful purposes and has also provided its own set of Western suggested modalities to the Agency.

However, Iran says it will not suspend its enrichment because "it would further be deprived from its inalienable right to work on nuclear fuel cycle, with the aim of producing required fuels for its research reactors and nuclear power plants."

Dr. William O. Beeman, Brown University's Middle East Studies program professor, who spent years in Iran, says that the Iranian nuclear issue is a unified point of their political discussion:

The Iranian side of the discourse is that they want to be known and seen as a modern, developing state with a modern, developing industrial base. The history of relations between Iran and the West for the last hundred years has included Iran's developing various kinds of industrial and technological advances to prove to themselves—and to attempt to prove to the world—that they are, in fact, that kind of country.

Stephen McGlinchey agrees, noting that the Islamic Republic of Iran "owes its existence to its identity as a reaction to the Western way of life and of doing business. To come to a conciliation with the international community, spearheaded by the American insistence that Iran must not ever have full mastery of the nuclear cycle is in essence dismantling the foundations and the pride of the Regime."

Iran also believes it has a legal right to enrich uranium for peaceful purposes under the Nuclear Non-Proliferation Treaty (NPT), a right which in 2005 the U.S. and the EU-3 began to assert had been forfeited by a clandestine nuclear program that came to light in 2002.

Iranian politicians compare its treatment as a signatory to the NPT with three nuclear-armed nations that have not signed the NPT: Israel, India, and Pakistan. India and Pakistan developed an indigenous nuclear weapons capability, and it is widely suspected that Israel has as well: Israel by 1966, India by 1974, and Pakistan by 1990.

The Iranian authorities assert that they cannot simply trust the United States or Europe to provide Iran with nuclear energy fuel, and point to a long series of agreements, contracts and treaty obligations which were not fulfilled. Developing nations say they do not want to give up their rights to uranium enrichment and do not trust the United States or other nuclear countries to be consistent suppliers of the nuclear material they would need to run their power plants.

Some have argued that there is a double standard between the treatment of Iran, which was reported to the Security Council for undeclared enrichment and reprocessing activities, and South Korea, which had failed to report enrichment and reprocessing experiments but was not found in non-compliance. In South Korea's case, issues were reported by the IAEA Secretariat but the IAEA Board of Governors did not make a formal finding of non-compliance. In making its decision, the Board said "there is no indication that the undeclared experiments have continued" and observed that the "Republic of Korea has an Additional Protocol in force and that developments in the Republic of Korea demonstrate the utility of the Additional Protocol." Pierre Goldschmidt, former head of the department of safeguards at the IAEA, has called on the Board of Governors to adopt generic resolutions which would apply to all states in such circumstances and has argued "political considerations played a dominant role in the board's decision" to not make a formal finding of non-compliance.

Despite its history with the West, Iran has said it would like to see a warming in relations. Akbar Hashemi Rafsanjani, the chairman of the Expediency Council and the Assembly of Experts, has said that Iran is not seeking enmity with the U.S. and that Iran would respond to any "formal" message which contained "change in practice". Seyed Mohammad Marandi, a professor at Tehran University, has suggested that if the United States is serious about negotiating with Iran in the future then "that the United States must take concrete steps toward decreasing tension with Iran" such as reassessing Iranian sanctions, reassessing Iranian assets frozen in the United States since the Iranian revolution, and reassessing Washington's backing of Israel. Professor Hamidreza Jalaiepour, a political sociology teacher in Tehran, said if the U.S. examined these options, Iran would be likely to immediately respond in a variety of ways, including helping stabilize Afghanistan, for example.

In July 2012, Iran's state broadcaster IRIB launched a poll asking Iranians whether they would support a halt in the uranium enrichment operations in return for stopping international economic sanctions imposed against Iran. After two days of voting, 63% of respondents voted in favor of suspending uranium enrichment in exchange for the gradual easing of sanctions. IRIB removed the poll and replaced it with one asking about Iranians' opinions on the Iranian parliament's proposal to close the Strait of Hormuz in response to the European Union oil embargo. They removed this poll as well after 89% of respondents opposed closing the strait, and replaced it with one about soccer. IRIB claimed that the results were hacked by the BBC, while the BBC denied the allegations, calling them "ludicrous and completely false". Meir Javedanfar, an Iranian-born(Israeli) commentator with the Middle East Economic and Political Analysis Company, stated that, "This survey shows that, while the Iranian people might want nuclear energy, they don't want it at the price the government is forcing them to pay through its negotiating strategy. Their opinion is not factored into the government's negotiating strategy and this poll shows they are not happy with it."

A former general in Iran's Revolutionary Guards rejected the Iranian government's claims that the nuclear program is peaceful, and dismissed a fatwa issued by Ayatollah Khamenei and has accused the supreme leader, Ayatollah Ali Khamenei, of having blood on his hands over the brutal crackdown on the opposition, and described government claims that its nuclear program is entirely peaceful as a "sheer lie."

=== Ali Khamenei ===
According to the Atomic Energy Organization of Iran, the supreme leader of Iran has the following view regarding Iranian nuclear program:

The Islamic Republic of Iran regards use of nuclear and chemical weapons as a cardinal and unforgivable sin. We raised the slogan "Middle East free from nuclear weapons", and we remain committed to this slogan. This slogan does not mean giving up our right to peaceful uses of nuclear energy and production of nuclear fuel. Peaceful use of nuclear energy is the right of all nations in accordance with rules of international law. All nations should be able to use this clean energy for vital uses in the country and for the people. They need not be dependent on others in exercising this right. Certain western countries that unlawfully possess nuclear weapons want to keep the monopoly of nuclear fuel production for themselves. A surreptitious movement is evolving these days to create a permanent center with an international name and appearance, but in fact in the permanent hands of few western countries, for the monopoly of production and sale of nuclear fuel. Islamic Republic of Iran has never sought nuclear weapons and will not surrender the right of its people to peaceful use of nuclear energy. Our motto is "Nuclear energy for all, nuclear weapons for none". We will insist on this motto and know that breaking the monopoly of few western countries in production of nuclear energy in the framework of NPT is good for all sovereign nations, including member states of the Non-Aligned Movement.

== Middle East ==
=== Arab views ===
==== 2007 ====
The New York Times reported in 2007 that Iran's nuclear program had spurred interest in establishing nuclear power programs by a number of neighboring countries, including Saudi Arabia, Turkey and Egypt. According to the report, "roughly a dozen states in the region have recently turned to the IAEA in Vienna for help in starting" nuclear programs. The article also described neighbouring states as very hostile to any nuclear weapons program Iran might embark on, stating "many diplomats and analysts say that the Sunni Arab governments are so anxious about Iran's nuclear progress that they would even, grudgingly, support a United States military strike against Iran."

==== 2009 ====
On 17 May 2009, Arab League Chief Amr Moussa said that Israel's nuclear program was more worrying than Iran's.

In 2009, the governments of a number of Arab countries began using economic means to persuade Russia and China to support sanctions against Iran's controversial program.

==== 2010 ====
In July 2010, the United Arab Emirates Ambassador Yousef al-Otaiba to the United States publicly announced support for a military strike against Iran's nuclear program, and said that the benefits of striking Iran's nuclear program would be greater than the short-term costs of such a strike. Al-Otaiba explained that "we cannot live with a nuclear Iran. I am willing to absorb what takes place at the expense of the security of the U.A.E." Al-Otaiba noted that Iran has supported terrorist groups, including Hamas and Hezbollah, without possessing nuclear weapons, and questioned why Iran would be more cautious if it did contain nuclear weapons. He also predicted that should Iran acquire nuclear weapons, a nuclear arms race would be ignited in the region. In response, former United States ambassador to the United Nations John Bolton said that al-Otaiba's comments were indicative of the views of various Arab countries in the region.

===== Release of diplomatic cables =====
Diplomatic cables leaked in 2010 revealed that the officials of some Persian Gulf countries such as Saudi Arabia and Bahrain supported a military attack against Iran to stop the Iranian nuclear program. The diplomatic cables revealed that King Abdullah of Saudi Arabia repeatedly urged America to strike Iran and destroy its nuclear program, in order to "cut off the head of the snake". Jordanian and Bahraini officials also called for an end to Iran's nuclear program, including by military means, while leaders in Saudi Arabia, the United Arab Emirates, and Egypt called Iran "evil" and an "existential threat" that would take them to war.

In one diplomatic cable, King Hamad bin Isa al-Khalifa of Bahrain said that the source of trouble in Iraq and Afghanistan could be traced to Iran, and said that the Iranian nuclear program must be stopped, even by military means. King Hamad said, "The danger of letting it go on is greater than the danger of stopping it."

==== Planned Israeli military strike on nuclear program ====
After his death, it was revealed that Shimon Peres had said that he prevented a military strike on Iran's nuclear program that had been ordered by Benjamin Netanyahu and Ehud Barak in 2010.

==== 2011 ====
In June 2011, Prince Turki al-Faisal of Saudi Arabia warned that if Iran developed nuclear weapons, Saudi Arabia would be forced to "pursue policies which could lead to untold and possibly dramatic consequences". The prince described Iran as a "paper tiger with steel claws" and blamed Iran for interfering and destabilizing the Middle East. A Saudi Arabian official clarified that should Iran develop a nuclear weapon, "that will be unacceptable to us and we will have to follow suit."

==== 2012 ====
In January 2012, Bahrain's King Hamad bin Isa Al Khalifa said that Iran was a common threat to Bahrain, America, and Israel.

On 12 July 2012, a former Iranian general in the Revolutionary Guards said that Iranian government claims of a peaceful nuclear program was a "sheer lie", giving a look at the political dissent within elite forces in charge of the nuclear program. The general says that he was threatened with death for disloyalty but it was eventually dismissed.

In August 2012, Hezbollah Member of Parliament (Lebanon) Walid Sakariya said that Iran's nuclear program was designed to "create a balance of terror with Israel" and "finish off the Zionist enterprise", and would also help Syria resist Israeli and Western pressure.

=== Israel ===
Some Israeli officials publicly characterize Iran's nuclear program as an "existential threat" to Israel, and Israeli leaders assert that all options are kept open in dealing with Tehran. The threat has been compared to the threat the Jews of Europe faced prior to the Holocaust. However, some Israeli officials have privately and publicly rejected such a characterization of Iran's program. According to The Economist, "most of those Israeli experts willing to talk rate the chances of an Iranian nuclear attack as low. Despite Mr Ahmadinejad, most consider Iran to be a rational state actor susceptible to deterrence."

In 2017, Former Mossad deputy chief Ram Ben-Barak stated that he does not "think Iran will use a nuclear bomb, but it will feel immune to outside pressure. It will spread instability throughout the world, without worrying about consequences".

Israel, which is not a party to the NPT and is widely believed to possess the Middle East's only nuclear arsenal does not believe the 2007 National Intelligence Estimate conclusion that Iran had stopped its nuclear weapons program in 2003, insisting that it has additional evidence of an active and continued Iranian nuclear weapons program. Israel has also rejected the IAEA's November 2007 and February 2008 reports on Iran, and Israeli officials have called for the resignation of IAEA Director General ElBaradei, accusing him of being "pro-Iranian". Senior Israeli, French, British, German and American officials have reportedly pressured the IAEA to release allegedly censored evidence of an Iranian nuclear weapons program. IAEA spokesman Marc Vidricaire, though, issued a brief statement on the matter, characterizing the allegations against ElBaradei as "misinformation or misinterpretation" which have "no basis in fact".

In early June 2008, Israeli Deputy Prime Minister Shaul Mofaz expressed frustration with the perceived ineffectiveness of sanctions aimed at discouraging Iran from uranium enrichment. Israel believes the enrichment may be used to aid an alleged nuclear weapons program. Mofaz said that the United Nations Security Council and the international community have "a duty and responsibility to clarify to Iran, through drastic measures, that the repercussions of their continued pursuit of nuclear weapons will be devastating". In the same interview, Mofaz also made more direct threats to Iran's nuclear facilities, saying "if Iran continues with its programme for developing nuclear weapons, we will attack it." Iranian spokesman Gholam Hoseyn Elham has dismissed Israeli attacks on its nuclear facilities as "impossible". "The Israeli regime has been emboldened due to carelessness and silence of the Security Council," the Iranians further said in a response letter to the United Nations. These statements came only days after Prime Minister Ehud Olmert asked for stronger sanctions, saying that "the long-term cost of a nuclear Iran greatly outweighs the short-term benefits of doing business with Iran."

Israeli officials were reportedly concerned about the Bush administration's decision on 16 July 2008, to send a high-ranking diplomat to attend negotiation sessions between EU representatives and Iran's chief nuclear negotiator in Geneva. Israel sources reportedly obtained assurances from the Bush administration that there would be no compromise on the demand that Iran end uranium enrichment.

The Israelis have also sought to "alert the American intelligence community to Iran's nuclear ability", in preparation for the new NIE, reportedly due in November 2008. In September 2008, Yossi Baidatz, the head of the research division of Israeli military intelligence was quoted to say that Iran was "not likely" to obtain nuclear capabilities by 2010.

Walter Pincus of the Washington Post has written that Israel's stance on nuclear arms complicates efforts against Iran. Gawdat Bahgat of the National Defense University believes Iran's nuclear program is partially formed on the potential threat of a nuclear Israel. Iran and the Arab League have proposed that the Middle East be established as a Nuclear Weapon Free Zone. Israel said in May 2010 it would not consider taking part in nuclear weapon-free zone discussions or joining the Nuclear Nonproliferation Treaty until a lasting peace was achieved with its neighbors.

Israel has repeatedly warned that it will strike Iran's nuclear facilities if its nuclear program is not stopped through diplomatic channels. In June 2008, the Israeli Air Force conducted a massive and highly publicized exercise over the Mediterranean Sea, where Israeli aircraft practiced aerial refuelling and simulated attacks on targets 870 miles off the Israeli coast. Israeli Ambassador to the United States Sallai Meridor said that the window for diplomatic action was rapidly closing, and that "Israel will not tolerate a nuclear Iran." In 2010, a joint air exercise between Israel and Greece took place on Crete. Called "Minoas 2010", it was temporarily suspended by Greece in the aftermath of the 2010 Gaza flotilla raid, but later resumed. Israel tested five F-16I Sufa and five F-15I fighter jets in strike missions, Sikorsky CH-53 Sea Stallion helicopters in pilot rescue missions, and a Boeing aircraft to practice aerial refuelling. Because Iranian nuclear facilities are heavily fortified and often located underground, Israel Military Industries is developing the MPR-500 bunker buster bomb, and Israeli pilots have allegedly practiced airstrikes involving low-yield nuclear weapons.

In May 2010, Israel reportedly deployed Dolphin class submarines with nuclear missiles capable of reaching any target in Iran in the Persian Gulf. Their reported missions were to deter Iran, gather intelligence, and to potentially land Mossad agents on the Iranian coast. In July, two Israeli missile boats were also deployed.

Some in Israel are worried that Iran may achieve a latent capability to produce nuclear weapons without taking any overt steps that would expose it to further international action. But Foreign Minister Avigdor Lieberman hopes that sanctions and negotiations can resolve the problem.

In April 2012, former Israeli foreign minister Shlomo Ben-Ami warned that "if the path of war is finally taken, and, in its aftermath, the international community fails once again to pacify the world's most dysfunctional region, the Middle East would devolve into an unruly chaos far more dangerous than the threat of an Iranian bomb." The same month, the IDF's chief of staff, Lt. Gen. Benny Gantz, stated his belief that the Iranian government is "composed of very rational people" who have not yet decided to go for a nuclear bomb, and who are unlikely to.

In August 2012, Ha'aretz reported claims of an Israeli decision maker that the U.S. intelligence community had changed its assessment and believed that Iran was making important steps in its development of a nuclear weapon, a viewpoint similar to that of Israel and representing a major turn from the last NIE report on Iran in 2007. The cited "alarming" intelligence concerning Iran's nuclear program, including marked progress on key elements of its weaponization drive. U.S. sources did not confirm this claim, stating instead that the overall U.S. assessment had not changed.

On 22 October 2012, Mossad sent a top-secret cable to South Africa that laid out a "bottom line" assessment of Iran's nuclear work, revealing that Israel's intelligence service believed that Iran was "not performing the activity necessary to produce weapons".

"It (the cable) appears to contradict the picture painted by Netanyahu of Tehran racing towards acquisition of a nuclear bomb. Writing that Iran had not begun the work needed to build any kind of nuclear weapon, the Mossad cable said the Islamic Republic's scientists are "working to close gaps in areas that appear legitimate such as enrichment reactors [sic]". ... Mossad's formal assessment of Iran's nuclear capacity and intentions differs from the scenario outlined by the prime minister at the UN."

In 2017, Israeli Defense Forces Chief of Staff Gadi Eisenkot acknowledged that Iran is still interested in "creating a nuclear program, though the [2015 nuclear] agreement rolled back some of its capabilities."

Despite politicians talks, Israeli public does not seem to share the same concern about the Iranian nuclear deal. Or rather, they do acknowledge that nuclear capability in Iran is a threat and they do not believe that the new agreement proposed by Obama will solve the situation. However, in recent polls, when asked to rank what is the major threat to Israeli security, Iran's nuclear power figured only in second position. Hamas and Hezbollah's terrorism is what concerns the most. Also when asked about internal issues, what figured as the highest concern for Israel's stability was the relationship between Israelis and Palestinians, not the Iranian nuclear threat. So, even though the population shares with the politicians the same concern about the nuclear threat, they do not think that should be the country's first issue to deal with.

==== "Red line" ====
On 28 September 2012, Netanyahu gave a speech to the UN General Assembly in which he set forward a "red line" of 250 kg of 20% enriched Uranium, because this amount would be enough Uranium to fuel the first nuclear bomb if it were further enriched to weapons grade fuel levels. Netanyahu claimed that if Iran would stockpile such an amount of 20% enriched Uranium, that this would constitute 90% of the required progress toward building the first nuclear bomb, which according to Netanyahu would constitute an intolerable risk for Israel. Netanyahu used a cartoon graphic of a bomb to illustrate his point, indicating three stages of uranium enrichment, noting that Iran had already completed the first stage, and stating that "By next spring, at most by next summer at current enrichment rates, [Iran] will have finished the medium enrichment and move on to the final stage. From there, it's only a few months, possibly a few weeks before they get enough enriched uranium for the first bomb." Netanyahu delivered his speech the day after Iranian President Mahmoud Ahmadinejad spoke on the Jewish holy day of Yom Kippur, a presentation that the American, Canadian, and Israeli delegations had deliberately not attended. Iran has since stayed below this threshold by converting and using up parts of its stockpile of 20% enriched Uranium.

=== Other ===
In May 2005, during a trip to Israel, Turkish Prime Minister Recep Tayyip Erdogan said that Iran's nuclear ambitions were a threat both to Israel and the entire world.

== North America and Europe ==
=== 2004 ===
A study by the UK Parliamentary Office of Science and Technology concluded in March found that "some of John Bolton's criticisms were not supported by an analysis of the facts (for example, much of the gas flared off by Iran is not recoverable for energy use), but that Iran's decision to adopt the nuclear power option could not entirely be explained by the economics of energy production."

=== 2005 ===
In March, The New York Times reported that a bipartisan Congressional inquiry concluded that the United States had inadequate intelligence to reach any conclusions on the state of Iran's nuclear program. In March 2009, the US Director of National Intelligence and Defense Intelligence Agency Director both testified before Congress that Iran did not have highly enriched uranium for bomb-making and had not made the decision to produce any, and also that Iran's missile program was not related to its nuclear program.

Much of the debate about the 'Iranian nuclear threat' is therefore driven by concern that Iran's mastery of civilian technology could provide it the means to rapidly develop a weapons capability should Iran wish to do so in the future.

=== 2006 ===
The Economist magazine opined that "even before the election of President Mahmoud Ahmadinejad Iran was negotiating in bad faith. During this period, European officials believe, it continued to work in secret on nuclear research, having promised to suspend uranium enrichment." The Iranians attributed the concealment of portions of their nuclear program to the fact that the US hampered their overt attempts at acquiring the necessary technology for their program, and also point out that they promised to suspend enrichment rather than cease all research. After about two years, Iran ceased its voluntary and temporary suspension of enrichment after receiving a "very insulting and humiliating" offer which some analysts described as an "empty box". In response, the West rejected an Iranian offer for a nuclear consortium in Iran and said they would go to the Security Council for sanctions. Iran says its voluntary confidence building measures were only "reciprocated by broken promises and expanded requests" and that the EU3 "simply wanted prolonged and fruitless negotiations" to inhibit Iran from exercising its inalienable right to peaceful nuclear technology. An article published in the Proceedings of the National Academy of Sciences concluded that "Iran's claim to need nuclear power to preserve exports is genuine."

In June, German Minister of Defense Franz Josef Jung suggested that Iran would be able to operate its enrichment program for civilian purposes, as long as there was close monitoring by the IAEA to ensure that Iran did not develop nuclear weapons. He said that "one cannot forbid Iran from doing what other countries in the world are doing in accordance with international law" but that the "key point is whether a step towards nuclear weapons is taken. This cannot happen." Later, the Europeans reportedly also considered a compromise proposal where Iran would be allowed to continue spinning its centrifuges but would not feed any processed uranium hexafluoride (UF_{6}) into the machines during the course of negotiations.

The Iranians had also indicated that they were willing to consider suspending large-scale enrichment for up to two years, but were not prepared to freeze enrichment entirely.

The suggestion was reportedly shot down by the US, and Robert Joseph, the Under-Secretary of State for Arms Control reportedly told ElBaradei: "We cannot have a single centrifuge spinning in Iran. Iran is a direct threat to the national security of the United States and our allies, and we will not tolerate it. We want you to give us an understanding that you will not say anything publicly that will undermine us."

On 31 July, the Security Council passed a resolution demanding that Iran stop "all enrichment-related and reprocessing activities". (Reprocessing involves chemically separating plutonium from other nuclear waste products, a procedure that can lead to production of bomb-grade fuel.) A month later, an IAEA report indicated that "there are no indications of ongoing reprocessing activities in Iran," but that other elements of nuclear activity and the use of centrifuges had continued or resumed. The IAEA also said that Iran did not submit a timetable to the IAEA to resolve its nuclear program, as Iran had promised. The report also said that construction of the heavy water research reactor at Arak had continued.

=== 2007 ===
President Bush said that Iran's pursuit of nuclear weapons could trigger "World War III", while in 2007 Undersecretary of State Nicholas Burns warned that Iran may be seeking a nuclear weapons capability.

In June, IAEA director Mohammad ElBaradei suggested that Iran should be allowed limited uranium enrichment under strict supervision of the IAEA. His remarks were formally criticised by Nicholas Burns, the US Under-Secretary of State, who said: "We are not going to agree to accept limited enrichment." ElBaradei later criticized the US position and said, "I have seen the Iranians ready to accept putting a cap on their enrichment [program] in terms of tens of centrifuges, and then in terms of hundreds of centrifuges. But nobody even tried to engage them on these offers. Now Iran has 5,000 centrifuges. The line was, 'Iran will buckle under pressure.' But this issue has become so ingrained in the Iranian soul as a matter of national pride."

In September, Undersecretary of State Nicholas Burns called for the UN Security Council members and U.S. allies to help push for a third round of sanctions against Iran over the nuclear program. Meanwhile, French Foreign Minister Bernard Kouchner said that although the international community is focused on diplomacy, the international community should prepare for the possibility of war if Iran obtains nuclear weapons.

In the same month, French Foreign Minister Bernard Kouchner, while discussing penalties that Europe might impose on Iran, said that they could be "economic sanctions regarding financial movements... Our German friends proposed this. We discussed it a few days ago. The international community's demand is simple: They must stop enriching uranium. Our Iranian friends want to create, they say, civilian nuclear energy. They have the right to that, but all that they are doing proves the contrary. That is why we are worried."

In November, President Bush said that Iran has a sovereign right to civilian nuclear technology, but expressed concern that the enrichment process could lead to a nuclear weapon. Bush also expressed concerns over Iranian leaders' threats against Israel, and said that all options, including a military option, were "on the table" in regards to preventing Iran from obtaining nuclear weapons.

Tensions were raised by media reports of an Israeli air incursion over northeastern Syria on 6 September 2007. One U.S. official said the attack hit weapons heading for the Lebanese militant group Hezbollah, an ally of Syria and Iran, but there also has been speculation the Israelis hit a nascent nuclear facility or were studying routes for a possible future strike on Iran. Others suspect Israel was performing an intelligence operation for the U.S.

==== 2007 U.S. National Intelligence Estimate (NIE) ====
In December, the U.S. NIE (representing the consensus view of all 16 American spy agencies) "judged with high confidence" that Iran had halted its nuclear weapons program in 2003, with "moderate confidence" that the program remains frozen, and with "moderate-to-high confidence" that Iran is "keeping open the option to develop nuclear weapons". The estimate said that the enrichment program could still provide Iran with enough raw material to produce a nuclear weapon sometime by the middle of next decade but that intelligence agencies "do not know whether it currently intends to develop nuclear weapons" at some future date. Senator Harry Reid, the majority leader of the Senate in 2008, said he hoped the administration would "appropriately adjust its rhetoric and policy". The conclusion that Iran had a nuclear weapons program in 2003 was reportedly mainly based on the contents of a laptop computer that was allegedly stolen from Iran and provided to US intelligence agencies by dissidents. The Russians dismissed this conclusion, stating that they had not seen evidence that Iran had ever pursued a nuclear weapons program.

The 2007 NIE report, contradicted the previous 2005 NIE conclusion which asserted that Iran had an active and on-going nuclear weapons program in 2005. According to a senior administration official, in a January 2008 conversation with Israeli Prime Minister Ehud Olmert, Israeli and other foreign officials asked President Bush to explain the 2007 NIE. Bush "told the Israelis that he can't control what the intelligence community says, but that (the NIE's) conclusions don't reflect his own views". After Bush seemed to distance himself from the report, the White House later said Bush endorses the "full scope" of the US intelligence findings on Iran.

Mohammed ElBaradei, the Director of the IAEA, noted in particular that the NIE's conclusions corresponded with the IAEA's consistent statements that it had "no concrete evidence of an ongoing nuclear weapons program or undeclared nuclear facilities in Iran".

In February 2009, testifying before the U.S. Senate, Director of National Intelligence Dennis Blair said, "although we do not know whether Iran currently intends to develop nuclear weapons, we assess Tehran at a minimum is keeping open the option to develop them." He said Iran was unlikely to achieve a nuclear weapon before 2013 because of foreseeable technical and programmatic problems, and that this would be in the case that it decided to do so.

In 2009, the Wall Street Journal reported that Germany's foreign intelligence agency, the Bundesnachrichtendienst (BND), amassed evidence of a sophisticated Iranian nuclear weapons program that continued beyond 2003, contradicting the 2007 National Intelligence Estimate. A special national security panel of the Federal Supreme Court cited a May 2008 BND report which says that the BND "showed comprehensively" that "development work on nuclear weapons can be observed in Iran even after 2003." The judges also said that the BND supplemented these findings in 2008, showing "the similarities between Iran's acquisition efforts and those of countries with already known nuclear weapons programs, such as Pakistan and North Korea."

In 2010, The New York Times reported that President Obama's top advisers no longer believe one of the findings of the 2007 National Intelligence Estimate about Iran, that Iran ended all nuclear weapons design work in 2003.

=== 2008 ===
In February, Pierre Vimont, the French Ambassador to the United States, urged that the United States adopt a more flexible approach to Iran by accepting its regional role and recognizing that the nuclear issue has broad popular support among Iranians.

An op-ed published in January in The Economist said that the threat of force had "put some steel" into the diplomatic process, and opined, "learning to enrich uranium—a hugely costly venture—still makes questionable economic sense for Iran, since it lacks sufficient natural uranium to keep them going and [they] would have to import the stuff."

On 3 March, the United Nations Security Council imposed a new round of sanctions against Iran, due to its refusal to end uranium enrichment and heavy-water-related projects, as it was required to under United Nations resolutions. The Security Council affirmed an earlier decision that Iran must immediately end its uranium enrichment and heavy-water-related projects, and called for "vigilance and restraint" from all members of the United Nations regarding entry of people engaged in providing support for Iran's nuclear activities, and also extended the suspension of financial assets of people/entities who support Iran's nuclear activities. In addition, the council called on United Nations members to "exercise vigilance" regarding the activities of financial institutions in these member states with banks located in Iran, and also to inspect cargo to and from Iran . U.S. officials told The New York Times that the new sanctions went beyond the nuclear issue. "The new language was written to rein in what they [U.S. officials] see as Tehran's ambitions to become the dominant military power in the Persian Gulf and across the Middle East."

In June, the P5 (China, France, Russia, United Kingdom, and United States) plus Germany (the P5+1) offered benefits to Iran, including "legally binding" fuel supply guarantees. The deal offered by the P5+1 would leave Iran reliant on external sources of fuel, as is true for most countries with nuclear power programs though many of them also lack indigenous resources to produce their own fuel, or do not have the same strategic security concerns as Iran. Iranian President Mahmoud Ahmadinejad rejected this proposal, saying that Iran had the right to process uranium for fuel and that Iran "will not retreat one iota in the face of oppressing powers".

In December, the ISIS said that Iran had produced 425 kilograms of uranium, and that Iran had "not yet achieved a break-out capability", but that Iran may be close to a break-out capability. In response to statements that Iran had enough material to make a weapon, the Arms Control Association urged the U.S. and the media to exhibit greater care when making claims about Iran's nuclear program. Ivan Oelrich and Ivanka Barzashka, from the Federation of American Scientists, said that the "simplistic calculations" contained in the ISIS article were wrong because "just taking the quantity of LEU and multiplying by the U-235 concentration does not work because not all of the U-235 is recovered". Cheryl Rofer, a retired 35-year researcher at Los Alamos National Laboratory and former president of the Los Alamos Committee on Arms Control and International Security, has argued that for Iran to make a bomb from this material it would need to kick all the inspectors out of the country, reconfigure thousands of closely watched centrifuges, and then engage in years of enrichment. According to the American Institute of Physics, the most difficult step in building a nuclear weapon is the production of fissile material. Iran has enriched uranium to "less than 5%", consistent with fuel for a nuclear power plant and well below the purity of WEU (around 90%) typically used in a weapons program. HEU with a purity of 20% or more is usable in a weapon, but this route is less desirable because far more material is required to obtain critical mass. "Our production of a nuclear energy program is completely within the framework or structure of international laws," said Ali Akbar Javanfekr, media adviser to President Mahmoud Ahmadinejad. David Albright, president of the group which published the report, maintained that Iran's enriched uranium meant that Israel was losing control over the timing of Iran's nuclear activities and that even Iran pretending to have a bomb would be a threat. The International Atomic Energy Agency said its inspectors have not found evidence to suggest that Iran is attempting to process low-enriched uranium into weapons-grade uranium, but expressed concern that Iran was still refusing to comply with the United Nations' requirement of ending its uranium enrichment activity.

=== 2009 ===
A February Institute for Science and International Security report argued there was a perceived "fundamental inconsistency" between the stated purposes and available information on the capabilities of Iran's domestic uranium production program. The report, citing data published by Iran and the IAEA on Iran's uranium resources, argued that those resources are sufficient for developing a weapons capability, but would not meet the requirements for even a single power reactor. The report stated that "the absence of activity at one of Iran's two uranium mines casts further doubt on its claims that it can establish independence in the fuel cycle required for a civil nuclear energy program."[ The Atomic Energy Organization of Iran responded to this and related stories by saying it had sufficient uranium mines. The Foreign Ministry of Iran said Western claims of a uranium shortage were "media speculation without any scientific basis" and that Iran was not seeking uranium on international markets. The Atomic Energy Organization of Iran has said surveys had shown proven reserves of approximately 3,000 tons of uranium so far and that the expected resources of Iran could be at the range of 20,000–30,000 tons. The organization said that "according to all the surveys performed in power sector of Iran, nuclear option is the most competitive to fossil alternatives if the existing low domestic fuel prices are gradually increased to its opportunity costs at the level of international prices." In effect, the Bush administration took the position that Iran was too dangerous to be allowed "the technology to produce nuclear material for electricity".

In February, the IAEA said that Iran had produced approximately 1,000 kg of low-enriched uranium, which experts say is enough (if further enriched to weapon grade) to produce one nuclear bomb.

In that same month, the United States said that Iran's launching of a data processing satellite could be linked to the development of a military nuclear capability and that the activities were of "great concern". The U.S. specifically said it would continue "to address the threats posed by Iran, including those related to its missile and nuclear programs". Despite the U.S. saying it would use all elements of the national power to deal with Tehran, Iran criticized what it perceived as Western double standards, and said the launch was a step to remove what it called a scientific monopoly that certain world countries were trying to impose on the world. Iraqi National Security Advisor Muwafaq al-Rubaie said Iraq was very pleased with the launch of Iran's data-processing national satellite.

On 26 February, the U.S. Ambassador to the United Nations Susan Rice said that the United States "will seek to end Iran's ambition to acquire an illicit nuclear capability and its support for terrorism". Robert Wood, spokesman for the U.S. State Department, said that the U.S. believes that "Iran doesn't need to develop its own nuclear capacity" and specifically that the U.S. does not believe that Iran needs to develop an indigenous uranium enrichment capacity. On 8 April 2009, Wood said that "on the basis of mutual respect and mutual interest" the U.S. would sit with the P-5+1 in discussions with Iran and ask the EU High Representative for Common and Foreign Security Policy to extend an invitation to Iran to meet with representatives of the P-5+1. Wood further said, "We hope this will be the occasion to seriously engage Iran on how to break the logjam of recent years and work in a cooperative manner to resolve the outstanding international concerns about its nuclear program". U.S. Secretary of State Hillary Clinton has said that "pursuing very careful engagement on a range of issues that affect our interests and the interests of the world with Iran makes sense".

In March, Iran's ambassador to International Atomic Energy Agency said that UN sanctions united Iranians to protect their "national interest" of enrichment. In April 2009, Mahmoud Ahmadinejad said his country "welcomes a hand extended to it should it really and truly be based on honesty, justice and respect". Karim Sadjadpour, of the Carnegie Endowment for International Peace, has said that Iran's leader "holds strongly that Tehran must not compromise in the face of U.S. pressure or intimidation, for it would project weakness and encourage even greater pressure". Richard Haass, President of the Council on Foreign Relations, has said "the United States should be willing to discuss what Iran (as a signatory of the NPT) describes as its "right to enrich". It may well be necessary to acknowledge this right, provided that Iran accepts both limits on its enrichment program (no HEU) and enhanced safeguards". Mark Fitzpatrick, a Senior Fellow for Non‐Proliferation at the International Institute for Strategic Studies, has said "a key policy challenge is how to build a barrier between a latent nuclear weapons capability and actual weapons production. This is difficult when, as in Iran's case today, the distinction is blurred almost to the point of invisibility."

=== 2010 ===
In April 2010, during the signing of the new START Treaty between America and Russia, President Obama said that the United States, Russia, and other nations are demanding that Iran face consequences for failing to fulfill their obligations under the Nuclear Non-Proliferation Treaty, and that "we will not tolerate actions that flout the NPT, risk an arms race in a vital region, and threaten the credibility of the international community and our collective security."

In March 2010, American Secretary of State Hillary Clinton discussed Iran's nuclear program and President Obama's handling of the program. Clinton said:

In addition to threatening Israel, a nuclear-armed Iran would embolden its terrorist clientele and would spark an arms race that could destabilize the region. This is unacceptable. It is unacceptable to the United States. It is unacceptable to Israel. It is unacceptable to the region and the international community. So let me be very clear: The United States is determined to prevent Iran from acquiring nuclear weapons...

We've made extensive efforts to reengage with Iran, both through direct communication and working with other partners multilaterally, to send an unmistakable message: Uphold your international obligations. And if you do, you will reap the benefits of normal relations. If you do not, you will face increased isolation and painful consequences.

We took this course with the understanding that the very effort of seeking engagement would strengthen our hand if Iran rejected our initiative. And over the last year, Iran's leaders have been stripped of their usual excuses. The world has seen that it is Iran, not the United States, responsible for the impasse. With its secret nuclear facilities, increasing violations of its obligations under the nonproliferation regime, and an unjustified expansion of its enrichment activities, more and more nations are finally expressing deep concerns about Iran's intentions. And there is a growing international consensus on taking steps to pressure Iran's leaders to change course.

=== 2011 ===
In August, French President Nicolas Sarkozy warned that Iranian attempts to build long-range missiles and nuclear weapons could cause a pre-emptive attack, saying that Iran's "military nuclear and ballistic ambitions" are a "growing threat". Sarkozy blamed Iran for this crisis, noting that "Iran refuses to negotiate seriously. Iran is carrying out new provocations in response to the challenge from the international community for it to provide a credible response."

On 1 December, the European Union agreed to impose sanctions on 180 Iranian officials and companies. These new sanctions target 39 people and 141 companies, and include the freezing of assets and travel bans.

=== 2012 ===
In late January, European Union nations agreed to enforce an oil embargo on Iran as a result of its nuclear program. This move dealt a harsh blow to Iran, forcing Iran to find other buyers for its oil, as the EU is the second largest market for Iranian oil after China. The United States State Department said that these were "the kinds of steps that we would like to see not just from our close allies and partners in places like Europe but from countries around the world." The embargo went into effect on 1 July.

In response, British Prime Minister David Cameron, German Chancellor Angela Merkel, and French President Nicolas Sarkozy released a joint statement explaining that:

Our message is clear. We have no quarrel with the Iranian people. But the Iranian leadership has failed to restore international confidence in the exclusively peaceful nature of its nuclear programme. We will not accept Iran acquiring a nuclear weapon. Iran has so far had no regard for its international obligations and is already exporting and threatening violence around its region. "We call on Iran's leadership immediately to suspend its sensitive nuclear activities and abide fully by its international obligations. The door is open to Iran to engage in serious and meaningful negotiations about its nuclear programme. Until Iran comes to the table, we will be united behind strong measures to undermine the regime's ability to fund its nuclear programme, and to demonstrate the cost of a path that threatens the peace and security of us all.

During this month, as the European Union was preparing to enforce tougher sanctions against Iran, French President Nicolas Sarkozy urged "much tougher, more decisive sanctions" in order to avoid military action, explaining that "those who do not want to reinforce sanctions against a regime which is leading its country into disaster by seeking a nuclear weapon will bear responsibility for the risk of a military breakdown." In addition, German foreign minister Guido Westerwelle said that Iran's nuclear program is "unacceptable and a danger to world peace".

In February, The Financial Times observed: "Current evidence suggests the Iranians want the ability to make a bomb but have not taken the decision to actually build one."

An editorial published in The Economist noted that with the money spent on its nuclear program, Iran could have built "ten conventional plants of the same capacity, fired solely by the natural gas that Iran currently flares off into the sky". David Isenberg, a senior analyst with the Washington-based British American Security Information Council (BASIC), has argued oil and gas production has its own costs, that Iran gains strategic value from being an oil and gas exporter, and that "as a sovereign nation Iran is entitled to make its own sovereign decisions as to how provide for its own energy needs".

British Foreign Secretary William Hague warned in February that Iran's nuclear program may lead to other countries in the Middle East seeking to gain nuclear weapons should Iran develop nuclear weapons, which could trigger a new Cold War and begin the "most serious round of nuclear proliferation since nuclear weapons were developed." Hague also said "That would be a disaster in world affairs." Hague stressed that "all options" should remain on the table, but stated that a military strike would have "enormous downsides".

In the same month, Canadian Prime Minister Stephen Harper said that he feared that Iran was prepared to use nuclear weapons if they developed one, and said that Iran's nuclear program is "a grave threat to peace and security". Harper explained that compared to nearly all other possessors of nuclear weapons in the past, the Iranian government has less of a fear to use them, noting that "we're dealing with a fanatical and dangerous regime." Compared to the debate regarding Iraq and weapons of mass destruction, which was used as a pretext to invade Iraq in 2003, Harper explained that "I don't think there's much debate today among informed people about Iran's intentions and Iran's systematic progress toward attaining nuclear weapons.

In March, a Reuters/Ipsos poll revealed that a majority of Americans, 56%, would support military action against Iran, even if it led to increased gas prices, if there was evidence demonstrating that Tehran was building nuclear weapons. 39% said that they opposed a military strike, while 62% of Americans said that they'd support Israel striking Iran over its nuclear program.

A special report by Reuters in March reported that, "the United States, European allies and even Israel generally agree on three things about Iran's nuclear program: Tehran does not have a bomb, has not decided to build one, and is probably years away from having a deliverable nuclear warhead."

A Congressional Research Service report obtained by Bloomberg several days later concluded that Iran's "workshops" for making nuclear centrifuges and components for the devices are widely dispersed and hidden, that neither Israel nor the United States is certain of the locations of all such facilities, and that Iran could recover from an attack on its nuclear sites within six months, compounding the difficulties of a potential military strike by Israel.

A poll conducted in July found that 80% of Americans view Iran's nuclear program as a threat to the United States and its NATO allies. 39% viewed it as a very big threat, 41% viewed it was a moderate threat, 12% viewed it as not much of a threat, and 6% viewed it as not being a threat. In regards to how much of a threat the nuclear program is to Israel, 60% viewed it as a very big threat to Israel while 27% viewed it as a moderate threat. 80% believe that Iran is building nuclear weapons, including 72% of Democrats, 81% of Independents, and 89% of Republicans.

In July, MI6 Chief Sir John Sawyers stated that he believes that Iran could become a nuclear weapons state in two years (2014). He also stated that covert operations by British spies denied Iran from developing nuclear weapons as early as 2008. According to Sawyers, "It's equally clear that Israel and the United States would face huge dangers if Iran were to become a nuclear weapon state. I think it will be very tough for any prime minister of Israel or president of the United States to accept a nuclear-armed Iran." Sawyers stated that military action may happen in such a case, but that it was the job of MI6 to "delay that awful moment when the politicians may have to take a decision between accepting a nuclear-armed Iran or launching a military strike against Iran".

In August, Ha'aretz reported on a National Intelligence Estimate (NIE) report released from Washington showed that the American intelligence community believes that Iran is making important steps in its development of a nuclear weapon, a viewpoint similar to that of Israel, and represents a major turn from the last NIE report on Iran in 2007. The report writes about "alarming" intelligence concerning Iran's nuclear program, including marked progress on key elements of its weaponization drive.

In late August, French President Francois Hollande said that Iran can't be allowed to possess nuclear weapons, even for a single day, and that Iran's nuclear program is a "threat to all the countries in the region and cannot be allowed in a regime that frequently calls for the destruction of the State of Israel".

In early September, Britain, France, and Germany called for new sanctions to be imposed on Iran over its nuclear program. German Foreign Minister Guido Westerwelle stated that new sanctions should be discussed as a result of Iran's failure to comply with international demands to reduce its nuclear work, and labelled the result of three rounds of negotiations in 2012 with Iran and world leaders as "disappointing".

On 7 September, Canada severed diplomatic ties with Iran, closed its embassy in Tehran, and expelled Iranian diplomats from Canada, citing a variety of reasons, amongst them the Iranian nuclear program and threats against Israel. A few weeks later, Canadian Prime Minister Stephen Harper said that the Iranian government is "unambiguously, a clear and present danger" due to a combination of its nuclear program anad other factors.

On 9 September, German Foreign Minister Guido Westerwelle stressed that "a nuclear-armed Iran would not only pose a threat to Israel but to the stability of the entire region." Westerwelle explained that Germany shares Israel's concerns about Iran's nuclear program, and that "a nuclear-armed Iran is not an option."

On 22 September, the United States Senate overwhelmingly passed a resolution by a vote of 90-1 which reaffirmed American efforts to prevent Iran from developing a nuclear weapon. The resolution also said that the use of containment regarding a nuclear-capable Iran is not an option.

On 24 September, Britain, France, and Germany appealed to the European Union to enforce new sanctions on Iran due to its nuclear program, with a diplomat explaining that "we think there is still time for a political solution, a diplomatic solution, and this is what we are working for. But we cannot accept nuclear weapons in the hands of Iran."

On 26 September, former United States President Bill Clinton announced that the world needs to prevent Iran from obtaining a nuclear weapon, noting that the Iranian government has a record of "supporting terror and if they had nuclear weapon, it would be (too dangerous), even if you believe they never use". Clinton also said that this can not be compared to Israel's situation, saying that there isn't any reason to prevent Israel from developing nuclear weapons should it choose, because "Israel is not supporting Hezbollah. Israel doesn't send terrorists to cross Syria to train in the Bekaa Valley in Lebanon. No one thinks that Israel is about to drop a bomb on Tehran." Bill Clinton also said that:

A lot of their neighbors will get bombed, and the more of these weapons you have hanging around, the more fissile material you've got, the more they're vulnerable to being stolen or sold or just simply transferred to terrorists. Iran has all these extensive contacts with terrorist groups and even if the government didn't directly sanction it, it wouldn't be that much trouble to be – to get a Girl Scout cookie's worth of fissile material, which, if put in the same fertilizer bomb Timothy McVeigh used in Oklahoma City, is enough to take out 20 to 25 percent of Washington, DC Just that little bit. So the prospect of spreading, in a way, dirty nuclear bombs with smaller payloads that could wreak havoc and do untold damage, goes up exponentially every time some new country gets this capacity. And you don't have any control over what happens to the fissile material. "What they're [Iran] really saying is in spite of the fact that we deny the Holocaust, that we threaten Israel and we demonize the United States, we want you to trust us. In spite of the fact that we won't cooperate with the international regime set up to avoid an arms race in the Middle East and set up to avoid nuclear proliferation, we want you to trust us. They don't have a tenable position.

A poll conducted in September by Basswood Research for The Foreign Policy Initiative revealed that Iran was cited as the most dangerous threat to American national security interests, with 45.1% of respondents choosing Iran. In addition, 62% of Americans favored preventing Iran from obtaining nuclear weapons, even if this requires the use of military force, as opposed to avoiding a conflict and accepting the prospects of Iranian nuclear weapons.

On 30 October, French President François Hollande called on Iran to take "concrete action" against its nuclear program, and explained that Iran hadn't proven that its nuclear program was peaceful. Hollande said that France was prepared to vote for more sanctions on Iran.

=== 2013 ===
Analyzing Iranian nuclear policy, Uriel Abulof submits that "facing a deepening legitimacy crisis, the Iranian regime, throughout Ahmadinejad's tenure, has been increasingly drawing on nuclear diversion to boost public support," and that "if the legitimacy crisis lingers, the regime may opt to further employ diversionary nuclear strategies, most of which require a viable 'nuclear latency,' rather than actual military nuclear capability." On 15 June 2013, Hassan Rohani won the Iranian presidential election and assumed office on 3 August 2013. Rouhani is considered "the most moderate and outward-looking of the presidential cadidiates deemed fit to contest the election by the supreme leader, Ayatollah Ali Khamenei" and subsequently "has raised hopes for a nuclear deal between Iran and the international community."The Economist, however, argues that neither a moderate Iranian president, nor sanctions, or military threats will divert Iran from attaining the capability to rapidly "produce enough weapons-grade uranium for one or more bombs before the IAEA or Western intelligence agencies would even know it had done so." "Mr. Rohani's election means the next round of negotiations will be conducted in a better atmosphere. But to what end? ... For Iran, the continuation of talks is a means of getting some easing of sanctions in exchange for concession that will have little impact on its nuclear program." The newspaper thinks that a more accommodating Iranian president can be a trap for the international community as well as an opportunity for it. Rohani can improve relations with the West through constructive engagement and ultimately ease the burden of sanctions on Iran. But Iran could take advantage of its rosier international standing by continuing to enrich uranium and achieve a breakout capability. Abulof argues that "the 2013 election of Hassan Rouhani as president demonstrated the regime's legitimacy crisis, while upping the ante for both mitigating the crisis and exacerbating it. If the latter transpires, the regime may opt to further escalate its diversionary nuclear strategies."

== G8 ==
Since 2003, when the IAEA began investigating Iran's previously undeclared nuclear activities, the G8 (Canada, France, Germany, Italy, Russia, Japan, the United Kingdom and the United States) has repeatedly voiced its concerns over Iran's nuclear program. At the 2003 G8 summit in France, G8 leaders said: "We will not ignore the proliferation implications of Iran's advanced nuclear program." The 2004 G8 Action Plan on Nonproliferation "deplore[d] Iran's delays, deficiencies in cooperation, and inadequate disclosures, as detailed in IAEA Director General reports". In 2005 G8 leaders concluded that "It is essential that Iran provide the international community with objective guarantees that its nuclear program is exclusively for peaceful purposes in order to build international confidence."

In 2006, after Iran was found in non-compliance with its safeguards agreement and reported to the UN Security Council, the international community, led by the United States, the European Union, and the G8 pushed for an end to enrichment activities in Iran. The G8 stated that: "Iran not having shown willingness to engage in serious discussion of those proposals and having failed to take the steps needed to allow negotiations to begin, specifically the suspension of all enrichment related and reprocessing activities, as required by the IAEA and supported in the United Nations Security Council Presidential Statement, we supported the decision of those countries' Ministers to return the issue of Iran to the United Nations Security Council."

This diplomatic effort culminated in United Nations Security Council Resolution 1737 in December 2006, adopted (after a significant amount of diplomatic efforts) with the approval of both China and Russia (which held veto power). This resolution imposes specific, but light, economic sanctions solely linked to Iran's nuclear program. The resolution mentions that in the event that "Iran has not complied with this resolution, [the security council will] adopt further appropriate measures under Article 41 of Chapter VII of the Charter of the United Nations to persuade Iran to comply with this resolution and the requirements of the IAEA, and underlines that further decisions will be required should such additional measures be necessary." According to the resolution, Iran must comply within 60 days, i.e. before 20 February 2007.

Iran strongly rejected this resolution, and the 118 member states of the Non-Aligned Movement have backed Iran's right to "acquire peaceful nuclear technology". Iran's parliament passed a bill on 27 December 2006 obliging the government to "revise" its cooperation with the International Atomic Energy Agency and to accelerate its drive to master nuclear technology in a reaction to the U.N. resolution. The bill gave President Mahmoud Ahmadinejad's government a free hand to adopt a tougher line against the IAEA, including ending its inspections of Iran's atomic facilities.

On March 2, 2007, six key nations, including the 5 permanent members of the UN Security Council, which hold veto power, have agreed to pass a new resolution to impose tougher sanctions on Iran regarding its nuclear issue at the United Nations Security Council, French Foreign Minister Philippe Douste-Blazy said.

The following year, G8 leaders "deplore[d] the fact that Iran [had] so far failed to meet its obligations under UNSC Resolutions 1696, 1737 and 1747", and threatened "further measures, should Iran refuse to comply with its obligations", but held out the prospect that "[i]nternational confidence in the exclusively peaceful nature of the Iranian nuclear program would permit a completely new chapter to be opened in our relations with Iran not only in the nuclear but also more broadly in the political, economic and technological fields."

At the G8 summit in Japan in 2008, G8 leaders said:

We express our serious concern at the proliferation risks posed by Iran's nuclear programme and Iran's continued failure to meet its international obligations. We urge Iran to fully comply with UNSCRs 1696, 1737, 1747 and 1803 without further delay, and in particular to suspend all enrichment-related activities. We also urge Iran to fully cooperate with the IAEA, including by providing clarification of the issues contained in the latest report of the IAEA Director General. We firmly support and cooperate with the efforts by China, France, Germany, Russia, the United Kingdom and the United States supported by the High Representative of the EU to resolve the issue innovatively through negotiation, and urge Iran to respond positively to their offer delivered on 14 June, 2008. We also commend the efforts by other G8 members, particularly the high-level dialogue by Japan, towards a peaceful and diplomatic resolution of the issue. We welcome the work of the Financial Action Task Force to assist states in implementing their financial obligations under the relevant UNSCRs.

== Asia ==
=== China ===
In January 2012, Chinese Prime Minister Wen Jiabao strongly criticized Iran's nuclear program, saying that China "adamantly opposes Iran developing and possessing nuclear weapons", while warning Iran against closing the Straits of Hormuz, which would be viewed as an act of aggression amongst most countries. In regards to business deals with Iran, Prime Minister Wen explained that these deals were separate from diplomatic deals.

=== Japan ===
In August 2010, Japan imposed new sanctions on Iran over its nuclear program, which ban transactions with some Iranian banks, and also target energy-related investments. Chief Cabinet Secretary Yoshito Sengoku told a news conference that Japan had taken those steps as they are necessary to push for nuclear non-proliferation and prevent its nuclear development.

On 13 January 2012, Japanese Prime Minister Yoshihiko Noda said that he had "strong concerns" regarding Iran's nuclear program, and that this concern is shared by the international community. Noda said that "it is Japan's basic stance to see a diplomatic and peaceful solution to the issue." In addition, Noda said that over a period of five years, Japan has reduced its imports of crude oil from Iran by about 40%.

=== India ===
India's rapidly developing ties with the United States have created difficulties for India's foreign policy makers. India, a nuclear power which is not party to the NPT, has expressed its concern over the possibility of another nuclear weapon-armed state in its neighborhood with Indian Prime Minister Manmohan Singh stating that he was against Iran acquiring nuclear weapons. India voted in the IAEA Board of Governors to report Iran to UN Security Council in 2005 for non-compliance with its NPT safeguards agreement. Despite some domestic opposition, the Indian government later voted to report Iran to the UN Security Council in 2006. Leftist parties in India have criticized the government for bowing to US pressure on the issue.

India quickly downplayed the incident and restated its commitment to develop closer ties with Iran. India urged international diplomacy to solve the Iranian nuclear row but added that it could not "turn a blind eye to nuclear proliferation in its neighborhood".

Despite heavy U.S. criticism, India has continued negotiations on the multi-billion dollar Iran–Pakistan–India gas pipeline from Iran to India through Pakistan. India is keen to secure energy supplies to fuel its rapidly growing economy and the gas pipeline may address India's energy security concerns. The United States has expressed concern that the pipeline project would undermine international efforts to isolate Iran.

==== In-context of the Indo-US nuclear deal ====
India is not a signatory to the Non-Proliferation Treaty (NPT). According to US Under Secretary of State Nicholas Burns, it was India's vote against Iran which helped clear the way for the US-India nuclear cooperation deal Critics say the US-India nuclear cooperation deal itself undermines the Non-Proliferation Treaty at a time when Iran was accused of violating the treaty. Critics argue that by promising nuclear cooperation with India, the Bush administration has reversed a legal ban on such cooperation which was in place since the passage of the Nuclear Nonproliferation Act of 1978, and violated US obligations under the Non-Proliferation Treaty which prohibits sharing nuclear technology with non-signatories such as India. The Harvard International Review concedes in an editorial that the Indo-US nuclear deal "undermines the world's present set of nuclear rules" but argues that the Iranian nuclear program remains an "unacceptable risk" regardless of the NPT. It reasoned that "regardless of what the NPT says, and regardless of what Iran says about the NPT, an Iranian nuclear program is still an unacceptable risk."

=== Pakistan ===
Pakistan adopted a policy of neutrality, and subsequently played a non-belligerent role in easing the tension in the region. In 2006, Prime minister Shaukat Aziz with his Turkish counterpart Recep Tayyip Erdoğan paid a secret state visit and encouraged Iranian President Mahmoud Ahmadinejad to change course regarding Iran's nuclear program, as the current direction was in neither Iranian nor regional interests. While steadily blocking Iran's intention to build a nuclear stockpile, Pakistan has issued foreign policy statements supporting Iran's right to use its program for peaceful purposes.

In a speech at Harvard University in 2010, Pakistan's foreign minister Shah Mehmood Qureshi argued that Iran had "no justification" to pursue nuclear weapons, citing the lack of any immediate threat to Iran, and urged Iran to "embrace overtures" from the United States. Qureshi also observed that Iran had signed the NPT and should respect the treaty.

In 2009, Abdul Qadeer Khan, a leading architect of the Pakistan's nuclear weapons program, boasted that he helped Iran in its nuclear program in an effort to "neutralize" Israel's power in the Middle East by advising Iran to use the same supply network he had established to support Pakistan's nuclear weapons program in the 1970s. Khan also claimed that he did so with the permission of Pakistan's government, contradicting his confession in 2004 that he had acted on his own.

=== Russia ===
Russia maintains a close working relationship with Iran and is directly involved in its civilian nuclear program as of 2025. Russia completed construction of the Bushehr Nuclear Power Plant, which is fueled by uranium produced in Russia, and over 200 Russian workers are currently involved in the construction of two other reactors at this location. On June 3, 2025, Kremlin spokesman Dmitry Peskov stated that the Kremlin trusts Iran's official statements regarding its nuclear program, "As for the accusations [against] the Iranian side that they are going to develop nuclear weapons, we primarily rely on Iran's official statements that the republic has no wish or plans to possess nuclear weapons. This is what we primarily proceed from in this regard." Since at least 2007, Russian President Vladimir Putin has maintained that there is no proof of Iran pursuing nuclear weapons. On 11 September 2009, Prime Minister Putin opposed the use of force or further sanctions against Iran. On June 21, 2025, Putin stated that, "Russia, as well as the IAEA (International Atomic Energy Agency), has never had any evidence that Iran is preparing to obtain nuclear weapons, as we have repeatedly put the Israeli leadership on notice."

=== Developing countries and the Non-Aligned Movement ===
On 16 September 2006, in Havana, Cuba, all of the 118 Non-Aligned Movement member countries, at the summit level, declared their support of Iran's right to develop nuclear energy for peaceful purposes in their final written statement.

== Other countries ==
Officials in several countries have voiced support for Iran over its nuclear program. These include Iraq, Algeria and Indonesia. Turkey has expressed support for Iran's right to a nuclear program for peaceful energy production, and along with Egypt has urged for a peaceful solution to the standoff.

In 2008, support for tough measures against Iran's nuclear program fell in 13 out of 21 Arab countries according to a new BBC World Service Poll. According to a 2008 global poll of Arab public opinion, the Arab public does not appear to see Iran as a major threat and does not support international pressure to force Iran to curtail the program.
