= Gary G. Yerkey =

American journalist

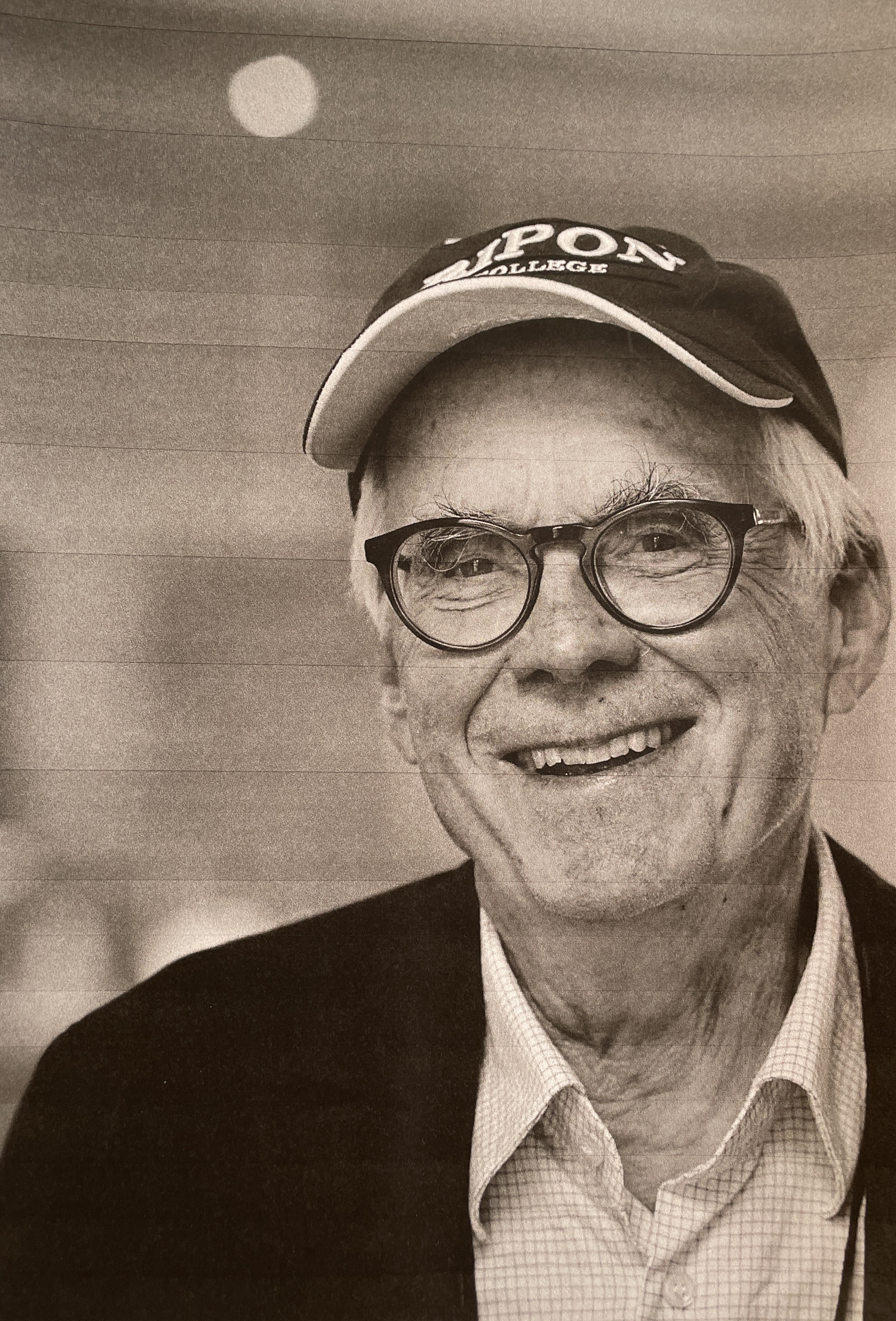
Gary G. Yerkey in 2024

Gary G. Yerkey, born in Chicago, is an American author and journalist currently based in Washington, D.C., contributing to The Christian Science Monitor and other publications.

== Career ==
A graduate of Ripon College with B.A. in philosophy, he later undertook post-graduate work at the American University of Beirut and spent more than a decade in Europe and the Middle East, reporting for Time Life, ABC News, The Christian Science Monitor, the International Herald Tribune and other U.S. news organizations. He was also a staff reporter for Bloomberg BNA covering Congress and the Executive Branch. He has reported from India, Morocco, Malaysia, China, Singapore, Colombia, Canada, Poland, Latvia, Estonia and many other countries and has interviewed and written profiles of dozens of famous and not-so-famous individuals—from influential jazz drummer Art Taylor to civil rights movement icon John Lewis and award-winning Mexican poet and environmental activist Homero Aridjis. He has also served in the United States Air Force and is a former pilot.

== Awards ==
In 2015, he was among the "foot soldiers" of the civil rights movement who received the Congressional Gold Medal—the nation's highest civilian award—for their participation in the 1965 Selma to Montgomery marches, led by John Lewis and Martin Luther King Jr. In 2024, he was the recipient of a Distinguished Alumni Citation from Ripon College.

== Works ==
- Still Time to Live: A Biography of Jack Belden, ISBN 0615458882
- South to Selma: 'Outside Agitators' and the Civil Rights March that Changed America, ISBN 1484868951
- Dying for the News: Honoring Tom Treanor and the Other Reporters Killed Covering World War II, ISBN 1517205174
- A Pilot's Pilot: Gen. Caleb V. Haynes and the Rise of American Air Power, 1917–1944, ISBN 1984121480
- A Fever in My Blood: The American Life and Tragic Death of Darrell Berrigan, ISBN 1091536880
- The Two Wars of Bruce C. Hopper: From WW I Bomber Pilot to WW II Spy, ISBN 9798705570287
- Troublemakers: On the March for Civil Rights From Selma to Black Power, ISBN 9798714083310
- He's Coming to Start Riots: On the Road to Black Power with 'The Reverend' Willie Ricks, ISBN 9781530507566
- When the Yanks Came to Sweden: How Thousands of American Airmen, Spies and Diplomats Changed a 'Neutral' Nation in World War II, ISBN 979-8322297161
