= Mark A. Greene =

American archivist (1958–2017)

- Born: Mark Allen Green; September 2, 1958; Rockville, Maryland, U.S.
- Died: June 21, 2017 (aged 58–59)
- Education: Ripon College; University of Michigan
- Occupations: administrator; archivist
- Employers: Society of American Archivists; American Heritage Center; The Henry Ford; Minnesota Historical Society; Carleton College
- Notable work: More Product, Less Process
- Spouse: Kathy Marquis

Mark A. Greene (1958–2017) was an American archivist who served as the 63rd President of the Society of American Archivists (SAA). He was a leader and prominent author within the archives profession, and is well known for the development of the archival management principles in More Product, Less Process (MPLP) together with Dennis Meissner.

== Life ==
Greene was born in Rockville, Maryland, and attended Ripon College, completing a bachelor's degree in history and politics. He then completed his education at the University of Michigan with a master's degree in History with cognates in archival administration and Modern Chinese History.

Greene began his career in archives as college archivist at Carleton College (1985–1989), before becoming the head of acquisitions for the Minnesota Historical Society in 1989. While there, he developed his expertise and a national reputation in appraisal, including deaccessioning and reappraisal. In 2000, he became the head of Research Center Programs at The Henry Ford, where he spent two years before becoming director of the American Heritage Center at the University of Wyoming in 2002. Greene retired in 2015.

Within the professional community, Greene served in various positions within the Midwest Archives Conference (MAC) and SAA. Between 1992 and 1994 he served as a member of the MAC Council, followed by a term as president of the association from 1995 to 1997. In 2002 he was elected an SAA Fellow, and later served as president of that organization from 2007 to 2008.

== Death ==
Greene died in a car accident on June 21, 2017, near Cheyenne, Wyoming.

== Works ==
- "A Critique of Social Justice as an Archival Imperative: What Is It We're Doing That's All That Important?" American Archivist 76, no. 2 (Fall/Winter 2013): 303-335
- "The Power of Archives: Archivists' Values and Value in the Post-Modern Age," American Archivist 72, no. 1 (Spring/Summer 2009): 17-41
- "More Product, Less Process: Revamping Traditional Archival Processing," American Archivist 68, no. 2 (Fall/Winter 2005): 208-263 (with Dennis Meissner)
- "The Power of Meaning: The Mission of Archives in the Postmodern World," American Archivist 65, no. 1 (2002): 42-55
- "Et Tu Schellenberg? Thoughts on the Dagger of American Appraisal Theory," American Archivist 59, no. 3 (Summer 1996): 298-310 (with Frank Boles)
- “The surest proof: A utilitarian approach to appraisal." Archivaria, 45 (1998), 127- 169.
