= Arthur John Ahearn =

American physicist and mass spectrometrist

- Born: June 20, 1902
- Died: June 12, 1990 (aged 87)
- Education: University of Minnesota
- Spouse: Ella Ahearn
- Children: 2
- Scientific career
- Fields: physics, mass spectrometry
- Institutions: Bell Labs

Arthur John Ahearn (20 June 1902 – 12 June 1990) was an American physicist and mass spectrometry researcher.

== Career and research ==
Ahearn graduated from Ripon College in 1923 and went to graduate school at the University of Minnesota, where he completed his PhD in 1931. At this time, he had already moved to Bell Labs, where he started to work in 1929 until his retirement in 1966. His research at Bell labs involved electron emission, electron optics and electron microscopy, thermionics, and mass spectrometry. During his time at Bell labs, he worked with Bruce Hannay to develop the first spark source mass spectrometer. They showed that this approach can be used to analyze semiconductors, specifically measure dopants in semiconductors at high sensitivity.

Ahearn received the Spectroscopy award at Pittcon in 1971. He and his wife Ella had two children.
