= Cheryl Rofer =

American chemist

Cheryl K. Rofer
- Education: University of California, Berkeley; Ripon College
- Scientific career
- Workplaces: Los Alamos National Laboratory

Cheryl K. Rofer is an American chemist and writer who worked as a nuclear researcher at Los Alamos National Laboratory for over thirty years. She was involved with the environmental clean-up of Estonia and Kazakhstan after the dissolution of the Soviet Union.

== Early life and education ==
Rofer had an interest in science from an early age. Rofer earned her bachelor's in chemistry degree at Ripon College. She moved to the University of California, Berkeley for graduate studies, where she earned a master's degree. After graduating she joined Los Alamos National Laboratory.

== Research and career ==
Rofer's early research considered photochemistry and how it can be used to understand uranyl compounds in organic solvents. She later developed spectroscopic tools for isotope separation. In the wake of the Soviet occupation of Estonia and Kazakhstan, Rofer became involved in environmental remediation.

After retiring from Los Alamos National Laboratory in 2001 Rofer became involved in documenting the Manhattan Project. She maintains a blog on nuclear physics (Nuclear Diner) which provides a critical analysis of the likelihood of nuclear terrorism. She has also contributed to newspapers including The Globe and Mail, The Washington Post and Mother Jones.

When asked about the 2022 Russian invasion of Ukraine, Rofer told Chemistry World, "Obviously, you don’t want nuclear reactors in the middle of a war. But here we are". She has written opinion pieces for Nature, BuzzFeed and HuffPost.

== Selected publications ==
- Rofer-DePoorter, Cheryl K. (1981). "A comprehensive mechanism for the Fischer-Tropsch synthesis". Chemical Reviews. 81 (5): 447–474. doi:10.1021/cr00045a002. ISSN 0009-2665.
- Information, Los Alamos National Laboratory. United States. Department of Energy. Office of Scientific and Technical (1992). Conversion of hazardous materials using supercritical water oxidation. Los Alamos National Laboratory. OCLC 873742784.
- Information, Los Alamos National Laboratory. United States. Department of Energy. United States. Department of Energy. Office of Scientific and Technical (1995). Waste site characterization through digital analysis of historical aerial photographs at Los Alamos National Laboratory and Eglin Air Force Base. United States. Dept. of Energy. OCLC 68390241.
