= Allen Cohen (composer) =

Allen Cohen (born 1951) is an American composer, arranger, conductor, vocal coach, pianist and university professor.

== Education ==
Cohen holds his Bachelor of Arts degree in Music and Drama from Ripon College and Master of Fine Arts in Music Composition from the State University of New York at Purchase. He received a doctorate in composition from the City University of New York, where he studied with Thea Musgrave, Bruce Saylor, and David Del Tredici.

== Awards ==
Allen Cohen has received a Meet the Composer grant and several ASCAP Plus awards.

== Compositions ==
Cohen's work includes music for orchestra, chamber ensembles, solo instruments, and voice. His pieces on compact disc include Autumn Morning for orchestra (Vienna Modern Masters), Duo-Partita for cello and guitar (Artek), Grace for piano solo (New Ariel), Sonata for Trumpet and Piano (Song of Myself) and Wings of Desire for flugelhorn and piano (Capstone). He has written incidental scores for films and off-Broadway plays, and has arranged dance music for five Broadway musicals.

== Performance career ==
He has conducted many operetta and musical theater productions on Broadway and elsewhere, and has performed extensively as a pianist.

== Teaching career ==
Cohen has been teaching various courses at Fairleigh Dickinson University, where he currently serves as a Professor of Music. Previously, he taught at Hunter College, New York University and Manhattanville College.

== Publications ==
He is the author of Howard Hanson in Theory and Practice (Praeger/Greenwood) and the popular children's book That's So Funny I Forgot to Laugh! (Scholastic), which has sold more than half a million copies, and co-author of Writing Musical Theater (Palgrave Macmillan). His scholarly papers in theory and musical theater has been presented at conferences in New York City, Hawaii, and Germany.

Cohen has had articles published in The New York Times and The Baker Street Journal.
