= Mary Curtis Wheeler =

American nurse (1869–1944)

- Wheeler, from a 1922 publication
- Born: July 12, 1869; Brooklyn, New York
- Died: September 29, 1944 (aged 75)
- Other name: Mary C. Wheeler
- Occupation: Nurse

Mary Curtis Wheeler was an American nurse, best known for her leadership at the Illinois Training School for Nurses and for her work in advancing nursing education.

== Life ==
Wheeler was born in Brooklyn, New York on July 12, 1869. She graduated from Ripon College in 1890. She moved to Chicago to study at the Illinois Training School for Nurses, where she earned her nursing degree in 1893. Her first job was as the superintendent of Elgin's Sherman Hospital, a position she held from 1893 to 1899. In the fall of 1899, she moved to Quincy where she held the position of superintendent at Blessing Hospital from 1899 until 1910.

While in Illinois, Wheeler advocated for improved education for nurses, and she was appointed to the Illinois State Board of Examiners of Registered Nurses in 1908 by then Governor Charles S. Deneen.

She was appointed superintendent of the Illinois Training School for Nurses in 1913, and she was the director of the school when its merger with the University of Chicago was announced in 1924.

From 1925 until 1930 she served as general secretary of the Michigan State Nurses Association.

She was also the president of the American Society of Superintendents for Training Schools from 1911 to 1913, and she served on the American Nurses Association's first Board of Directors for several years.

Wheeler died on September 29, 1944.

== Selected publications ==
- Wheeler, Mary C. (1918). Nursing Technic. J.B. Lippincott Company.
- Wheeler, Mary C. (1908). "Lessons in Dietetics. Cow's Milk and Some Foods Derived from Milk (Continued)". The American Journal of Nursing. 8 (10): 769–772. doi:10.2307/3403404. ISSN 0002-936X.
