= List of University of Wisconsin–La Crosse alumni =

The University of Wisconsin–La Crosse is a public university in La Crosse, Wisconsin. Following are some of its notable alumni.

== Business ==
Name	Class	Major	Notability	References
Ernest Emerson			CEO of Emerson Knives, knife maker, and martial artist	

== Clergy ==
Name	Class	Major	Notability	References
F. Richard Spencer			Roman Catholic bishop	

== Entertainment ==
Name	Class	Major	Notability	References
Christian Anderson			Musician	
Mark Belling			Conservative talk radio host, local newspaper columnist, and former television host	
Dan Davies			Actor and screenwriter	
Don Herbert			Host of the Mr. Wizard television show	
Gaetano Kagwa	1997		Uganda media personality	
Sandra Lee	1987		Host of The Food Network's Semi-Homemade with Sandra Lee and author	
Kirsten Olson	2014		Actor in the Disney film Ice Princess and former and figure skater	
Robert Schulz			Jazz cornet player	

== Government and civil service ==
Name	Class	Major	Notability	References
Mabel Deutrich			Assistant archivist for the Office of the National Archive (now NARA)	
Cindy Marten	1988		United States deputy secretary of Education	

== Military ==
Name	Class	Major	Notability	References
Gerald W. Clusen			U.S. Navy admiral	
Rodney R. Hannula			U.S. National Guard major general	
Richard Severson	1971		U.S. Air Force general	

== Politics ==
Name	Class	Major	Notability	References
M. Julian Bradley			Wisconsin State Senate - first African American Republican elected	
Sharon Weston Broome			Louisiana State Senate and mayor of Baton Rouge and East Baton Rouge Parish	
Steve Doyle			Wisconsin State Assembly and La Crosse County Board of Supervisors	
John Gard	1986		Former speaker of the Wisconsin State Assembly	
Thomas S. Hanson			Wisconsin State Assembly	
Edmund Hitt			Wisconsin State Assembly	
G. Erle Ingram			Wisconsin State Senate	
Dan Kapanke			Former member of the Wisconsin State Senate	
MaryAnn Lippert			Wisconsin State Assembly and educator	
John L. Merkt	1971		Wisconsin State Assembly	
Lewis T. Mittness			Wisconsin State Assembly	
Leland E. Mulder			Wisconsin State Assembly	
James D. H. Peterson			Wisconsin State Assembly	
Robert Quackenbush	1950		Wisconsin State Assembly and educator	
Marlin Schneider	1965		Wisconsin State Assembly	
Jennifer Shilling	1992		Wisconsin State Senate	
William H. Stevenson	1912		United States Congress	
Gregg Underheim			Wisconsin State Assembly	

== Sports ==
Name	Class	Major	Notability	References
Jerry Augustine			Professional baseball player	
Will Berzinski			Professional football player	
Ben Braun			College basketball coach	
Roman Brumm			Professional football player	
George Dahlgren	Non-degreed		Professional football player	
Mike Dee			Baseball coach at University of Illinois at Chicago	
Brian Gutekunst			General manager of the Green Bay Packers	
Don Iverson	1968		Professional golfer on the PGA Tour	
Don Kindt	1980		Professional football player	
Don Kindt Jr.			Professional football player	
Tom Klawitter			Professional baseball player	
Craig Kusick			Professional baseball player	
Craig Kusick Jr.			Arena Football League quarterback	
Ace Loomis	1950		Professional football player	
Mike Maslowski			Professional football player	
Ric Mathias	1997		Professional football player	
Greg Mattison	1970		College football coach and professional football player	
Neal Nelson			Coach for basketball, tennis, and golf; associate professor at the University of Wisconsin–Waukesha	
Tom Newberry	1986		Professional football player	
Kirsten Olson	2014		Figure skater and actor in the Disney film Ice Princess	
Dick Ritger			Professional ten-pin bowler and PBA and USBC Hall of Fame member	
Andrew Rock	2004		2004 Olympic gold medalist in track and field	
Vinny Rottino			Professional baseball player	
Bill Schroeder	1994		Professional football player	
Webb Schultz			Professional baseball player	
Ed Servais	1981		Baseball coach at Saint Mary's and Creighton	
Ellen Tronnier	1944		All-American Girls Professional Baseball League player	
Jeremy Unertl	2001		Arena Football League player	
Joel Williams	1978		Professional football player	

== Other ==
Name	Class	Major	Notability	References
Eric Foreman			Teacher	
Yia Vang	2010		Hmong-American chef	
