= Julia Young =

Julia Young may refer to:

- Julia Young (field hockey) (born 1995), American field hockey player
- Julia Ditto Young (1857–1915), American poet and novelist
- Julia Marks Young, archivist

== See also ==
- Julianne Young, American politician from Idaho
