= Virginia C. Purdy =

American archivist (1922–2015)

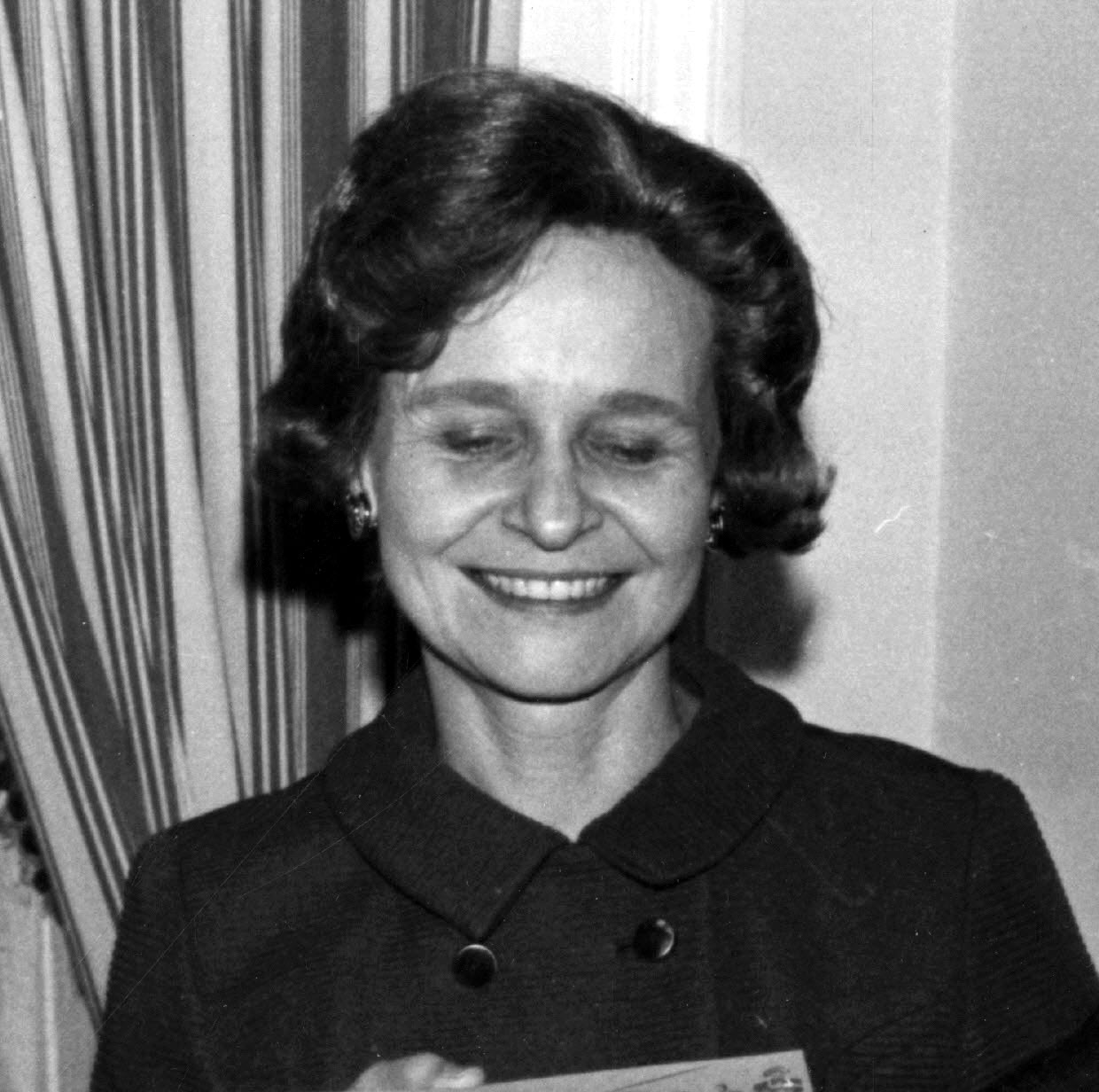
- in 1971
- Born: August 1, 1922; Columbia, South Carolina
- Died: May 22, 2015 (aged 92)
- Education: B.A. University of South Carolina, M.A. and Ph.D. George Washington University.
- Occupations: Historian and archivist
- Employer: National Archives and Records Administration
- Spouse: Donald Roderick Purdy
- Children: 2

Virginia Cardwell Purdy (August 1, 1922 – May 22, 2015) was an American archivist and historian at the National Archives and Records Administration (NARA). She was a Fellow of the Society of American Archivists and an editor of the journal The American Archivist (1978–1980).

== Personal life ==
Purdy was born in Columbia, South Carolina. In 1942, she earned a Bachelor of Arts degree from the University of South Carolina. She briefly taught in South Carolina before her career at NARA. She also earned an M.A. (1960) and Ph.D. (1970) in history from the George Washington University. Purdy met her husband, Donald Roderick Purdy, during World War II and they married on June 4, 1946. Because her husband was a Federal meteorologist, they lived in a number of cities across the country until permanently settling in the D.C. area in 1957.

== Professional life ==
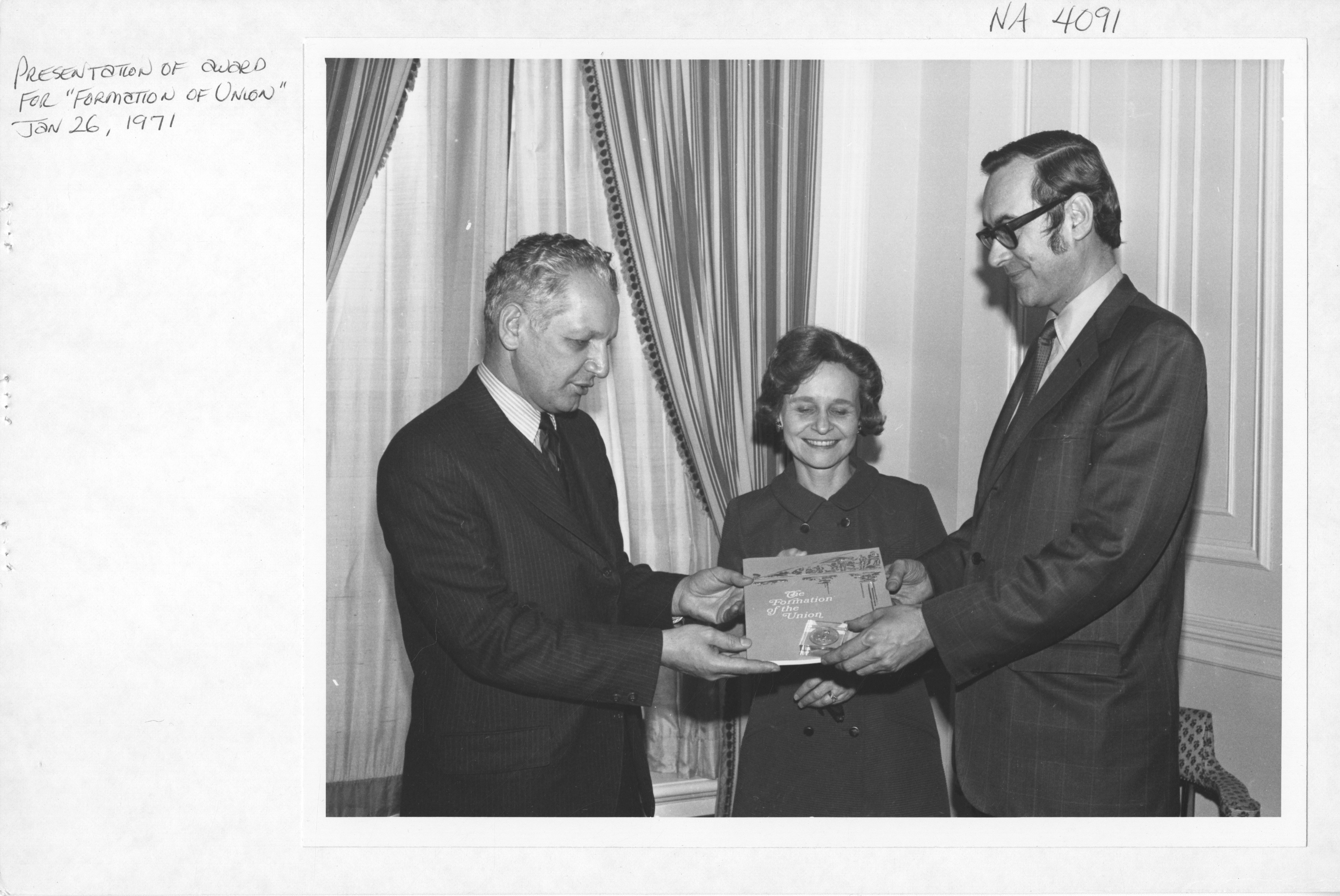
James B. Rhoads, Archivist of the United States (right), holding an award for the Formation of the Union catalog with Steven Tutellian of the Edward Stern Majestic Press, and Virginia C. Purdy, January 26, 1971.

Purdy's first position was as a reference librarian at the Library of Congress (1964–1966). Later, at the Smithsonian National Portrait Gallery, she was Assistant Historian (1966–1969) and Keeper of the Catalog of American Portraits (1969–70). At NARA (1970–1989), she worked as exhibits curator, Director of the Education Division, Microfilms Publications Coordinator, and Specialist in Women's History.

In 1976, four years before publishing her book with fellow NARA employee, Mabel Deutrich, Clio Was a Woman: Studies in the History of American Women (Harvard University Press, 1980), Purdy headed a Conference on Women's History in April 1976. Prior to this conference, NARA had identified only two sets of records that pertained to women's history: the records of the Women's Bureau and the Children's Bureau of the Department of Labor. Purdy knew that there were an abundance of records about women that existed and were simply forgotten or ignored. In her work of highlighting the importance of those records and make the agency, along with the archival community, understand the importance of women's history, she became renowned for her intersectional approach to women's history. Despite having such an influence on the historiography of women's history, the conference received only a "passing mention" in NARA's annual report, "a sign that women's history still had a ways to go before it would be seriously considered a field of study." She published on the history of the NARA building and the history of women in the United States in addition to making contributions to theory and practice of archival management.

== Honors and awards ==
- Fellow, Society of American Archivists

== Bibliography ==
Clio was a woman : studies in the history of American women / edited by Mabel E. Deutrich and Virginia C. Purdy. Washington: Howard University Press, 1980. ["Papers and proceedings of the Conference on Women's History, April 22–23, 1976, the National Archives Building, Washington, D.C."]
