= Eugene A. Toepel =

20th century American politician and jurist

Wisconsin Circuit Judge for the La Crosse Circuit, Branch 2
- In office August 1, 1978 – July 31, 1983
- Preceded by: Transitioned from county court
- Succeeded by: Michael J. Mulroy

Member of the Wisconsin State Assembly from the La Crosse 2nd district
- In office January 5, 1953 – January 5, 1959
- Preceded by: Harry W. Schilling
- Succeeded by: Leland E. Mulder

Personal details
- Born: July 29, 1916 Bangor, Wisconsin, U.S.
- Died: July 27, 2006 (aged 89) De Pere, Wisconsin, U.S.
- Party: Republican
- Education: University of Wisconsin Law School
- Profession: Lawyer, politician, judge

Military service
- Allegiance: United States
- Branch/service: United States Army
- Years of service: 1942–1946
- Battles/wars: World War II

Eugene A. Toepel (July 29, 1916 – July 27, 2006) was an American lawyer, jurist, and Republican politician from La Crosse County, Wisconsin. He represented La Crosse County for three terms in the Wisconsin State Assembly (1953–1959), and then served five years as a Wisconsin circuit court judge.

== Biography ==
Born in Bangor, Wisconsin, Toepel graduated from the University of Wisconsin Law School in 1939. He served in the United States Army in Europe during World War II from 1942 to 1946, then served in the Wisconsin State Assembly from 1953 until 1957 as a Republican. In 1957, Toepel resigned from the Wisconsin State Assembly, when the Governor of Wisconsin Vernon Wallace Thomson appointed Toepel county judge (later Wisconsin Circuit Court judge) in La Crosse County, Wisconsin to fill a vacancy. Toepel served for 25 years until retiring. He died in De Pere, Wisconsin two days before his 90th birthday.

Wisconsin State Assembly
Preceded by Harry W. Schilling	Member of the Wisconsin State Assembly from the La Crosse 2nd district January 5, 1953 – January 5, 1959	Succeeded by Leland E. Mulder
Legal offices
New circuit established	Wisconsin Circuit Judge for the La Crosse Circuit, Branch 2 August 1, 1978 – July 31, 1983	Succeeded by Michael J. Mulroy
