= E. J. Kneen =

American politician

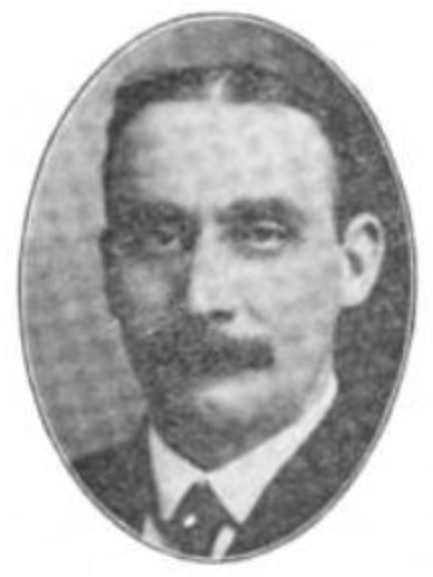

Member of the Wisconsin State Assembly
- In office 1908–1912
- Constituency: La Crosse County Second District

Personal details
- Born: Erving J. Kneen; February 24, 1867 Burns, Wisconsin
- Died: March 9, 1947 (aged 80) La Crosse, Wisconsin
- Party: Democrat
- Occupation: Merchant, politician

Erving J. Kneen (February 24, 1867 – March 9, 1947) was an American politician and a member of the Wisconsin State Assembly.

== Biography ==
E. J. Kneen was born in Burns, Wisconsin on February 24, 1867. He attended school in Bangor.

He died at his home in La Crosse on March 9, 1947.

== Career ==
Kneen was elected to the Assembly in 1908, and reelected in 1910. Additionally, he was President of Bangor, Wisconsin. He was a Democrat.
