= Lester Trimble =

American classical composer

Lester Albert Trimble (August 29, 1923 Bangor, Wisconsin – December 31, 1986 New York City) was an American music critic and composer of contemporary classical music.

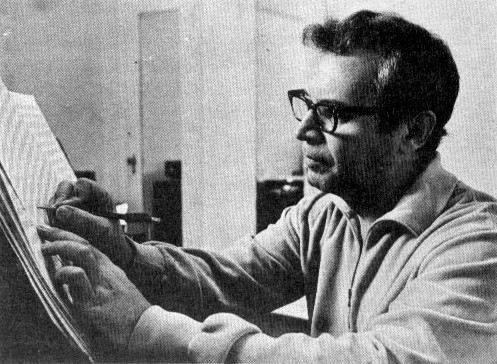
Lester Trimble

Encouraged by Schoenberg, who had seen some of his scores, Trimble entered the Carnegie Institute of Technology (now Carnegie Mellon University). While there he studied with Nikolai Lopatnikoff and Frederick Dorian and wrote music criticism for the Pittsburgh Post-Gazette. He earned a Bachelor of Fine Arts in violin and composition from Carnegie in 1948, followed by a Masters in composition. During this time he also spent summers at the Berkshire Music Center at Tanglewood where he studied with Darius Milhaud and Aaron Copland. In 1950, Trimble went to Paris where he continued studies with Nadia Boulanger and Arthur Honegger. He returned from Paris in 1952 and settled in New York, where he was engaged by Virgil Thomson as a critic for the New York Herald Tribune, a post he held for ten years. Trimble was also the music critic for The Nation (1957–62), the Washington Evening Star (1963–8) and Stereo Review (1968–74). He became the managing editor of Musical America from 1960 to 1961 and executive director of the American Music Center from 1961 to 1963. In 1963 he was appointed professor of composition at the University of Maryland, a position he held for five years. In 1967 he was appointed composer-in-residence with the New York Philharmonic by Leonard Bernstein. In 1971 he joined the faculty of the Juilliard School and in 1973 he became the first composer-in-residence at Wolf Trap Farm Park.

Trimble's numerous compositions include symphonic works, chamber music pieces, choral works, vocal art songs, film scores, solo instrumental works, and an opera. His music is published by ACA, Belwin-Mills, Duchess, Leeds, C. F. Peters, and Presser. Some of his music is available in the Internet Archive.

== Bibliography ==
- Allen Hughes. The New Grove Dictionary of Opera, edited by Stanley Sadie (1992). ISBN 0-333-73432-7 and ISBN 1-56159-228-5
- Vinton, John ed. Dictionary of Contemporary Music, E.P. Dutton & Co., 1974, p. 767, ISBN 0-525-09125-4
