= Rockland, La Crosse County, Wisconsin =

Rockland, Wisconsin
- Village
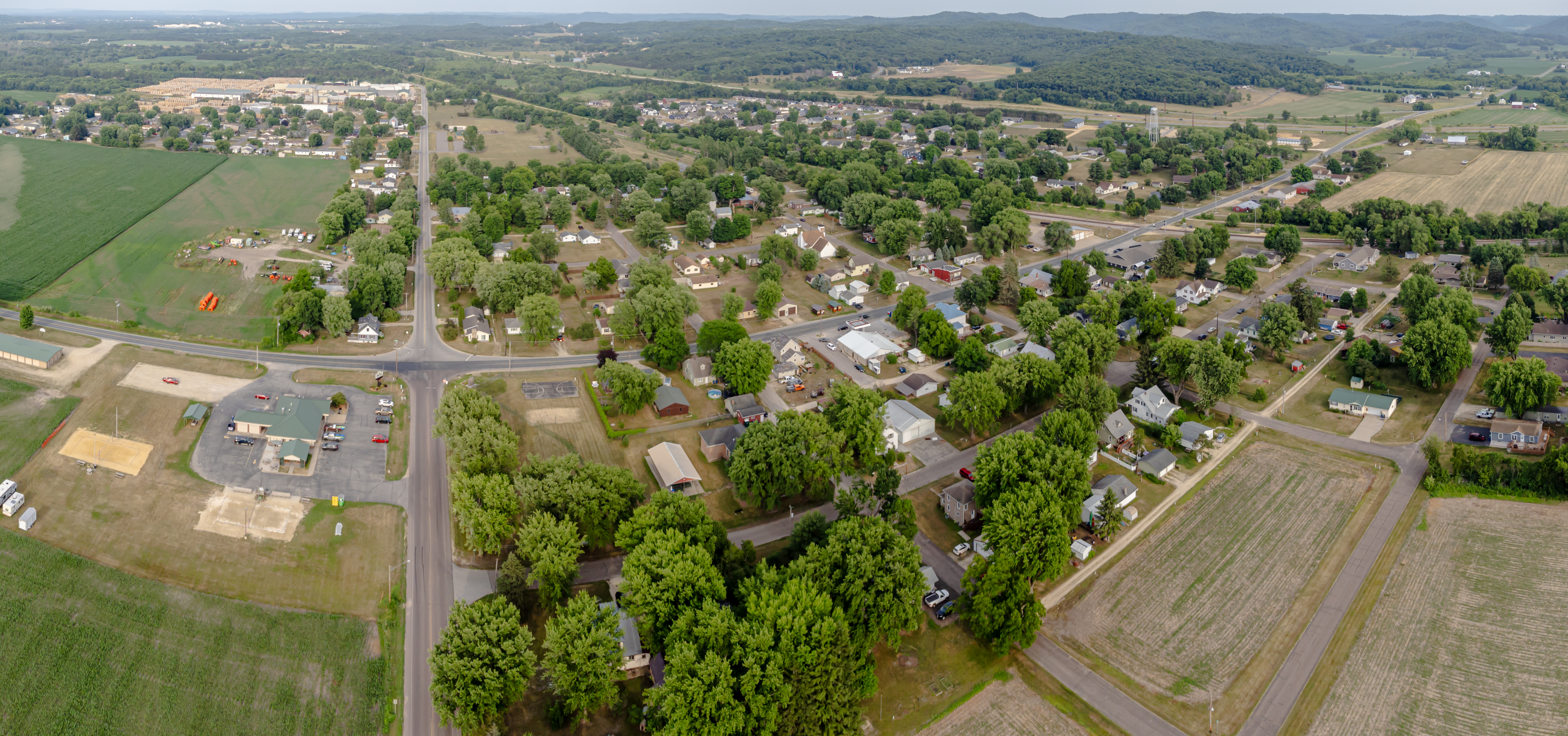

- Location of Rockland in Monroe County, Wisconsin.
- Coordinates: 43°54′22″N 90°55′6″W
- Country: United States
- State: Wisconsin
- Counties: La Crosse, Monroe

Area
  - Total: 0.66 sq mi (1.72 km^{2})
  - Land: 0.66 sq mi (1.72 km^{2})
  - Water: 0 sq mi (0.00 km^{2})
- Elevation: 750 ft (230 m)

Population (2020)
  - Total: 765
  - Density: 1,017.6/sq mi (392.88/km^{2})
- Time zone: UTC-6 (Central (CST))
  - Summer (DST): UTC-5 (CDT)
- Area code: 608
- FIPS code: 55-68900
- GNIS feature ID: 1572484
- Website: www.villageofrockland.org

Rockland is a village in eastern La Crosse County, Wisconsin, United States, along the La Crosse River. It is part of the La Crosse, Wisconsin Metropolitan Statistical Area. The population was 765 at the 2020 census.

== History ==
A post office called Rockland has been in operation since 1873. The village was named for the rocky land surrounding it, which includes the large rock in the village.

== Geography ==
Rockland is located at 43°54′22″N 90°55′6″W (43.906115, -90.918369).

According to the United States Census Bureau, the village has a total area of 0.58 square miles (1.50 km^{2}), all land.

== Demographics ==
Historical population
Census	Pop.	Note	%±
1920	164		—
1930	190		15.9%
1940	171		−10.0%
1950	216		26.3%
1960	257		19.0%
1970	278		8.2%
1980	383		37.8%
1990	509		32.9%
2000	628		23.4%
2010	594		−5.4%
2020	765		28.8%
U.S. Decennial Census

=== 2010 census ===
As of the census of 2010, there were 594 people, 228 households, and 157 families residing in the village. The population density was 1,024.1 inhabitants per square mile (395.4/km^{2}). There were 243 housing units at an average density of 419.0 units per square mile (161.8 units/km^{2}). The racial makeup of the village was 93.9% White, 2.0% African American, 0.5% Native American, 2.7% Asian, 0.2% from other races, and 0.7% from two or more races. Hispanic or Latino of any race were 0.7% of the population.

There were 228 households, of which 36.0% had children under the age of 18 living with them, 57.0% were married couples living together, 7.9% had a female householder with no husband present, 3.9% had a male householder with no wife present, and 31.1% were non-families. 22.8% of all households were made up of individuals, and 9.7% had someone living alone who was 65 years of age or older. The average household size was 2.61 and the average family size was 3.13.

The median age in the village was 37 years. 25.8% of residents were under the age of 18; 8.1% were between the ages of 18 and 24; 27.9% were from 25 to 44; 28.7% were from 45 to 64; and 9.4% were 65 years of age or older. The gender makeup of the village was 55.1% male and 44.9% female.

=== 2000 census ===
As of the census of 2000, there were 628 people, 213 households, and 166 families residing in Rockland. The population density was 1,156.4 people per square mile (446.5 people/km^{2}). There were 216 housing units at an average density of 397.7 units per square mile (153.6 units/km^{2}). The racial makeup of Rockland was 98.41% White, 0.16% African American, 0.16% Native American, 0.48% Asian, and 0.80% from two or more races. Hispanic or Latino of any race were 0.16% of the population.

There were 213 households, out of which 41.3% had children under the age of 18 living with them, 66.2% were married couples living together, 7.5% had a female householder with no husband present, and 21.6% were non-families. 18.8% of all households were made up of individuals, and 8.0% had someone living alone who was 65 years of age or older. The average household size was 2.82 and the average family size was 3.20.

In Rockland the population was spread out, with 29.3% under the age of 18, 6.7% from 18 to 24, 32.5% from 25 to 44, 22.1% from 45 to 64, and 9.4% who were 65 years of age or older. The median age was 34 years. For every 100 females, there were 115.1 males. For every 100 females age 18 and over, there were 123.1 males.

The median income for a household in Rockland was $46,429, and the median income for a family was $50,714. Males had a median income of $31,563 versus $20,357 for females. The per capita income for Rockland was $17,914. About 6.7% of families and 8.6% of the population were below the poverty line, including 15.6% of those under age 18 and none of those age 65 or over.

== Gallery ==
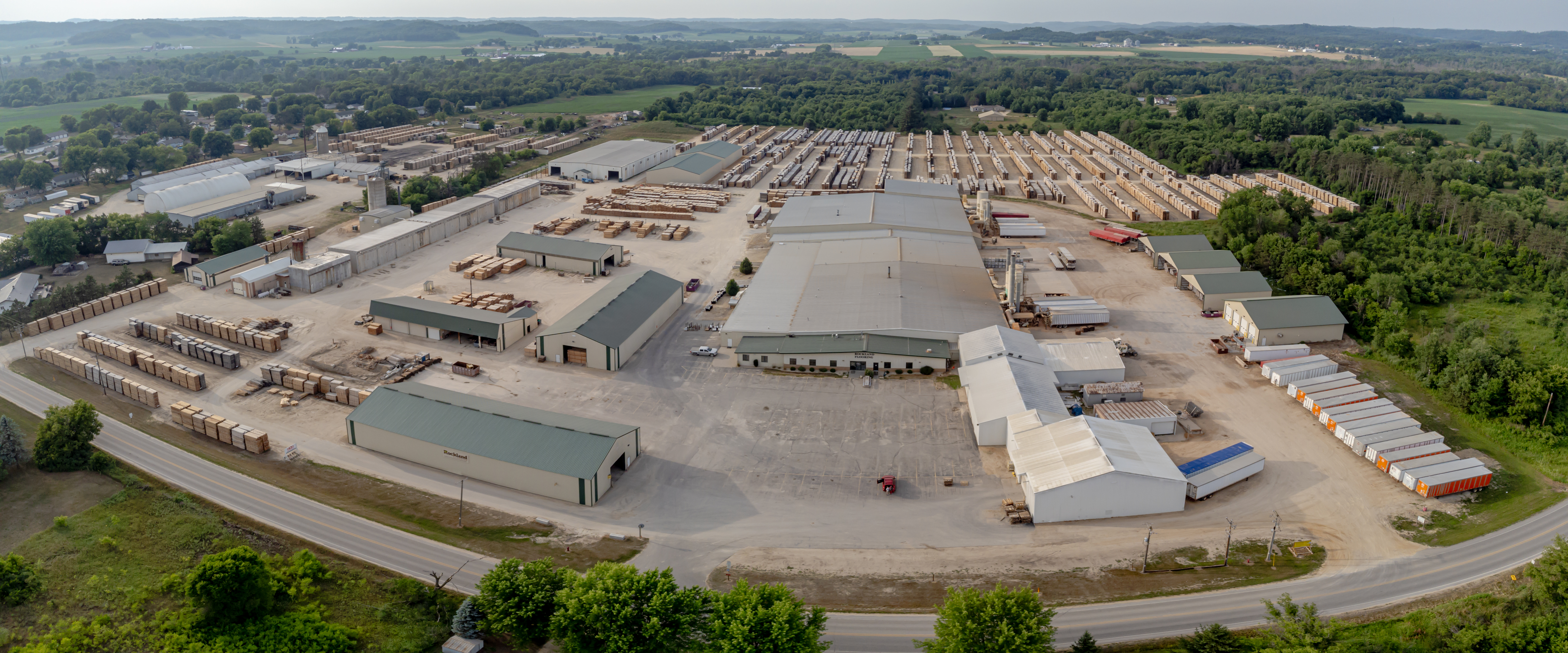
Rockland flooring

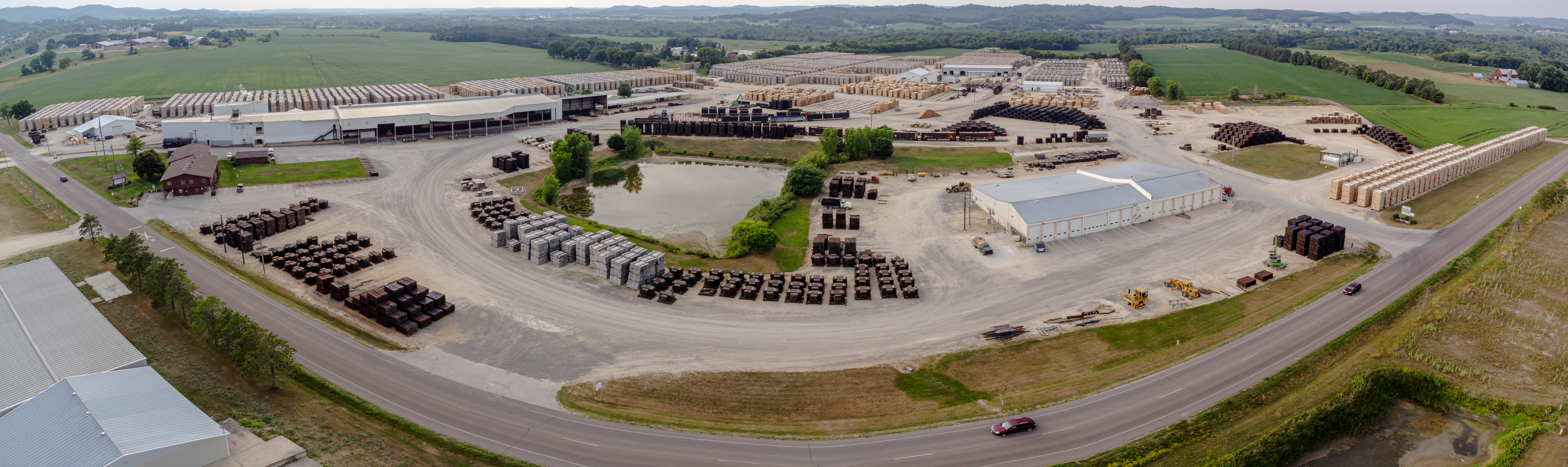
Stella Jones Corporation, they specialize in making railroad ties

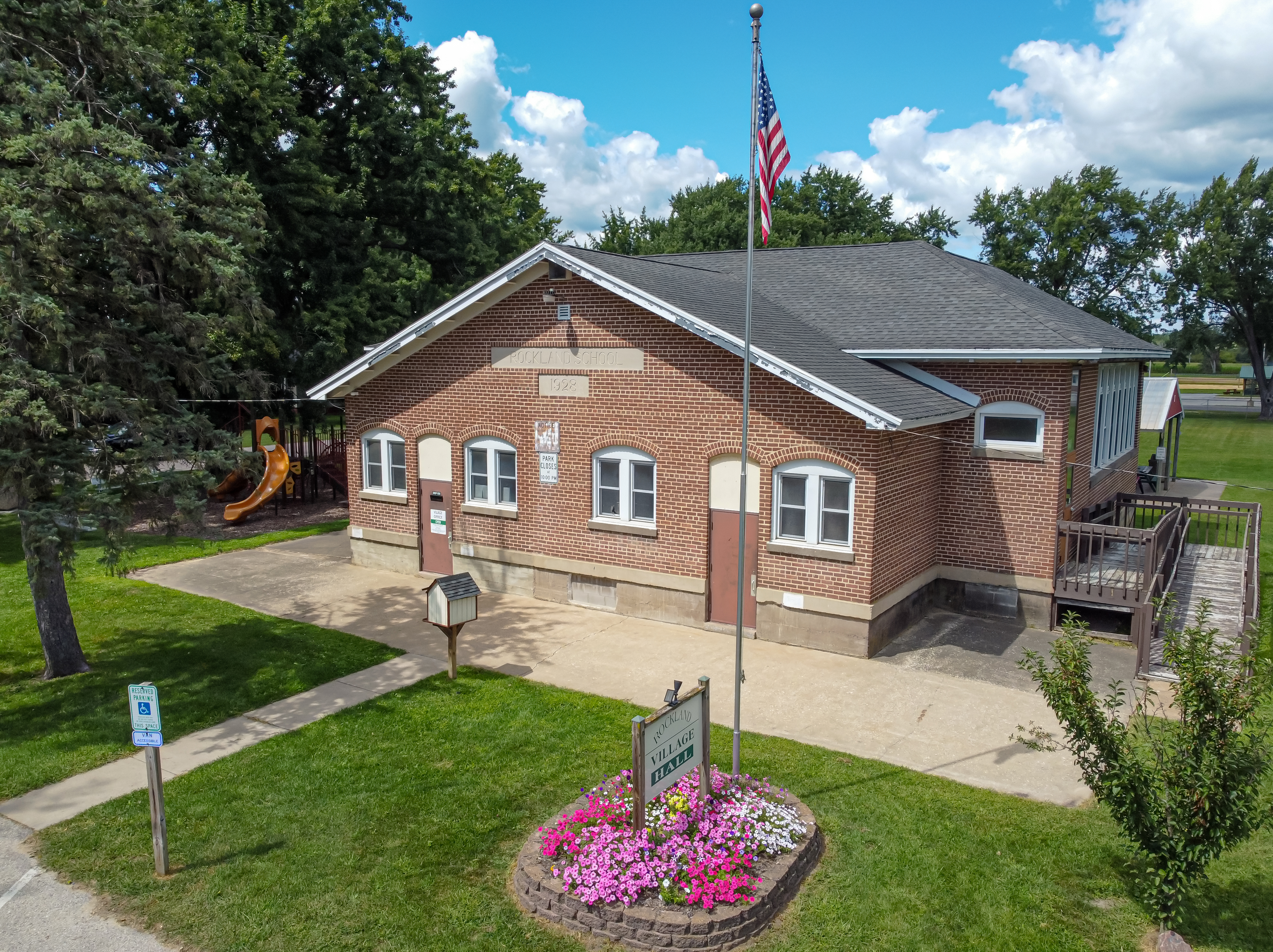
Rockland Village Hall

== See also ==
- Bangor, Wisconsin
