= Edward Weldon =

American archivist (1936–2022)

- Born: Edward LaRue Weldon; September 12, 1936; Miami, Florida
- Died: December 16, 2022 (aged 86)
- Education: Oberlin College; Emory University
- Occupation: archivist
- Employers: New York State Archives; National Archives and Records Administration; Georgia Archives

Edward Weldon (September 12, 1936 – December 16, 2022) was an American archivist and government administrator who served as the 37th president of the Society of American Archivists. He also served as editor of The American Archivist.

== Career ==
Edward Weldon was born in 1936 to parents George and Ruth Williams Weldon. He completed his undergraduate studies at Oberlin College in 1958. He then continued his studies at Emory University, completing a master's degree in 1963 and Ph.D. in history in 1970. His dissertation, "Mark Sullivan's Progressive Journalism, 1874–1925: An Ironic Persuasion," was based on the personal papers of Sullivan held by the Hoover Institution Library and Archives. While completing his doctoral studies, Weldon initiated his archival career as director of the Atlanta Regional Archives Branch of the National Archives and Records Administration (NARA) in 1969. Between 1971 and 1975 he led NARA's Editorial Branch, during which time he also served as editor of The American Archivist for the Society of American Archivists.

In 1974 Weldon was appointed the first state archivist for New York, and helped coordinate the opening of the New York State Archives in 1975. He then returned to NARA in 1980 where he served as Deputy Archivist of the United States for two years. In 1982 he returned to Atlanta, where he served as state archivist of Georgia between 1982 and 2000.

Throughout his career, Weldon was active in professional archival associations. He served on SAA Council, as editor of the Society's journal, and then as president between 1981 and 1982. Weldon was made a fellow of the Society in 1974. He also helped found the Society of Georgia Archivists in 1969, and served as its first president.
