= La Crosse River =

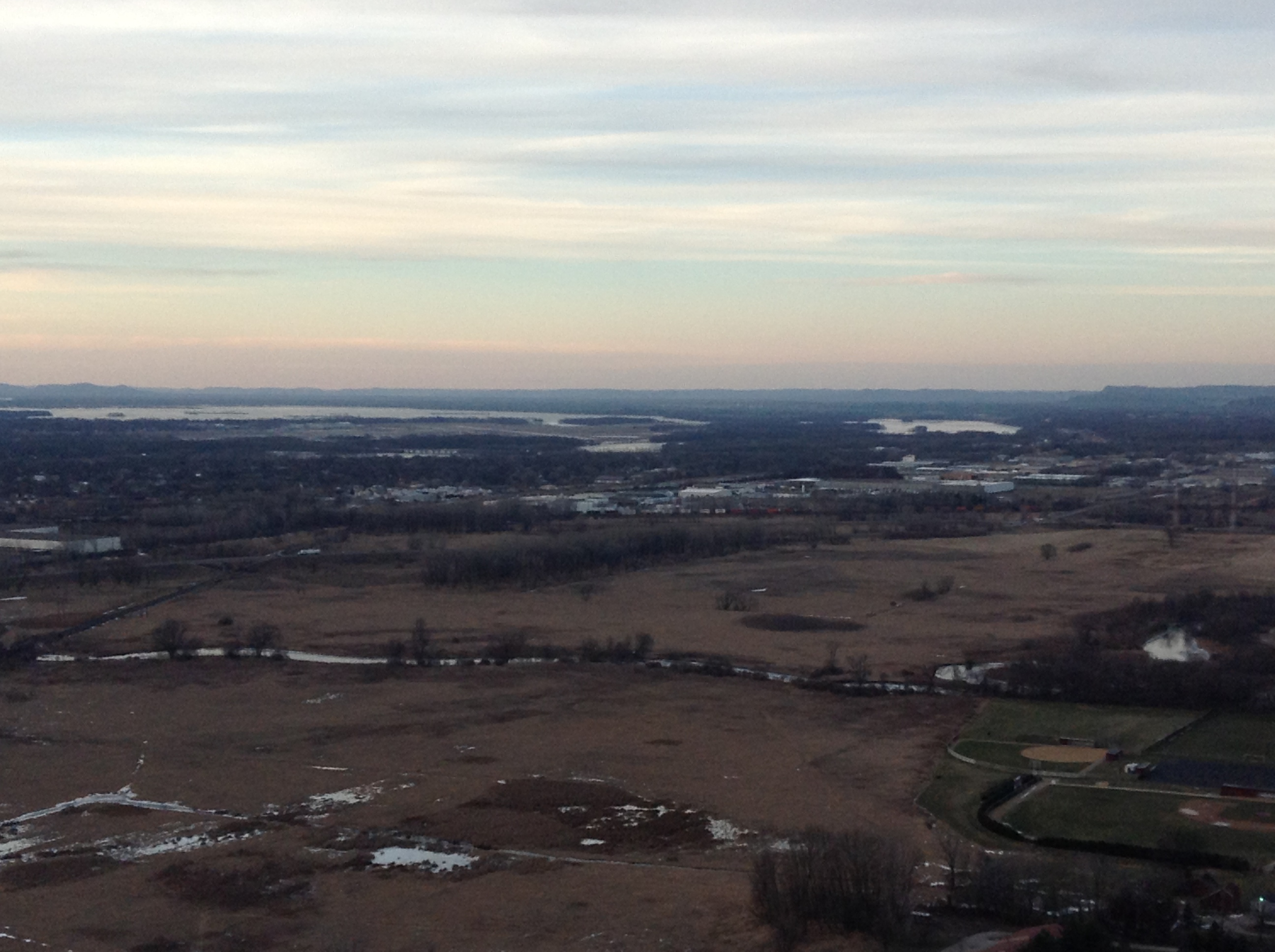
- La Crosse river running through a marsh in La Crosse, Wisconsin

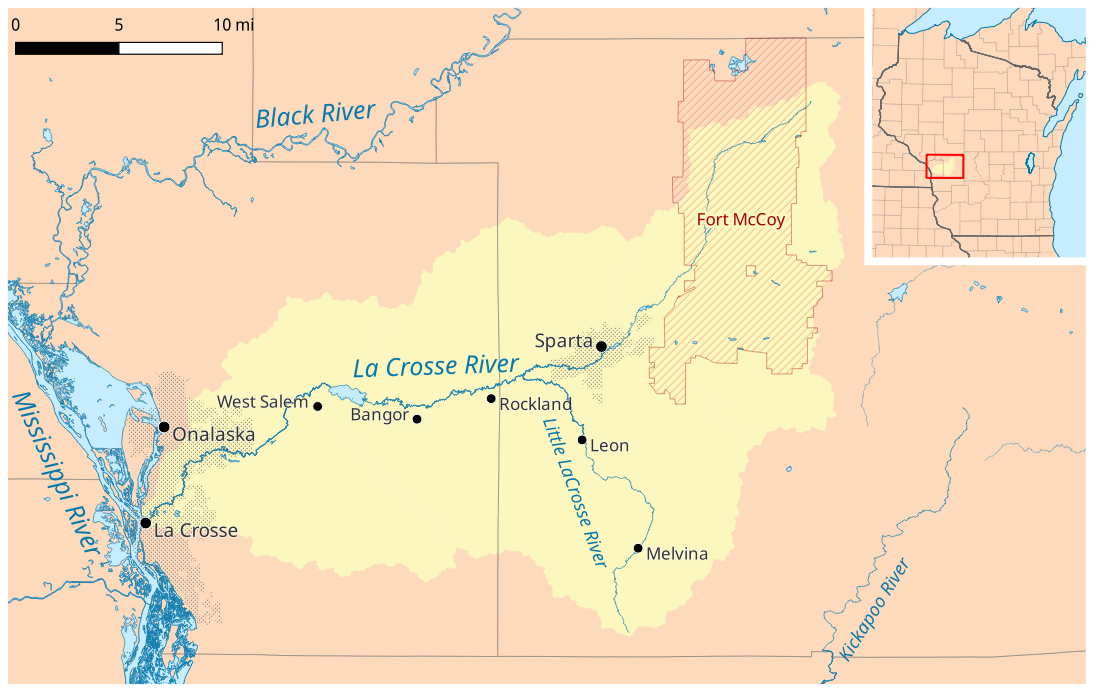
- La Crosse River watershed map

Physical characteristics
- Source
  - location: Grant, Monroe County, Wisconsin
  - coordinates: 44.1199632°N 90.5909671°W
- Mouth: Confluence with the Mississippi River
  - location: La Crosse, Wisconsin
  - coordinates: 43.8185774°N 91.2565261°W
  - elevation: 633 ft (193 m)
- Length: 61.3 miles (98.7 km)
- Basin size: Approximately 500 mi^{2} (1,300 km^{2})

Basin features
- River system: Mississippi River

The La Crosse River is a 61.3-mile-long (98.7 km) tributary of the Mississippi River in southwestern Wisconsin in the United States.

== Course ==
The La Crosse River rises in northern Monroe County and flows generally west-southwestwardly into La Crosse County, through the Fort McCoy military installation and past Sparta, Rockland, Bangor and West Salem. It flows into the Mississippi River at the city of La Crosse.

In Monroe County, it collects the short Little La Crosse River, which flows for its entire course in Monroe County.

Downstream of Sparta, the river is paralleled by the La Crosse River State Trail.

== Gallery ==
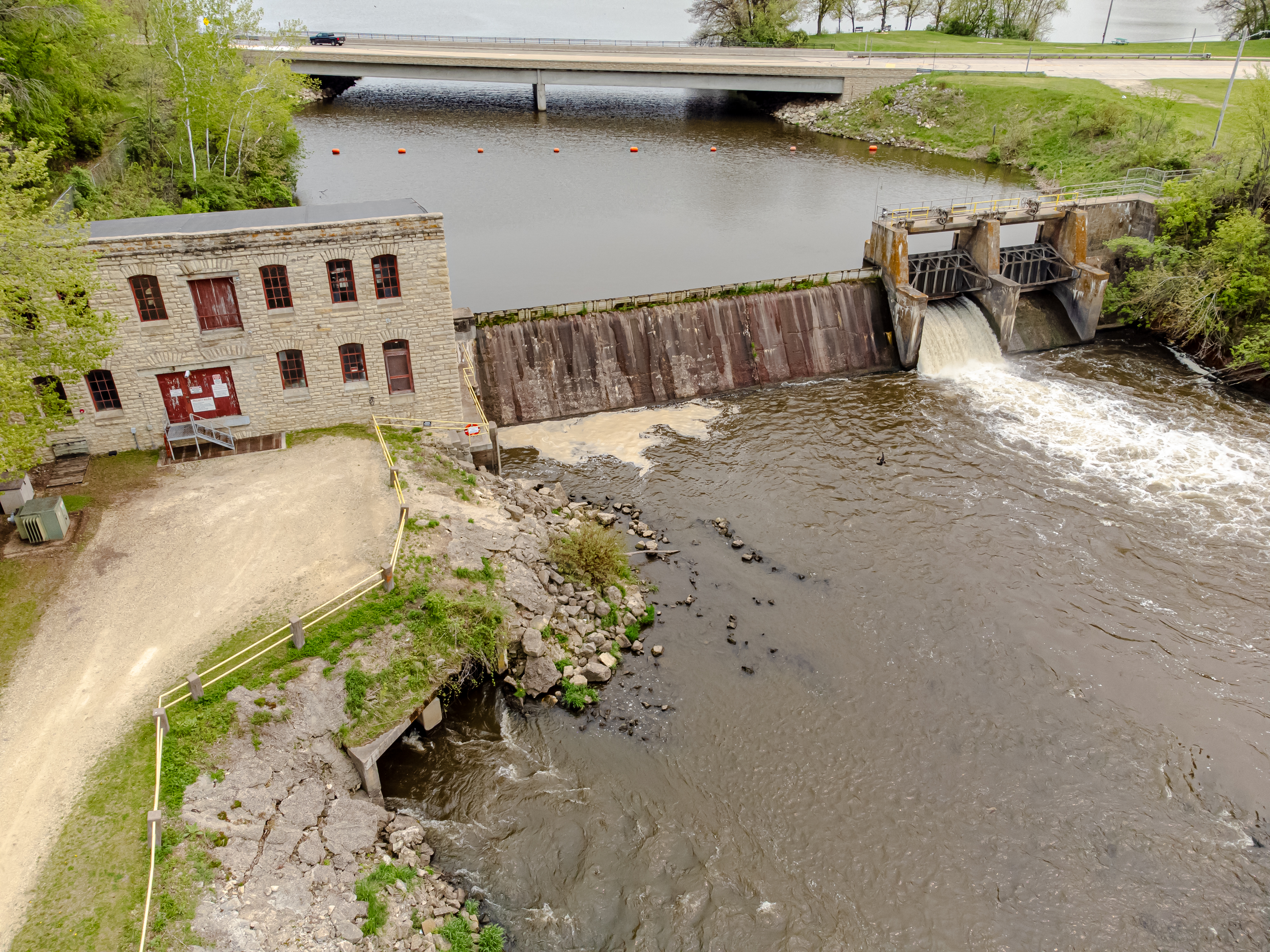
La Crosse River hydroelectric dam on Lake Neshonoc in West Salem

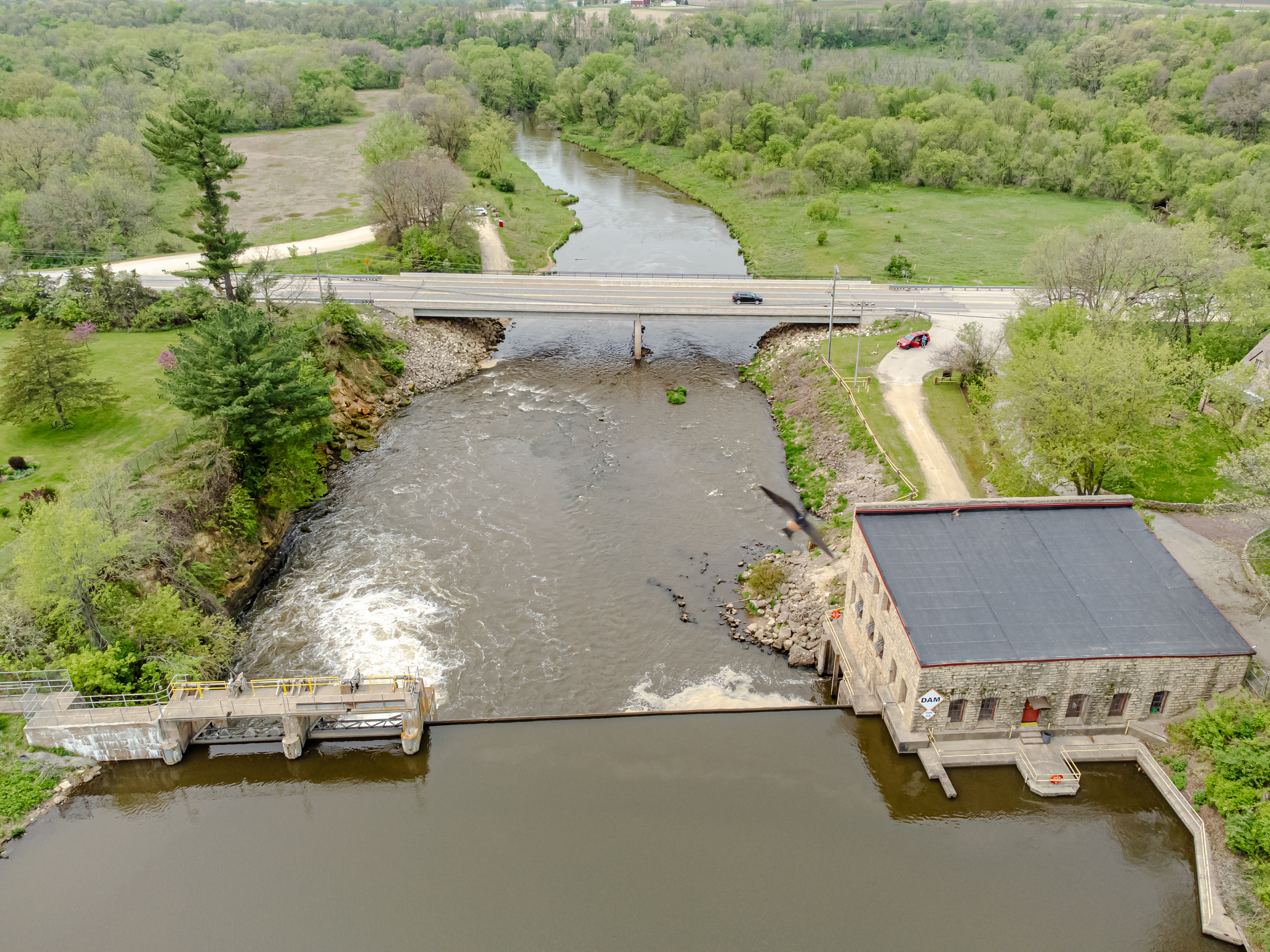
Looking downstream from Lake Neshonoc

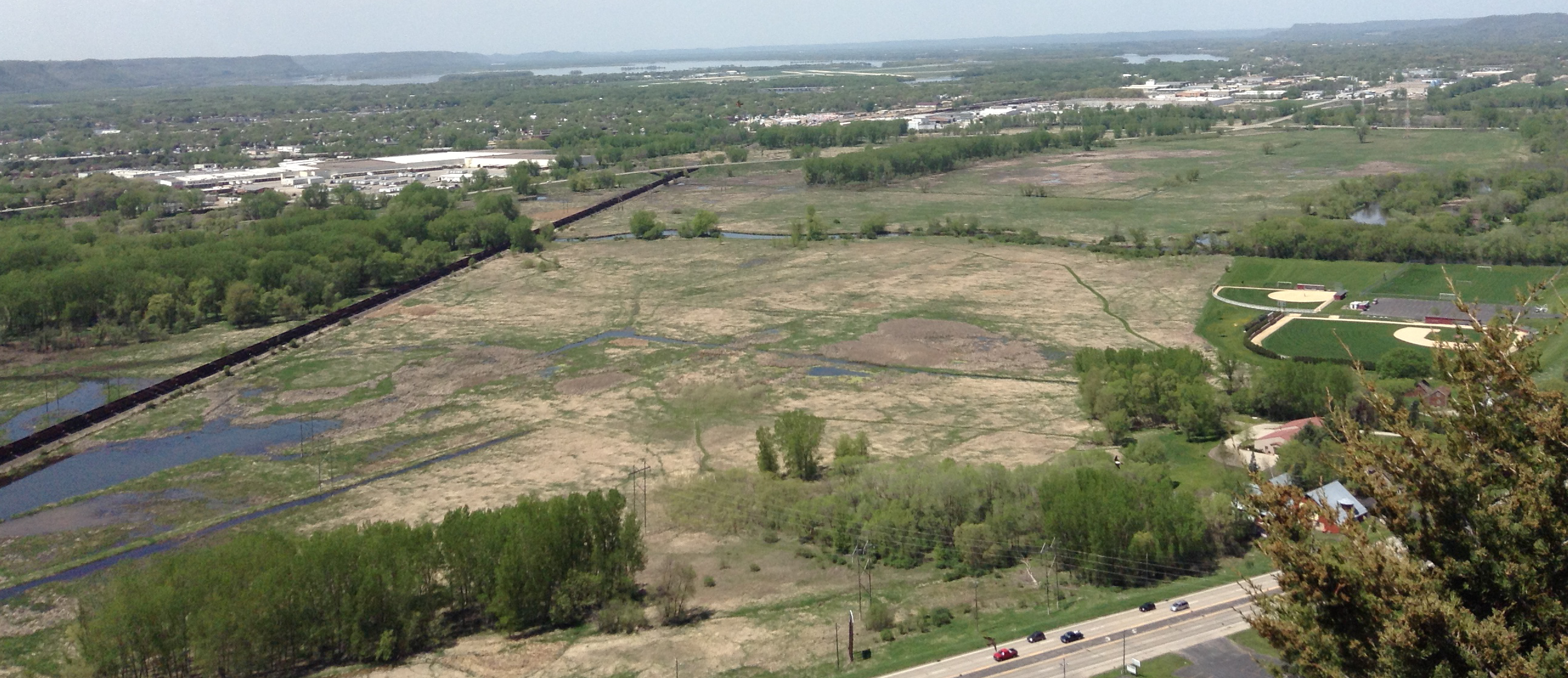
La Crosse river

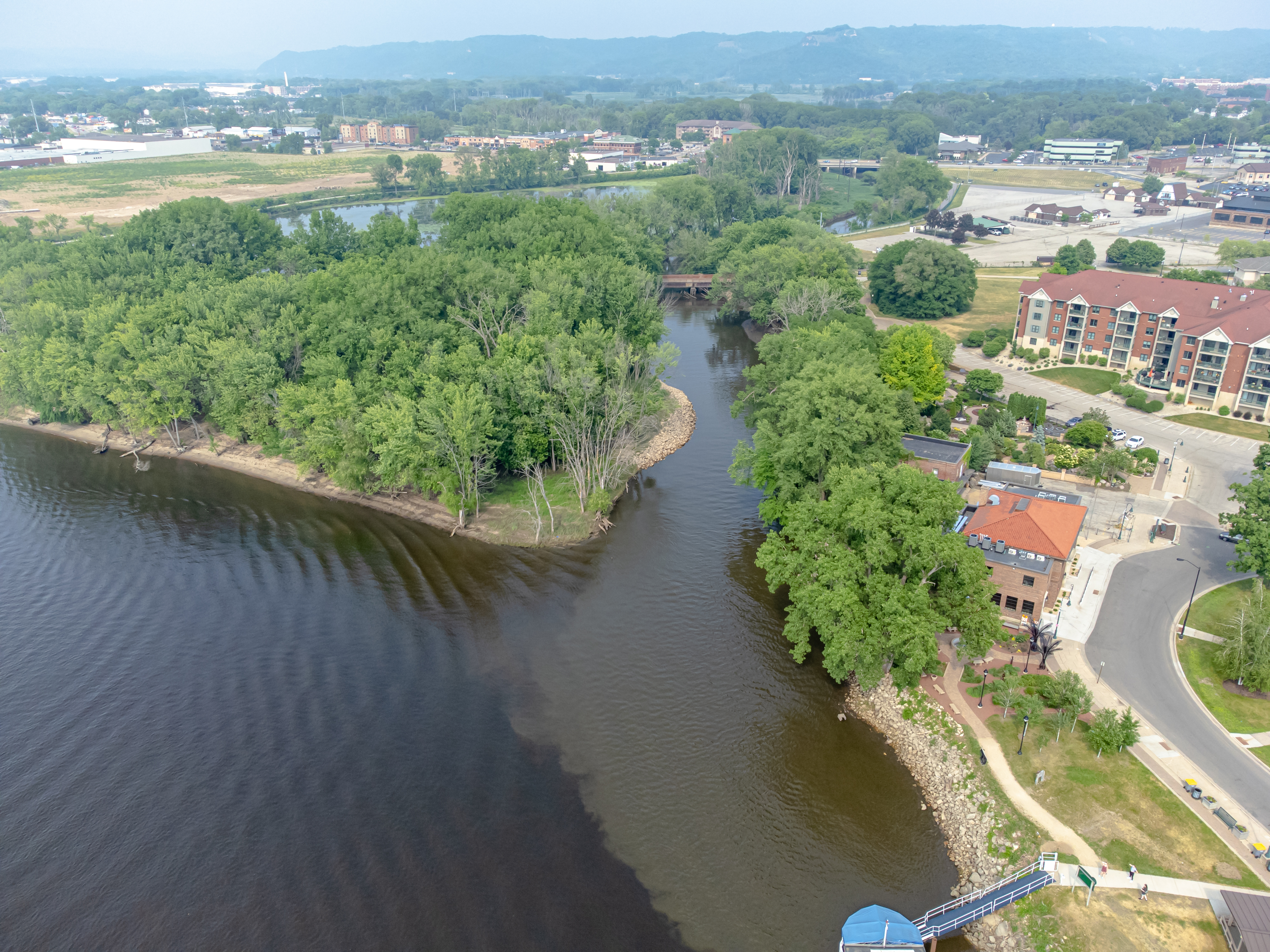
Confluence with Mississippi

== See also ==
- List of Wisconsin rivers

== Sources ==
- DeLorme (1992). Wisconsin Atlas & Gazetteer. Freeport, Maine: DeLorme. ISBN 0-89933-247-1.
- U.S. Geological Survey Geographic Names Information System: La Crosse River
