= American Archivist =

- Discipline: Archival science
- Language: English
- Edited by: Amy Cooper Cary

Publication details
- History: 1938–present
- Publisher: Allen Press for the Society of American Archivists (United States)
- Frequency: Biannually
- Open access: Delayed (after 3 years)

Standard abbreviations
- ISO 4: Am. Arch.

Indexing
- ISSN: 0360-9081
- LCCN: 40008025
- JSTOR: 03609081
- OCLC no.: 1479314

Links
- Journal homepage; Online access; Online archive

The American Archivist is a biannual peer-reviewed academic journal and the official publication of the Society of American Archivists. It covers theoretical and practical developments in archival science, particularly in North America. The journal contains essays, case studies, perspectives, and reviews of recent books and web resources. Contents are freely available to the public, except for the six most recent issues, which are viewable only to subscribers and society members. Online supplements are published irregularly and without access restrictions. Authors retain copyright of their work and license publication to the journal; the content is licensed under a Creative Commons Attribution Non-Commercial 3.0 United States License, except where otherwise noted.

== History ==
The American Archivist was first published in January 1938. It appeared quarterly until 1998, when it switched to a biannual rhythm. In 2011 the journal published its first online supplement, which featured content from the Society of American Archivist's 75th annual conference. The SAA began publishing with Allen Press in 2015.

== Editors ==
The following persons have been editors-in-chief of the journal:

- Theodore Calvin Pease, 1938–1946
- Margaret Cross Norton, 1946–1949
- Karl L. Trever, 1949–1956
- G. Philip Bauer, 1957–1959
- Ken Munden, 1960–1968
- Harold T. Pinkett, 1968–1971
- Edward Weldon, 1972–1975
- C.F.W. Coker, 1975–1978
- Virginia C. Purdy, 1978–1981
- Frank H. Mackaman, 1982
- Eva S. Moseley, 1982
- Harold P. Anderson, 1982
- J.R.K. Kantor, 1982
- Mary Elizabeth Ruwell, 1983
- Charles R. Schultz, 1983–1985
- Julia Marks Young, 1986–1988
- David Klaassen, 1989–1991
- Richard J. Cox, 1991–1995
- Philip B. Eppard, 1996–2005
- Mary Jo Pugh, 2006–2011
- Gregory S. Hunter, 2012–2018
- Christopher A. Lee, 2018–2020
- Amy Cooper Cary, 2021–present
