= Bangor, Wisconsin =

- Village
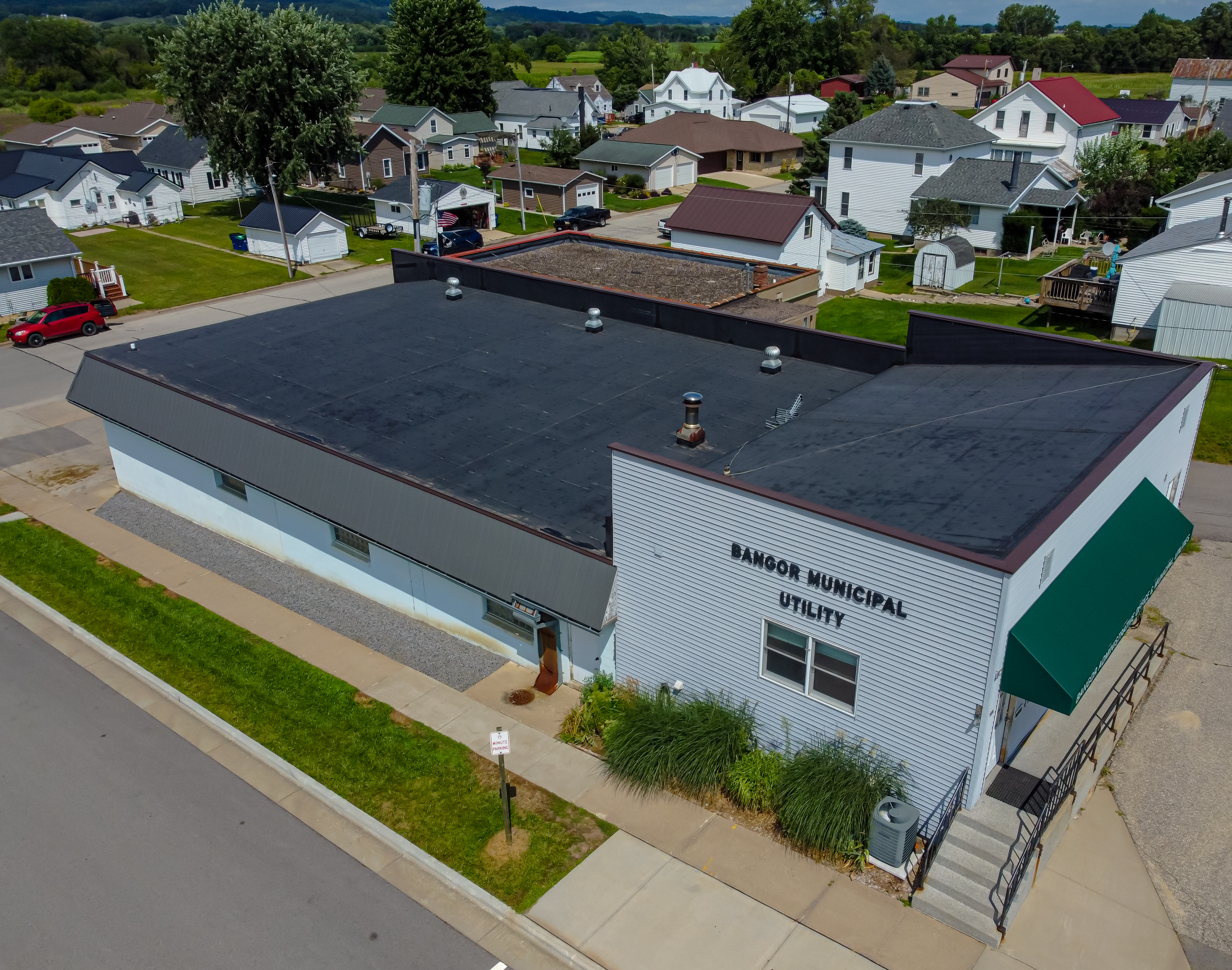
- Village hall

- Location in La Crosse County, Wisconsin
- Coordinates: 43°51′34″N 90°57′33″W
- Country: United States
- State: Wisconsin
- County: La Crosse

Area
  - Total: 1.68 sq mi (4.35 km^{2})
  - Land: 1.68 sq mi (4.35 km^{2})
  - Water: 0 sq mi (0.00 km^{2})
- Elevation: 784 ft (239 m)

Population (2020)
  - Total: 1,437
  - Density: 864.5/sq mi (333.78/km^{2})
- Time zone: UTC-6 (Central (CST))
  - Summer (DST): UTC-5 (CDT)
- Area code: 608
- FIPS code: 55-04575
- GNIS feature ID: 1582747
- Website: villageofbangorwi.gov

Bangor (/ˈbæŋɡɔːr/ BANG-gor) is a village in La Crosse County, Wisconsin, United States, along the La Crosse River. It is part of the La Crosse-Onalaska, WI-MN Metropolitan Statistical Area. The population was 1,437 as of the 2020 Census. The village is located partially within the Town of Bangor.

== History ==
The community was named after Bangor, Wales, because many of the early settlers were natives of Wales.

== Geography ==
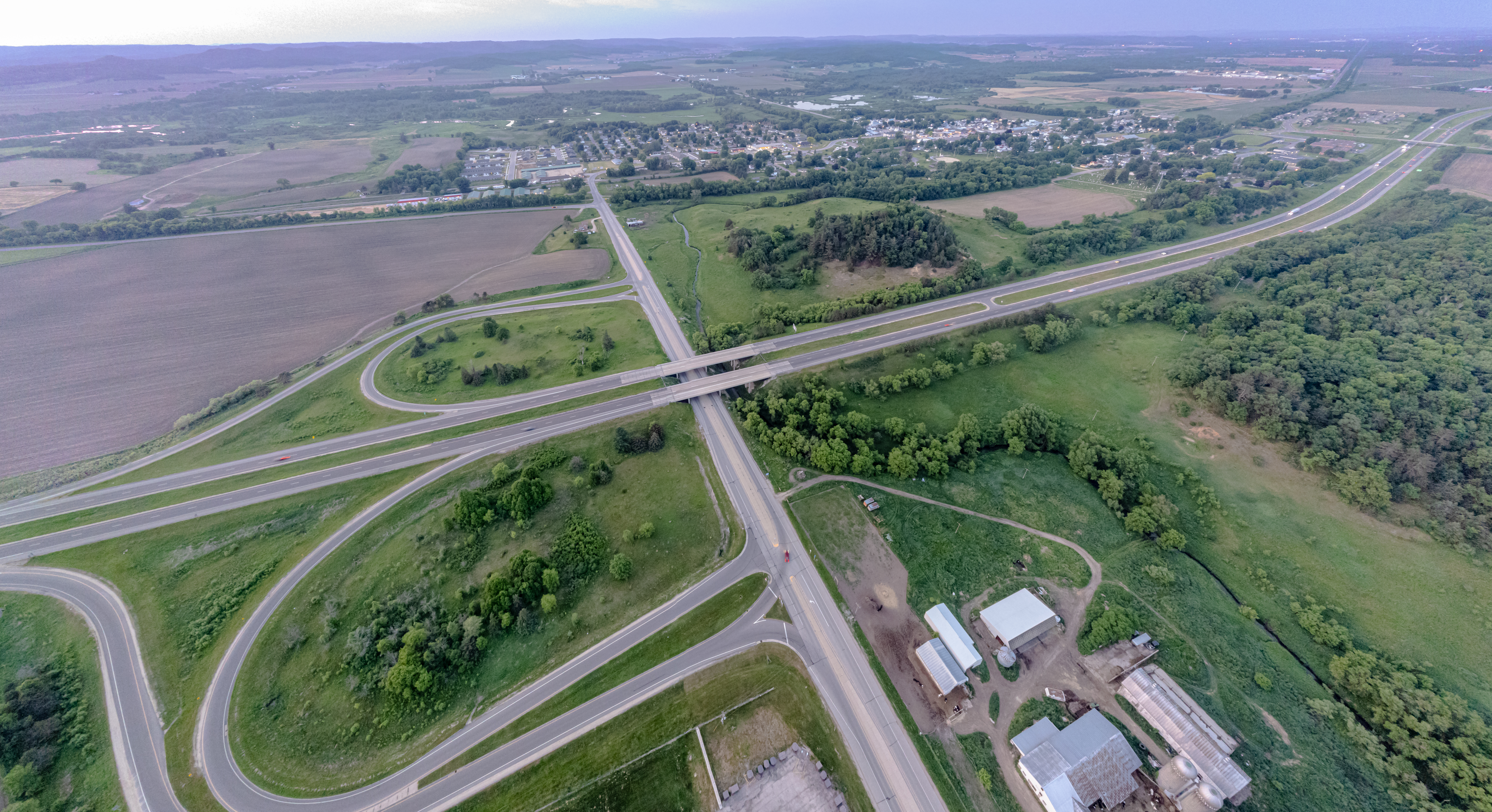
View of Bangor with I-90 in the foreground

Bangor is located at 43°53′29″N 90°59′24″W (43.891394, -90.990167).

According to the United States Census Bureau, the village has a total area of 1.23 square miles (3.19 km^{2}), all land.

== Demographics ==
Historical population
| Census | Pop. | Note | %± |
|---|---|---|---|
| 1880 | 453 | | — |
| 1890 | 499 | | 10.2% |
| 1900 | 633 | | 26.9% |
| 1910 | 692 | | 9.3% |
| 1920 | 854 | | 23.4% |
| 1930 | 835 | | −2.2% |
| 1940 | 847 | | 1.4% |
| 1950 | 941 | | 11.1% |
| 1960 | 928 | | −1.4% |
| 1970 | 974 | | 5.0% |
| 1980 | 1,012 | | 3.9% |
| 1990 | 1,076 | | 6.3% |
| 2000 | 1,400 | | 30.1% |
| 2010 | 1,459 | | 4.2% |
| 2020 | 1,437 | | −1.5% |
U.S. Decennial Census

=== 2010 census ===
As of the census of 2010, there were 1,459 people, 571 households, and 392 families residing in the village. The population density was 1,186.2 inhabitants per square mile (458.0/km^{2}). There were 597 housing units at an average density of 485.4 per square mile (187.4/km^{2}). The racial makeup of the village was 97.7% White, 0.5% African American, 0.6% Native American, 0.2% Asian, and 1.0% from two or more races. Hispanic or Latino of any race were 1.6% of the population.

There were 571 households, of which 39.6% had children under the age of 18 living with them, 53.2% were married couples living together, 10.7% had a female householder with no husband present, 4.7% had a male householder with no wife present, and 31.3% were non-families. 26.4% of all households were made up of individuals, and 13.3% had someone living alone who was 65 years of age or older. The average household size was 2.56 and the average family size was 3.11.

The median age in the village was 35.6 years. 29.5% of residents were under the age of 18; 6% were between the ages of 18 and 24; 29% were from 25 to 44; 21.9% were from 45 to 64; and 13.6% were 65 years of age or older. The gender makeup of the village was 50.4% male and 49.6% female.

=== 2000 census ===
As of the census of 2000, there were 1,400 people, 524 households, and 390 families residing in the village. The population density was 1,315.4 people per square mile (509.9/km^{2}). There were 546 housing units at an average density of 513.0 per square mile (198.9/km^{2}). The racial makeup of the village was 98.21% White, 0.29% Black or African American, 0.79% Native American, 0.29% Asian, 0.07% from other races, and 0.36% from two or more races. 0.64% of the population were Hispanic or Latino of any race.

There were 524 households, out of which 38.4% had children under the age of 18 living with them, 63.9% were married couples living together, 6.5% had a female householder with no husband present, and 25.4% were non-families. 21.4% of all households were made up of individuals, and 10.7% had someone living alone who was 65 years of age or older. The average household size was 2.65 and the average family size was 3.10.

In the village, the population was spread out, with 28.8% under the age of 18, 5.9% from 18 to 24, 31.1% from 25 to 44, 18.1% from 45 to 64, and 16.0% who were 65 years of age or older. The median age was 35 years. For every 100 females, there were 99.4 males. For every 100 females age 18 and over, there were 95.1 males.

The median income for a household in the village was $42,102, and the median income for a family was $46,058. Males had a median income of $30,787 versus $20,707 for females. The per capita income for the village was $17,648. About 4.7% of families and 6.3% of the population were below the poverty line, including 7.4% of those under age 18 and 11.7% of those age 65 or over.

== Education ==
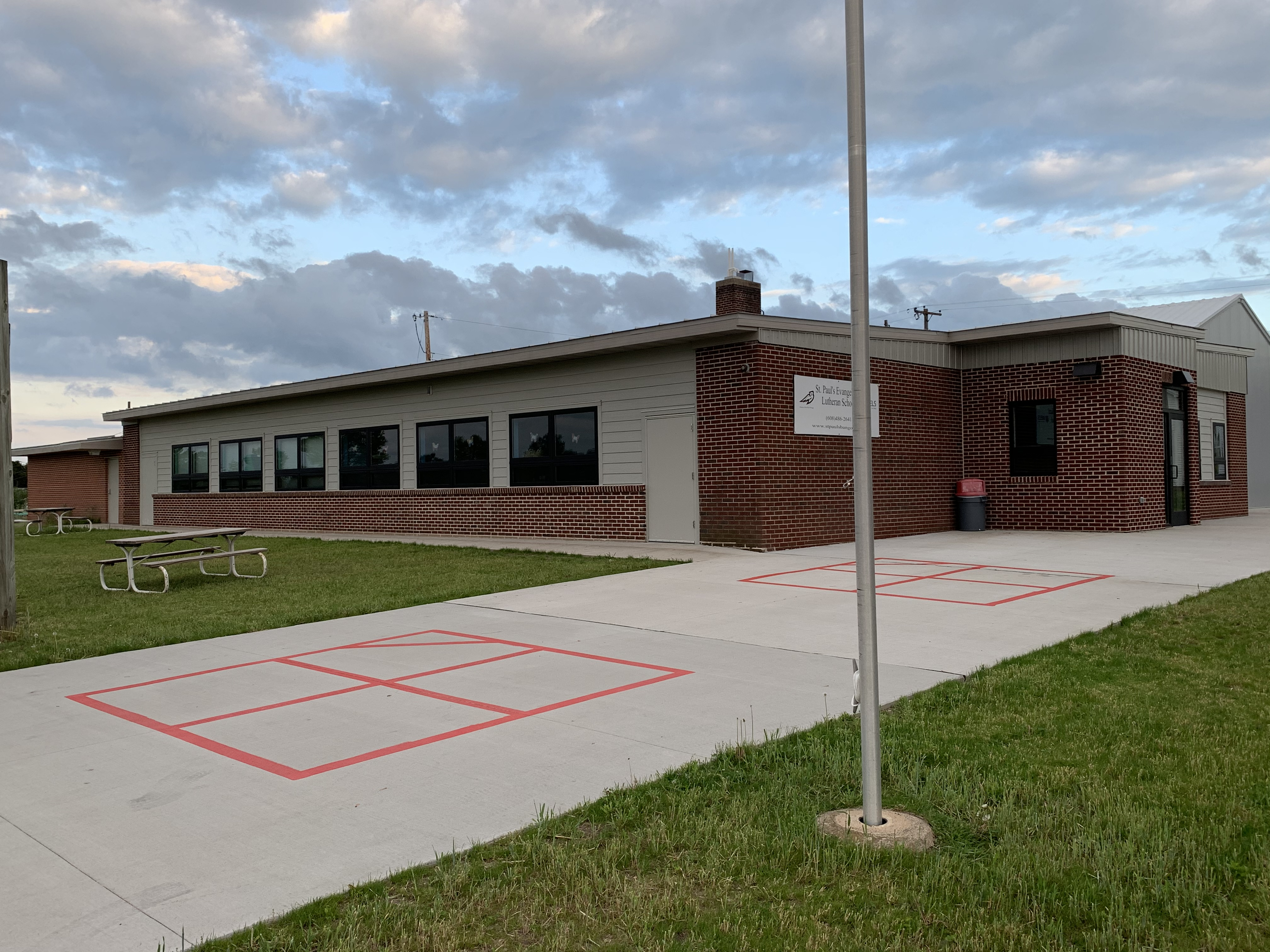
St. Paul’s Lutheran School

St. Paul's Lutheran School is a 4K-8 grade school of the Wisconsin Evangelical Lutheran Synod in Bangor.

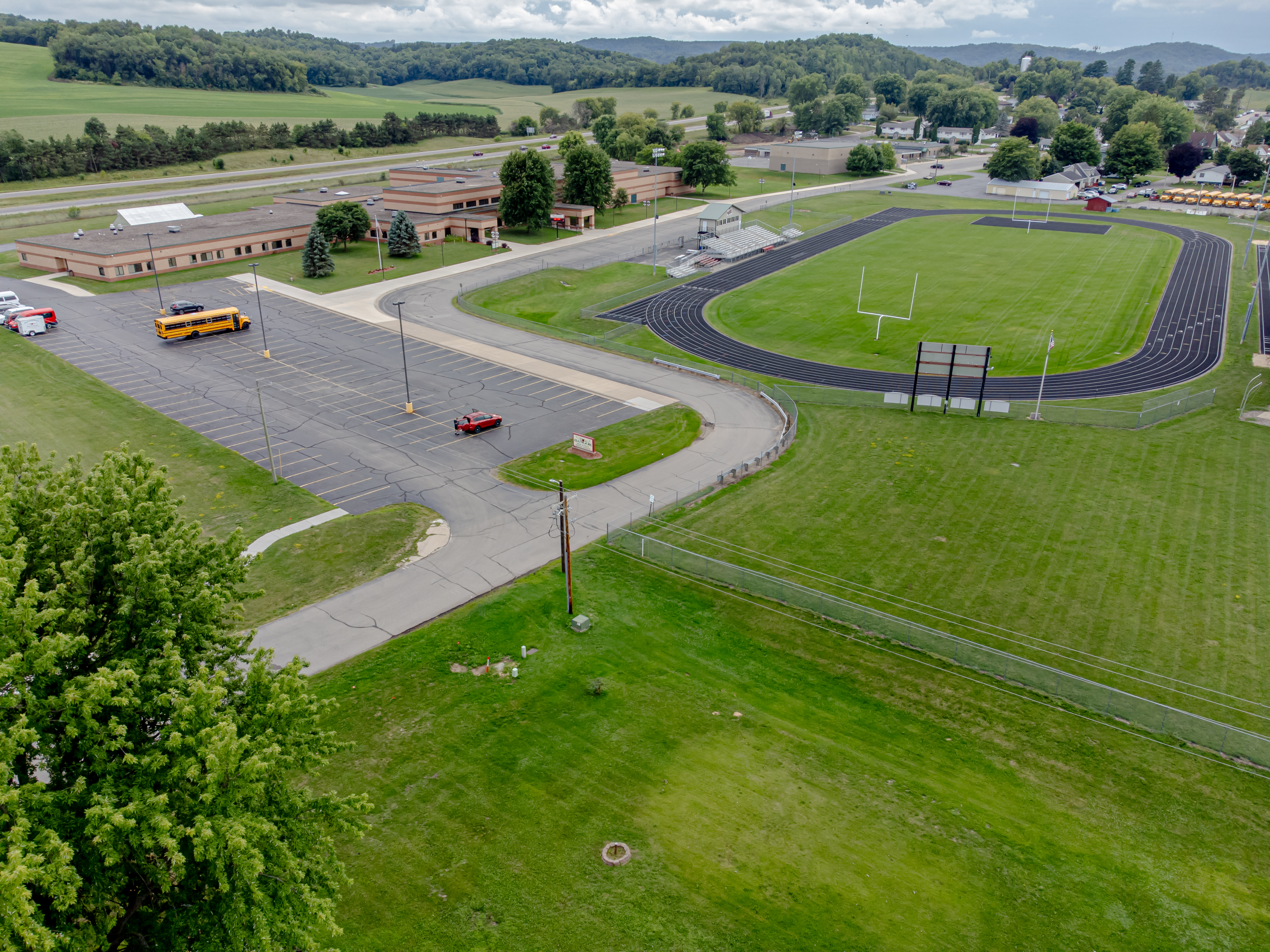
Bangor High School and Middle School

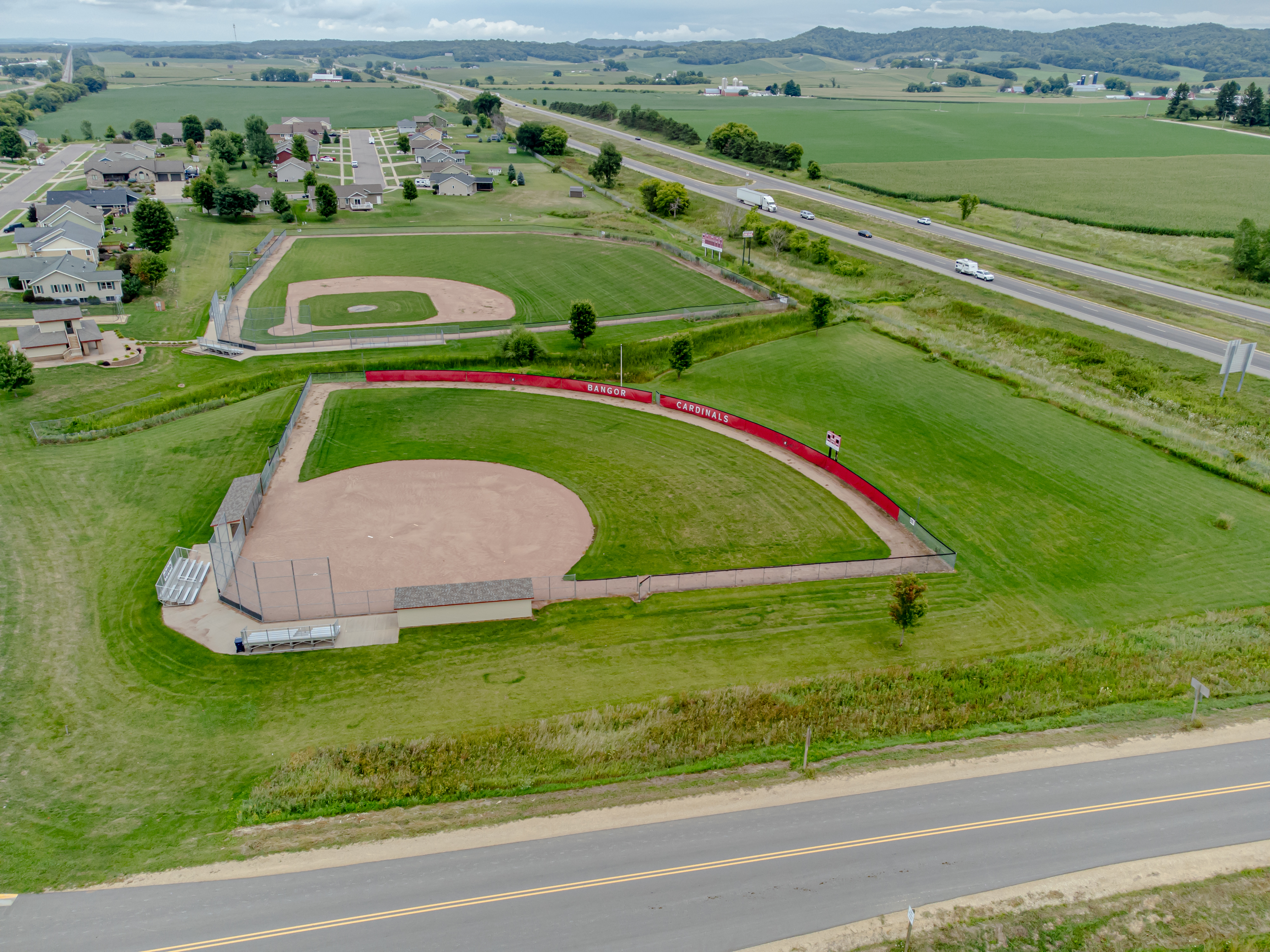
Bangor baseball and softball fields

== Notable residents ==
- E. J. Kneen, legislator
- Eugene A. Toepel, legislator and jurist
- Lester Trimble, composer (1923–1986)

== Gallery ==
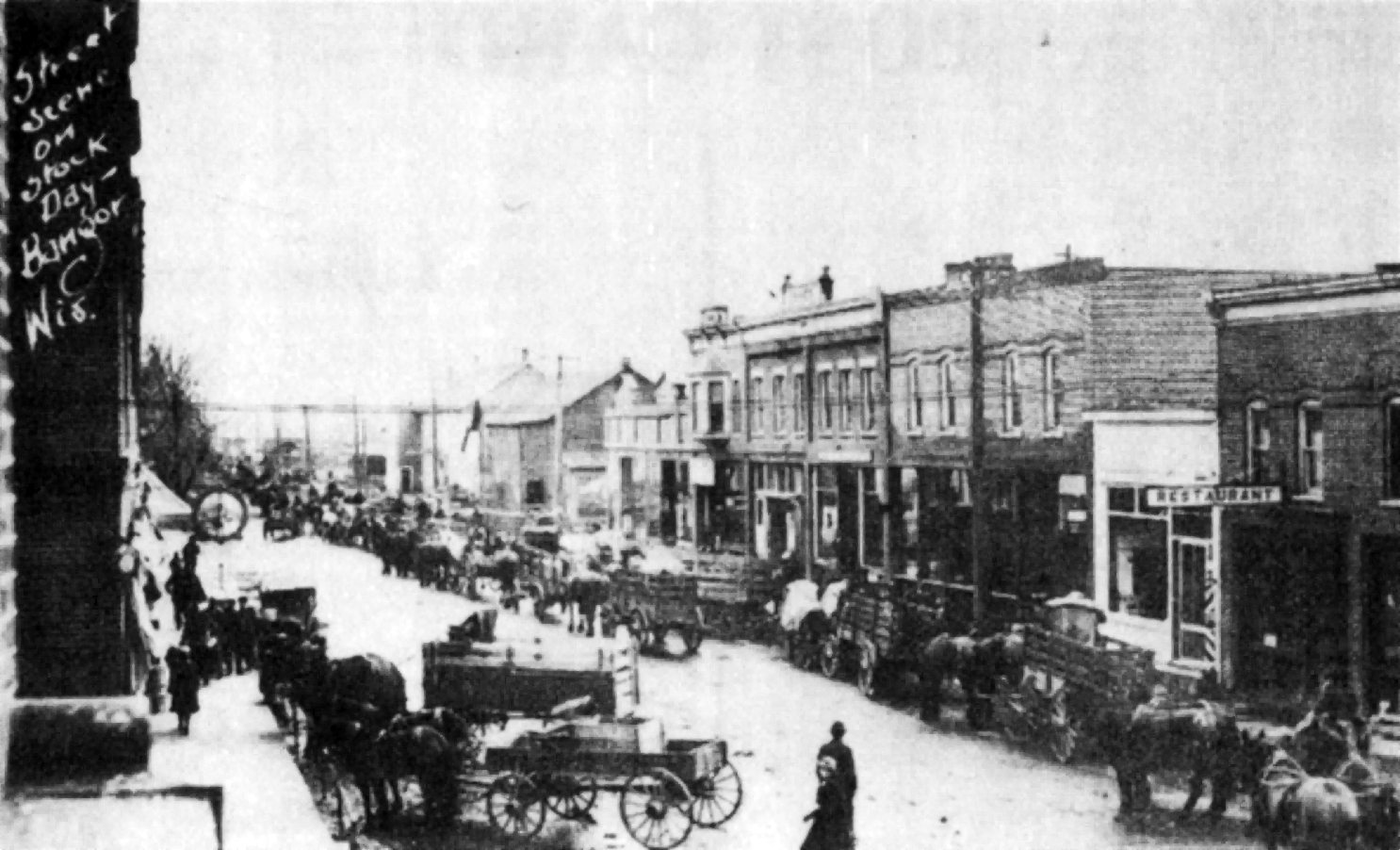
Commercial street scene on Stock Day, circa 1916

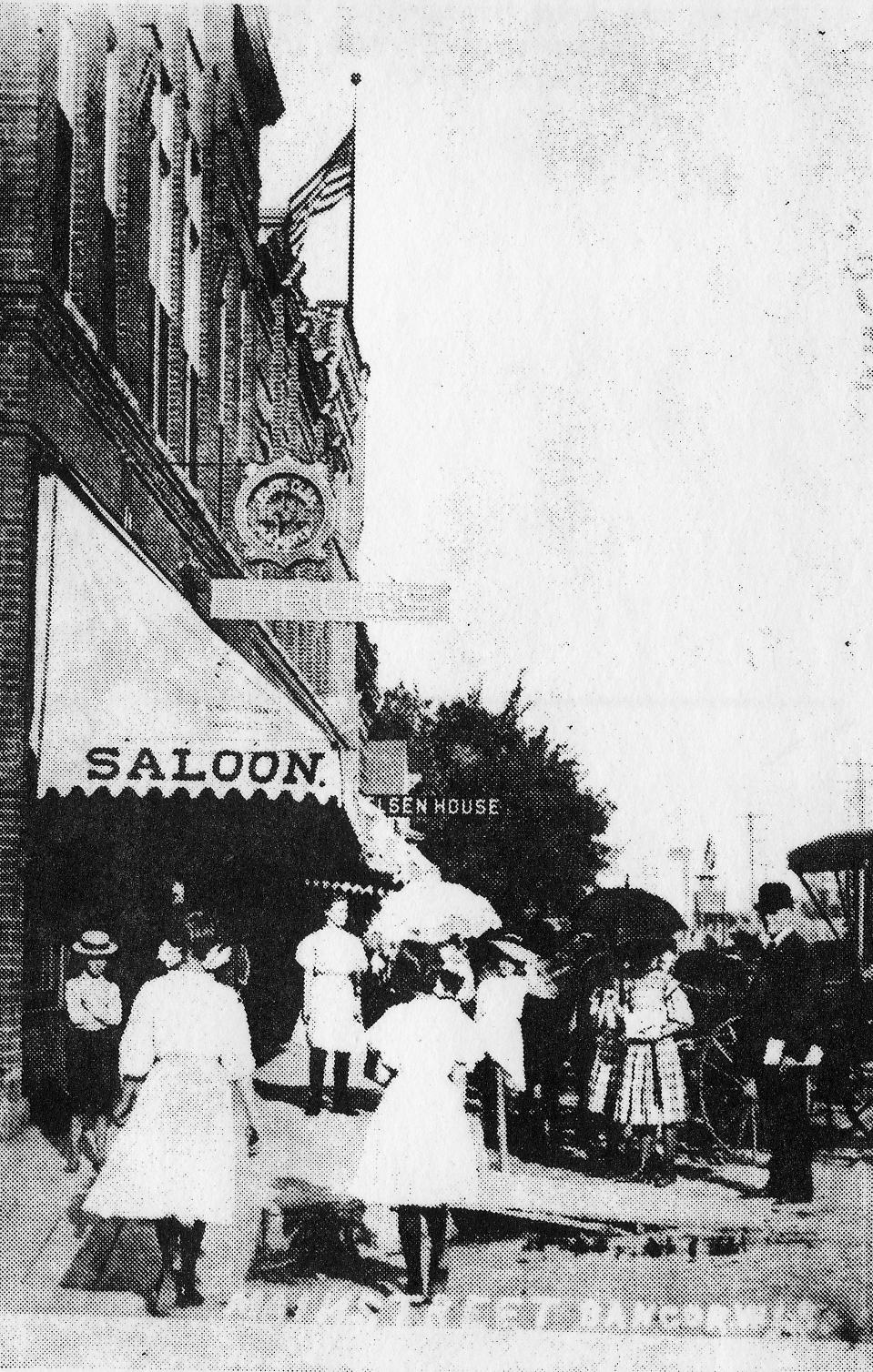
Commercial street scene, circa 1910

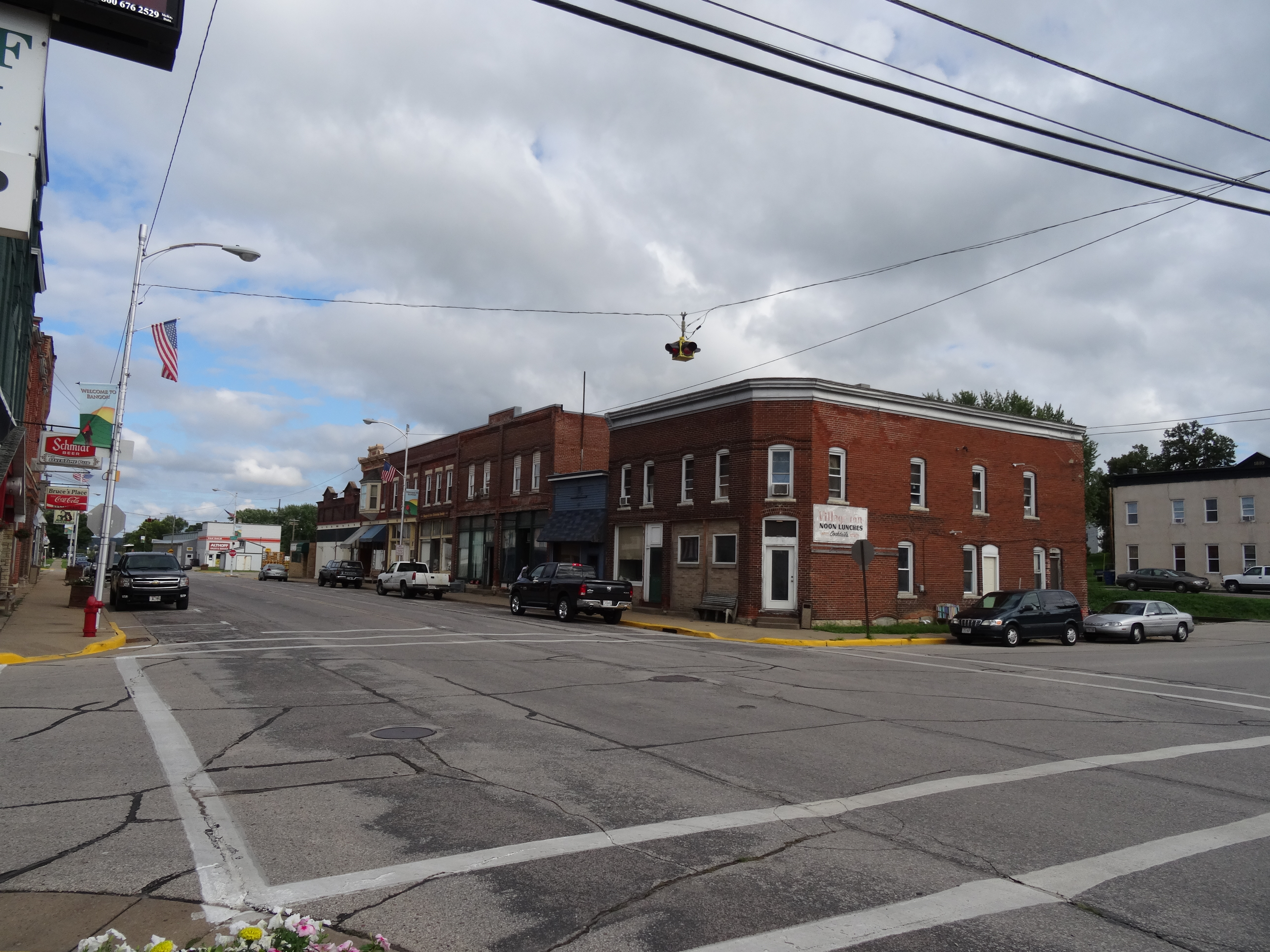
Commercial street scene, 2014

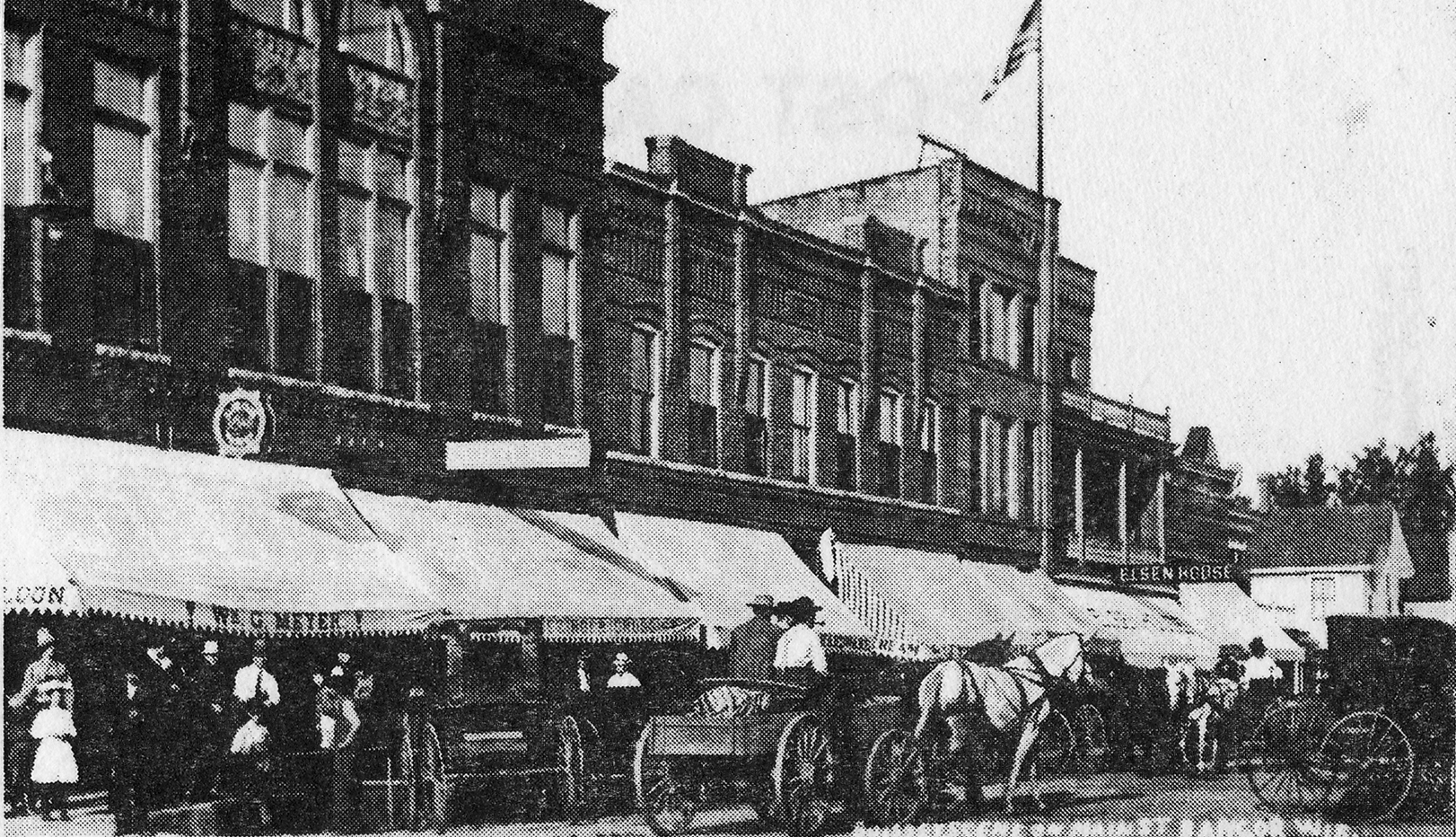
Bangor's Business District, circa 1902

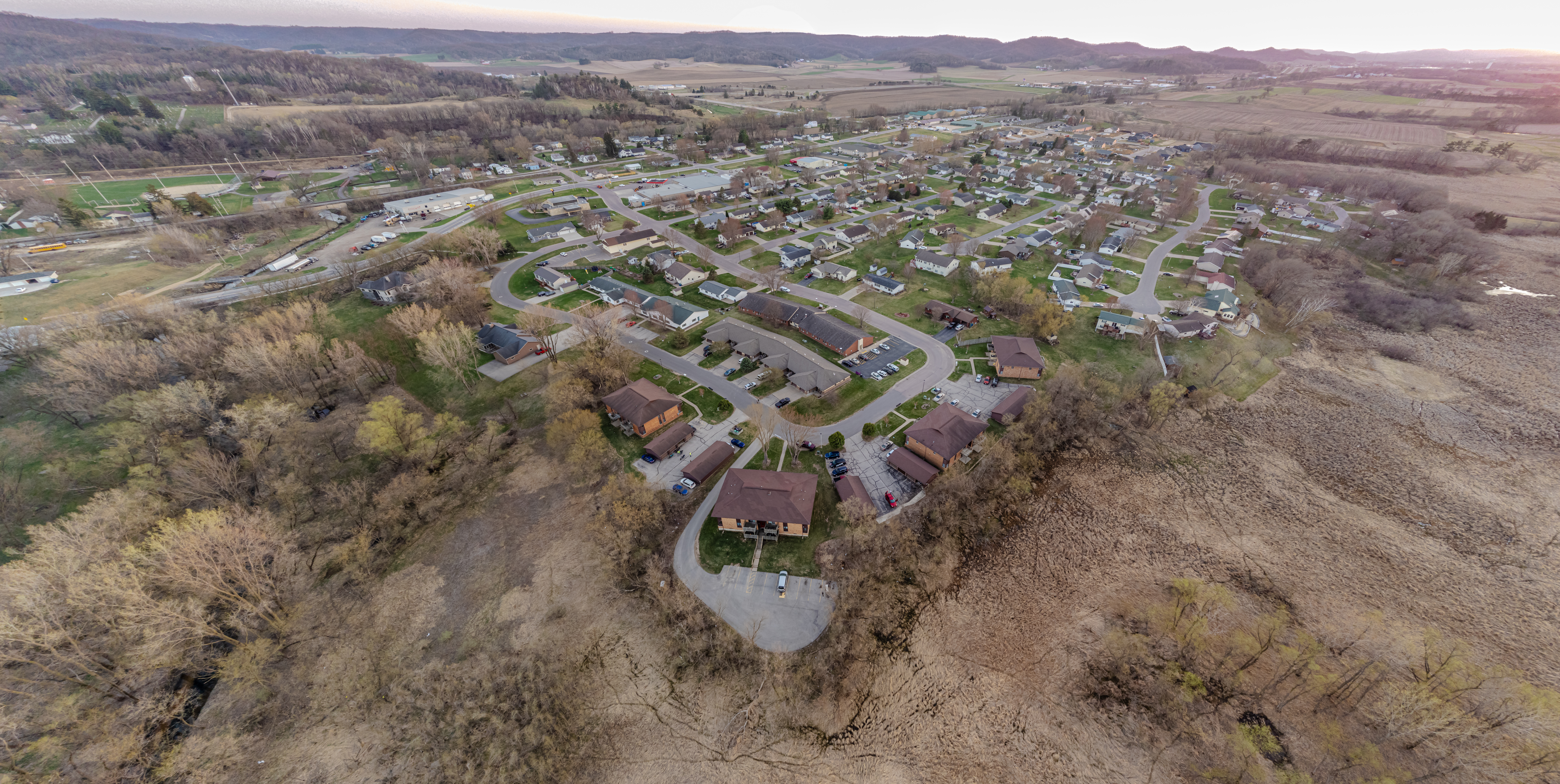
West side of Bangor

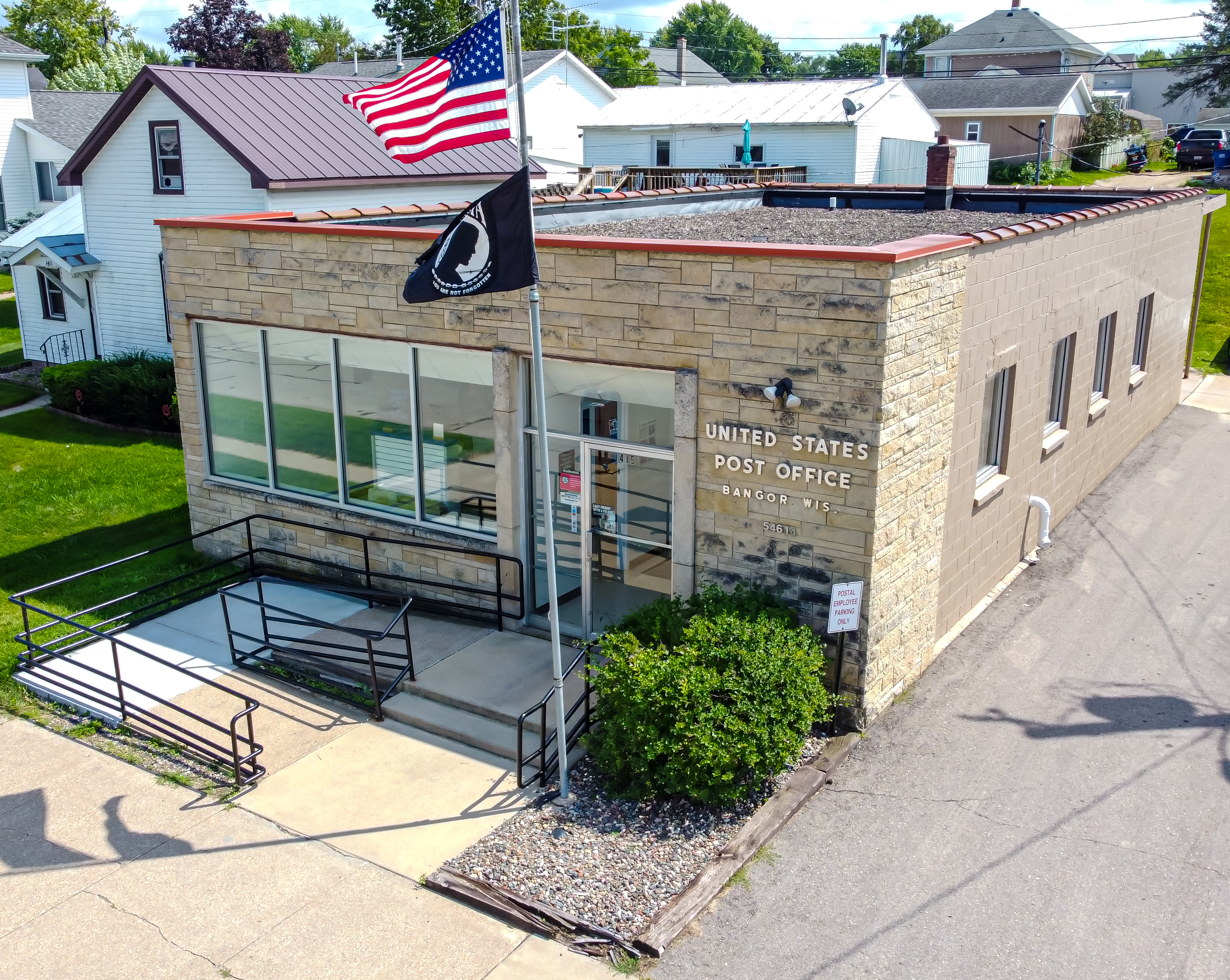
Bangor Post Office

== See also ==
- Rockland, Wisconsin
