= Wilda Logan =

American archivist

Wilda D. Logan is an American archivist who is most well-known as her work of almost 40 years in the archival profession including 33 years of federal service with the Records Management Training Program of the National Archives and Records Administration (NARA). She is a member of the Society of American Archivists (SAA), Mid-Atlantic Regional Archives Conference (MARAC), National Association of Government Archives and Records Administrators (NAGARA), and is a Certified Archivist with the Academy of Certified Archivists (ACA), where she served as a Regent from 1991–1994.

== Education ==
As an undergraduate student at Hampton Institute (now University), Logan originally dreamt of becoming a librarian. She majored in history and planned to continue after graduation with a master's in library science. In an interview with Steven D. Booth, an archivist at the Barack Obama Presidential Library, she describes her first experience with archives:

"At Hampton, history majors were required to write a senior thesis using primary sources. So we were granted special permission to do research at the Hampton Archives. Now you couldn’t just walk in. You had to have an appointment. When I went to meet with the archivist, his name was Mr. [Fritz] Malval, he showed me all types of records about Hampton, some of which dated back to the founding of the college. From the very beginning Hampton realized the significance of its role as an institution of higher learning for African Americans and they documented everything. There were official minutes, letters, news clippings, photographs…everything was so well organized. It was like I walked into heaven! After I completed my senior thesis and graduated from Hampton, I decided to still get my library science degree but to focus on archives; that it would be my career."

After she graduated from Hampton, Logan received a full scholarship to the University of Maryland at College Park to pursue her Master's in Library Science. While there, she was "one of two African American full-time graduate students." In her last semester, there were internship opportunities all across Washington, DC, including the Smithsonian and the Library of Congress, but Logan could not find any internships with African American collections. Her advisor spoke with colleagues at Howard University and created an internship with Dr. Thomas Battle at the Moorland–Spingarn Research Center at Howard University. She interned at Moorland while doing another graduate-level internship at the National Archives, and when she received her degree, she was offered the position of Manuscripts Librarian at Moorland.

== Career ==
As a Manuscripts Librarian at Moorland-Spingarn, she was responsible for processing some of the major African American manuscripts and personal papers, including those of Dr. Charles Drew and Jesse E. Moorland. In 1985, after working seven years at Howard University, she advanced to the position of Appraisal Archivist at the National Archives and then became Work Group Leader and Supervisor. As Supervisor, she was responsible for the Agriculture, Health and Human Services, ‘Education, Transportation, and Veteran Affairs Departments. She continued to manage records management training program operations in Washington, DC and manage the division's annual RACO conference and ARMA conference Federal Day programs. While still attending to her management and supervision responsibilities, Logan was also assigned to diversity and inclusion teams. In one of her teams, they were "responsible for budgets, activity reports, establishing Hispanic Association of College and Universities (HACU) internships, dissemination of NARA employment opportunities, especially for students; sharing NARA free publications and attending regional and professional career and job fairs to promote NARA." Because of their activities in diversity and inclusion, Logan and the team were awarded the Archivist Achievement Award in both 2001 and 2002.

Logan has assisted in the development of several important policies and documents through NARA "including appraisal justification memos; records management training materials; conference programs, newsletters, and publications; records management briefing documents; records management and diversity policies and procedures; and evaluation reports."

In 2023, Logan was awarded the Distinguished Terrapin Award for graduate school alumni by the University of Maryland College of Information Studies.

== Affiliations ==
=== Society of American Archivists ===
Logan became a member of the Society of American Archivists (SAA) in 1978 and served on several committees including serving on the SAA Council from 1998–2001 and her appointment as a Fellow of the SAA in 2006. Through the SAA, she is also a member of Program Committee, Membership Committee, Nominating Committee, Status of Women Committee, Committee on Institutional Evaluation and Development, Colonial Dames Scholarship Committee, Diversity Committee, Committee on Professional Education and Development, Appointments Committee, ARL/SAA Mosaic Program Selection Committee from 2013–2016, and the SAA Foundation Board of Directors in 2016, approved by a unanimous vote of the SAA Council. She helped found the African-American and Third World Archivist Roundtable, now Archivists & Archives of Color Roundtable, where she served as co-chair in 1998.

=== Archivists and Archives of Color Roundtable ===
There were many issues at SAA regarding diversity, or lack thereof. Historically, there had not been much minority participation in SAA so "people were talking about us and making decisions for us as if we didn't exist." Logan, with others, helped create the Minorities Roundtable in 1987 (now the Archivists and Archives of Color), and some began to speak out against some of the SAA's actions and began publishing a newsletter. After objections from the SAA on financing a newsletter, Dr. Thomas Battle proposed that Howard University would cover the costs and the staff would publish and distribute the newsletter for free. The newsletters were available to anyone interested in the topics of archives, manuscripts and collections of people of color. Within a year, they returned to SAA with numbers proving their popularity among not just African Americans. The newsletter was later used as a model for future Roundtables, although it continued to be funded through Howard University and Dr. Thomas Battle. "It was important for us to break down those barriers and I like to think that we did that." Through the Minorities Round Table, Logan also helped to establish the Harold T. Pinkett Minority Student Award.

In 2018, Wilda announced her retirement from the National Archives and Records Administration. The Council Resolution Honoring Wilda Logan on August 17, 2018 concludes thus:

"Wilda is an agent of change who has had a strong and guiding influence on the profession and on archivists around the country through her efforts in recruiting, mentoring, and preparing countless archivists for involvement in the profession and in SAA, especially archivists of color and NARA employees; NOW, THEREFORE, BE IT RESOLVED that the Council of the Society of American Archivists recognizes and thanks Wilda Logan for her knowledge, expertise, passion, straightforward honesty, and outstanding service to SAA, the SAA Foundation, and the archives profession."
