= Roland C. McConnell =

Archivist, historian and author (1910–2007)

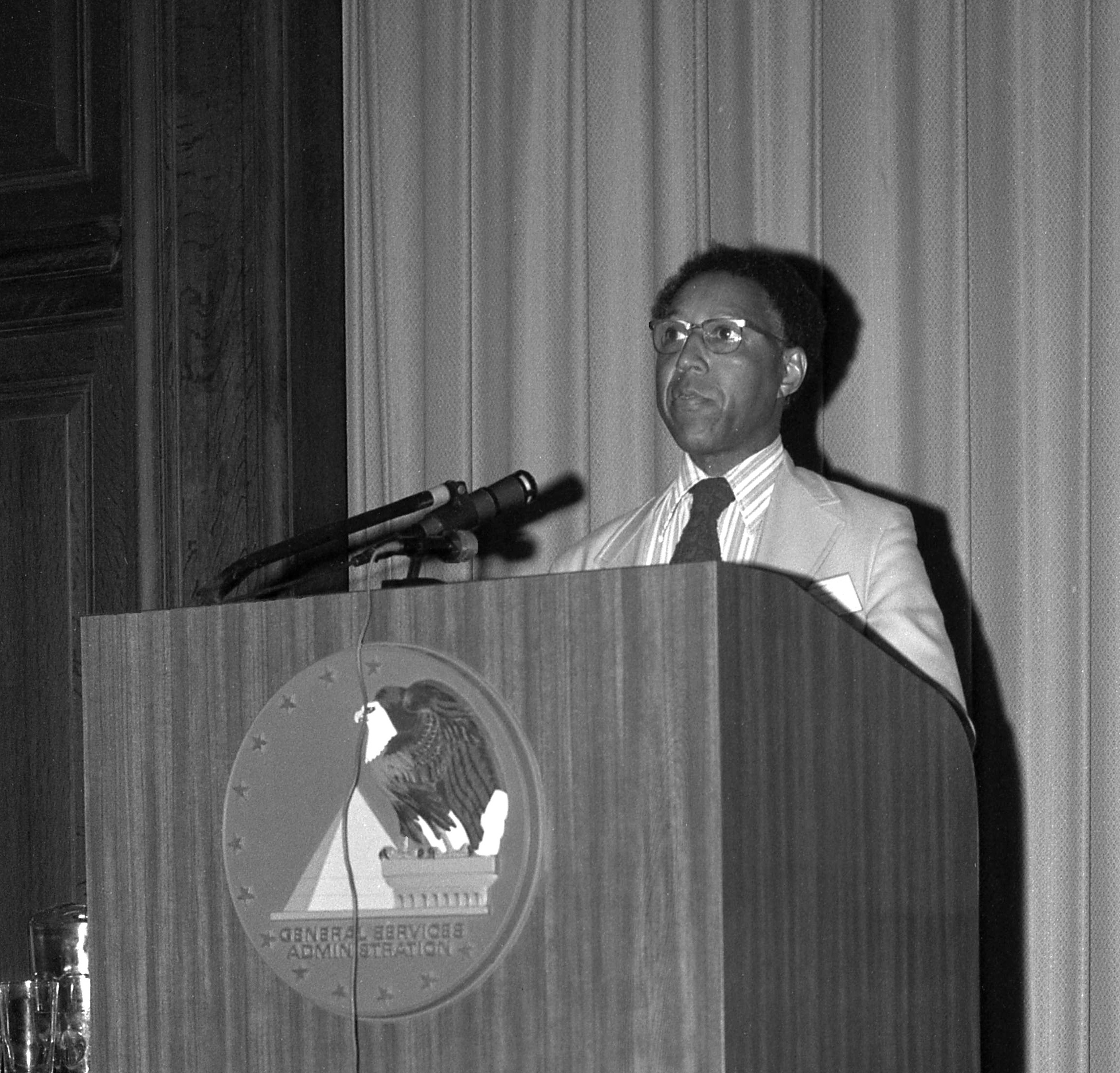
McConnell speaking at the Conference on Federal Archives as Sources for Afro-American Research in 1973

Roland C. McConnell (1910–2007) was a Canadian-born American archivist, historian and author.

== Early life and education ==
=== Family ===
McConnell was born on March 10, 1910, in Amherst, Nova Scotia, Canada. He was born to A.M.E. Reverend Thomas Benjamin McConnell of Kingstree, South Carolina and Helen Viola Halfkenny McConnell, who had met in Canada. In 1983, McConnell married Catherine A. Taylor, a school librarian and educator, with whom he co-authored articles for the Association for the Study of Afro-American Life and the Afro-American Historical and Genealogical Society. They also co-wrote "A History of Trinity Presbyterian Church Through the Years 1959 to 1989."

=== Education ===
McConnell attended Riverside School in Elkin, West Virginia, Garnet-Patterson Middle School in Washington, and graduated from Dunbar High School in 1927. At Dunbar, he was classmates with historian Sadie I. Daniels and Dr. Robert C. Weaver.

In 1931, McConnell earned his Bachelor of Arts degree from Howard University, where he also achieved his master's degree in 1933. Here, Charles Wesley introduced him to the founder of the Association for the Study of Negro Life and History (ASALH), Carter G. Woodson.

In 1945, McConnell returned to his studies and received his Ph.D. from New York University under the instruction of Dr. Ralph Betts Flanders. He majored in history with a minor in sociology.

He was married twice, first to Isabel McConnell and then to Catherine Taylor McConnell, who both died before him. McConnell died on May 2, 2007. He had no children.

== Career ==
After graduating from Howard, McConnell spent a few years teaching at Elizabeth State Teachers College but was interrupted by World War II. He joined the United States Army in 1942 and served as a statistical clerk, CFA-4, Second Lieutenant and researcher in the Industrial College of the Armed Forces.

In 1943, McConnell began lecturing at Howard University and served as an archivist at the National Archives. At the National Archives, McConnell promoted the importance of using primary sources especially amongst students of history in understanding African American History. He encouraged historians and students to learn preservation of source material as well as conduct oral histories to add to the narrative of African American History.

In 1948, began his long career at Morgan State University. While a teacher at Morgan, he taught alongside Dr. Benjamin Quarles and wrote several articles for journals and publications. He also compiled the preliminary inventories of the Emmett J. Scott Collection and the Office of the Paymaster General records. Both these inventories were published in 1959 and 1948, respectively.

From 1953 to 1955, he served as chairman of the Division of Social Science and History Department chairman from 1967 to 1975.

Throughout his educational and professional careers, McConnell aspired to document and research the history of American Americans and slavery. By the 1930s, he understood the documentation of African American history to be a must for all historians.

=== Affiliations ===
From 1972 to 1984, McConnell served as chair of the Maryland Commission on Afro-American History and Culture.

=== Publications ===
McConnell's most well-known work is his book, Negro Troops of Antebellum Louisiana: A History of the Battalion of Men of Color, published in 1969. He also contributed heavily to journals and newspapers with articles and reviews. Some of the more notable publications appear in The Journal of Negro History, The North Carolina Historical Review, The Maryland Pendulum, and the Afro-American and Baltimore Sun newspapers.

He and his wife, Catherine Taylor McConnell, served as the guest editors of the Journal of the Afro-American Genealogical Society for the spring and summer edition of 1991.

- The History of Morgan Park: A Baltimore Neighborhood, 1917-1999 (2000)
- Frederick Douglass and the Women's Rights Movement (with Benjamin Quarles, 1993)
- A History of Trinity Presbyterian Church (USA), Through the Years 1959–1989, Baltimore, Maryland (1989)
- Three Hundred and Fifty Years: A Chronology of the Afro-American in Maryland, 1634-1984 (1985)
- Negro Troops of Antebellum Louisiana: A History of the Battalion of Free Men of Color (1968)
- The Negro in North Carolina Since Reconstruction (1944)

In many of McConnell's writings, he explains the necessity and importance of oral history, especially in the history of American slavery and African Americans. Beginning in 1937, he worked to record the narratives of ex-slaves and the children of slaves with the intention of later publishing his interviews to "document familial reminiscences of enslavement, as well as demonstrate the power of storytelling and document creation, which were possible in the field of African American history."

=== Awards ===
- Meritorious Plaque from the State of Maryland and Morgan State University
- ASALH’s Journal of Negro History presented him with a trophy
- ASALH’s Mary McLeod Bethune Service Award
- Morgan State University's Dr. Roland C. McConnell Endowed Scholarship in History, named after him.
- Named Morgan State University Professor Emeritus and the Carter G. Woodson Scholar in Residence, 1981
