= Julia Marks Young =

Julia Marks Young is an archivist. She is most well known for her book Archival Appraisals with Frank Boles, which "seeks to increase the understanding of how archivists select records by developing a better understanding of the methodology underlies this selection process." She is an expert on disaster preparedness and recovery, as well as coordinating stewardship and the use of cultural patrimony.

== Education ==
In 1972, she graduated from Emory University with a BA in History. She graduated from Auburn University in 1978 with an MA in History. She earned her MLS from the University of Michigan in 1981.

== Career ==
From 1983-1990, Young served at the University of Southern Mississippi in the School of Library Science and senior manuscripts processor at the McCain Library and Archives. While there, she contributed greatly to the development of the MDAH archives as well as other archives.

Young has served as assistant archivist at the University of Michigan, head of special collections for the Superconducting Super Collider Laboratory in Dallas, head of special collections and archives at the Pullen Library at Georgia State University, and Director of development and external affairs at the Libraries and Information Technology Division of Emory University.

From 2005 to 2016, Young served as Director of the Archives and Records Services Division at the Mississippi Department of Archives and History. She said, “There was really a desire to create a space where Mississippians can come together, examine their history and move forward as one."

=== Affiliations ===
- She has been a member of the Society of American Archivists and served in many roles, including chair of the Acquisition and Appraisal Section, conference presenter, workshop instructor, and editor of their journal The American Archivist.
- She has served in many roles, including President, with the Council of State Archivists.
- She has spoken at many conferences and events over her career, including as the keynote speaker at the International Council of Archives.

=== Awards ===
In 2015, Young received the Victoria Irons Walch Leadership Award from the Council of State Archivists, presented by Wayne Metcalfe from FamilySearch.

In 2011, Young was named a Fellow of the Society of American Archivists, the society's highest honor.

=== Publications ===
- Archival Appraisals with Frank Boles, 1991
- Mississippi's Historical Heritage: a Directory of Libraries, Archives, and Organizations with Sandra E. Boyd, 1990
- "Exploring the Black Box: The Appraisal of University Administrative Records" with Frank Boles, American Archivist 1985
  - This "game-changing article" defined what would become microappraisal and acknowledged the role of politics and resources in appraisal decisions, which were "daring arguments in their day." It also insisted that selection was an intellectual process and not based on intuition.
