= Christian Anderson (musician) =

American musician

Trust'N
- Born: Christian Anderson; June 15, 1998 (age 28)
- Education: University of Wisconsin–La Crosse
- Occupations: Musician; President of Lost Boy Entertainment
- Years active: 2018-present
- Musical career
- Genre: Hip-hop
- Instruments: Vocals
- Labels: Create Music Group; Lost Boy Records

Christian Anderson, known professionally as Trust'N, is an American musician, former record executive, and businessman. He is a voting member of the Grammy Recording Academy.

== Early life and education ==
Anderson grew up in Middleton, Wisconsin. During childhood he studied piano and later played trumpet. At 16, he began rapping and freestyling with friends, which led to recording his first songs and sharing them online when he was 17. By his late teens, he had begun releasing music on SoundCloud under the stage name Trust'N.

Anderson graduated from Middleton High School in 2017. He later attended University of Wisconsin–La Crosse, where he studied marketing. While enrolled, he continued working on music and began promoting his releases independently. Anderson later left the university but completed his marketing degree online in 2023.

== Career ==
In 2019, Anderson was an executive at Bentley Records. That same year, he co-founded Lost Boy Entertainment with Bryce Vander Sanden, due to "issues" with his music distributor.

During college, his EP Lapse reached the top 20 of the iTunes hip-hop charts. He also was a member of the Forbes Communication Council based on his work in communications and PR.

In 2022, Anderson and Bkwds released the five-track EP Neverland. The project was developed over roughly two years, as a reflection on the COVID-19 pandemic. The EP included the single "Stay (Go)" which later charted at number 17 on Billboard Luxembourg Songs.

In addition to his work in music and entertainment, Anderson has written for Entrepreneur, and has been a contributor for Rolling Stone in relation to his work in the music industry.

== Discography ==
=== Extended plays ===
- Lapse (2019)
- Neverland (2022)

=== Singles ===
- "Do What I Gotta" (2018)
- "Let You Be" (2019)
- "West Virginia" (2019)
- "Eighteen" (2020)
- "OverYou" (2024)
- "Stay (Go)" (2025)
