= Richard Severson =

United States Air Force general

- Alma mater: University of Wisconsin–La Crosse
- Military career
- Allegiance: United States
- Branch: United States Air Force
- Service years: 1972-2018
- Rank: Brigadier General
- Commands: 440th Tactical Airlift Squadron; 95th Tactical Airlift Squadron; 920th Rescue Group; 459th Airlift Wing/459th Air Refueling Wing
- Conflicts: Gulf War

Richard Severson was a brigadier general in the United States Air Force.

== Biography ==
Severson is a native of Brooklyn, Wisconsin. He graduated from the University of Wisconsin–La Crosse with a B.D. in education.

== Career ==
Severson was commissioned an officer in 1972. He was first assigned to the 440th Tactical Airlift Squadron stationed at General Mitchell International Airport. During the Gulf War he served with the 95th Tactical Airlift Squadron. In 1996, he was given command of the 920th Rescue Group. During the war on terror he took command of the 459th Airlift Wing/459th Air Refueling Wing. In 2005, he was named Vice Commander of the Air Force Reserve Command. His retirement was effective as of August 18, 2008.

Awards he has received include the Legion of Merit, the Meritorious Service Medal with three oak leaf clusters, the Aerial Achievement Medal, the Air Force Commendation Medal, the Combat Readiness Medal with three oak leaf clusters, the National Defense Service Medal, the Southwest Asia Service Medal with two service stars, the Global War on Terrorism Service Medal, the Armed Forces Reserve Medal with silver hourglass device, the Vietnam Gallantry Cross, and the Kuwait Liberation Medal.
