= Leland E. Mulder =

American politician

Leland E. Mulder (1925-1993) was a member of the Wisconsin State Assembly.

== Biography ==
Mulder was born on June 9, 1925, in La Crosse, Wisconsin. He attended the University of Wisconsin–Madison and University of Wisconsin–La Crosse. He died on January 1, 1993.

== Career ==
Mulder was elected to the Assembly in 1958. Previously, he unsuccessfully ran for a seat in the Assembly in 1956. In 1986, he ran for the United States House of Representatives from Wisconsin's 3rd congressional district, losing to incumbent Steve Gunderson. He was a Democrat.
