= Mabel Deutrich =

American archivist (1915–1998)

Mabel E. Deutrich
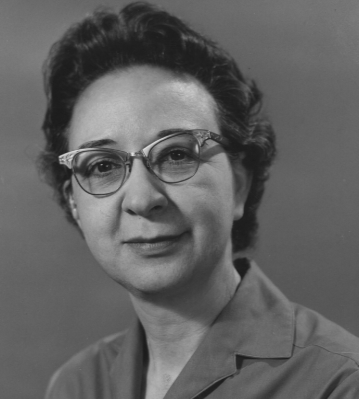
- A photo of Deutrich in 1960
- Born: April 15, 1915; Burns, Wisconsin
- Died: June 4, 1998 (aged 83); Santa Cruz, California
- Education: La Crosse State Teachers College, American University
- Occupation: Archivist

Mabel Evelyn Deutrich (April 15, 1915 – June 4, 1998) was an American archivist. In 1975 she was the highest ranking woman in the history of the National Archives.

She had a 29-year career as a government archivist and served as Assistant Archivist for the Office of the National Archive (predecessor of the National Archives and Records Administration) from 1975 to 1979. She was a specialist on the American Revolutionary War, who inventoried War Department collections of Revolutionary War records. She was particularly active in assessing the role and status of men and women archivists. She received the 1976 NARS Meritorious Service Award for “advancing the status of women in the archival profession." After her retirement, she wrote a history of American women, Clio was a Woman: Studies in the History of American Women, focusing on the National Archives collections about women.

== Biography ==
Mabel E. Deutrich was born in Burns, Wisconsin and graduated from La Crosse State Teachers College (now known as the University of Wisconsin at La Crosse) with an associate degree in rural education in 1934. She returned to La Crosse State Teachers College and completed a B.S. degree in 1942.

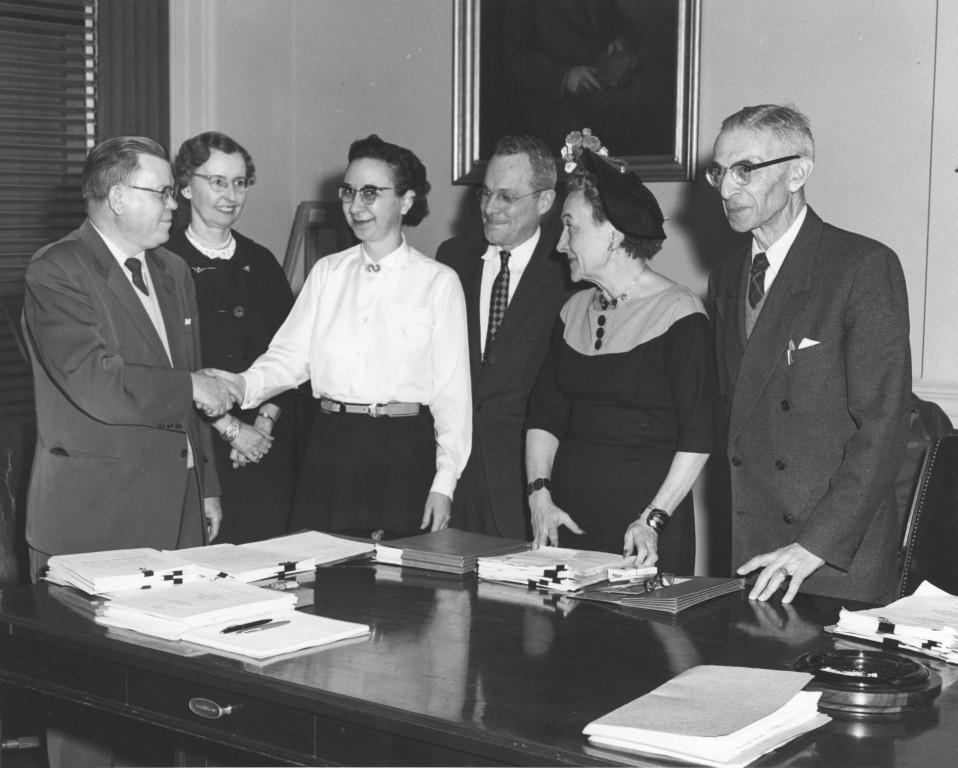
Deutrich during her PhD studies

She became a clerk in the Mail and Record Division in the Office of the Chief Engineers during World War II. She served as a historian in the Department of the Army from 1947 to 1950. In 1950, she joined the National Archives in Washington, D.C. She received an M.A. in public administration from American University in 1958, followed by a Ph.D. in public administration in 1960. The subject of her thesis was Fred C. Ainsworth: Army Surgeon and Administrator, work that was the basis of her 1962 book Struggle for Supremacy: The Career of General Fred C. Ainsworth. She served as Assistant Archivist for the Office of the National Archive (predecessor of the National Archives and Records Administration) from 1975 to 1979. She retired from NARA in 1979.

After Deutrich's retirement, she wrote a history of American women, Clio was a Woman: Studies in the History of American Women, focusing on the National Archives collections about women.

== Professional surveys ==
Deutrich carried out a study of individual training and the rewards received by men and women archivists, entitled "Women in Archives: Ms. versus Mr. Archivist" in 1973. She headed the Committee on the Status of Women in preparing The Report on the Status of Women in the Archival Profession (1974), which compared the "rank, salary and professional commitment" of men and women in the archival profession. Responsibility for enforcing the Equal Pay Act and the Age Discrimination in Employment Act were transferred from the Labor Department to the Equal Employment Opportunity Commission (EEOC) in 1979. Deutrich carried out a major review of the archival profession in 1979, published in 1980 as "The Society of American Archivists: Survey of the Archival Profession—1979".

== Published works ==
- Deutrich, Mabel E. (1962). Struggle for Supremacy: The Career of General Fred C. Ainsworth. Washington, D.C.: Public Affairs Press.
- Deutrich, Mabel E.; Purdy, Virginia Cardwell (1980). Clio was a Woman: Studies in the History of American Women. Washington: Howard University Press. ISBN 9780882582375.

== Death ==
Mabel E. Deutrich died of cancer in Santa Cruz, California on June 4, 1998.
