= List of film archives =

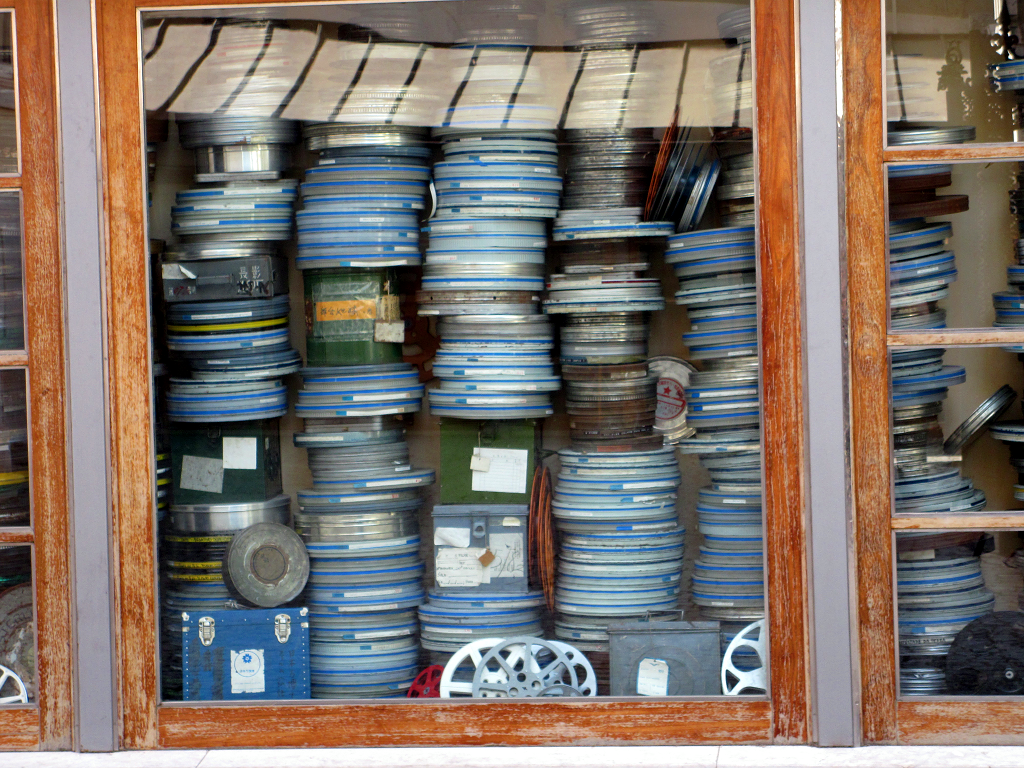
Film reels in the Cinemateca Portuguesa.

This is a list of film archives and cinematheques. Film archives collect, restore, investigate and conserve audiovisual content like films, documentaries, television programs and newsreel footage. Often, a country has its own film archive to preserve the national audiovisual heritage. The International Federation of Film Archives comprises more than 150 institutions in over 77 countries and the Association of European Film Archives and Cinematheques is an affiliation of 49 European national and regional film archives founded in 1991.

== International ==
The European Film Gateway is a single access point to European film archives and cinematheques.

== Albania ==
- Albanian Central Film Archive

== Angola ==
- Cinemateca Nacional de Angola

== Argentina ==
- Museo del Cine Pablo Ducros Hicken

== Armenia ==
- Armenian National Cinematheque

== Austria ==
- Austrian Film Museum

== Australia ==
- National Film and Sound Archive

== Bangladesh ==
- Bangladesh Film Archive

== Belgium ==
- CINEMATEK

== Bosnia ==
- Filmski Centar Sarajevo

== Brazil ==
- Arquivo Nacional
- Cinemateca Brasileira
- Cinemateca do Museu de Arte Moderna

== Bulgaria ==
- Bulgarian National Film Archive

== Burkina Faso ==
- African Film Library / FESPACO

== Canada ==
- Cinémathèque québécoise
- Provincial Archives of Alberta
- TIFF Lightbox - Film Reference Library
- West Coast Film Archive, Pacific Cinémathèque
- Library and Archives Canada

== China ==
- China Film Archive

== Croatia ==
- Hrvatska kinoteka
- INDOK

== Czech Republic ==
- Národní filmový archiv

== Denmark ==
- Det Danske Filminstitut

== Estonia ==
- Estonian Film Archives

== France ==
- National Center of Cinematography and the moving image - CNC Archives Français du Film
- Institut national de l'audiovisuel
- Cinémathèque Française
- Cinémathèque de Bretagne

== Finland ==
- National Audiovisual Institute

== Germany ==
- Bundesarchiv Filmarchiv
- Deutsches Filminstitut
- Deutsche Kinemathek - Museum für Film und Fernsehen
- Friedrich-Wilhelm-Murnau-Stiftung
- Zentrum für Kunst und Medientechnologie, Karlsruhe

== Hungary ==
- Hungarian National Film Archive
- Nemzeti Audiovizuális Archívum (NAVA) (Hungarian National Broadcasting Archive)
- Blinken Open Society Archives

== India ==
- National Film Archive of India
- Film Heritage Foundation
- Films Division of India

== Iran ==
- Islamic Republic of Iran Broadcasting Archive

== Ireland ==
- Irish Film Archive
- Radharc Archive

== Israel ==
- Israel Film Archive Jerusalem Cinematheque
- Steven Spielberg Jewish Film Archive
- Yad Vashem Archives

== Italy ==
- Cineteca di Bologna
- Archivio Audiovisivo del Movimento Operaio e Democratico
- ASCinema - Archivio Siciliano del Cinema
- Film archive in Torino Museo Nazionale Del Cinema
- National Film Archive - Cineteca Nazionale - Centro Sperimentale Di Cinematografia

== Japan ==
- National Film Archive of Japan
- Fukuoka City Public Library
- Kobe Planet Film Archive

== Laos ==
- National Library of Laos

== Lebanon ==
- Cinematheque du Liban

== Malawi ==
- National Archives of Malawi

== Mexico ==
- Centro de Capacitación Cinematográfica
- Cineteca Nacional de México
- Filmoteca UNAM
- Agrasánchez Film Archive
- Agrasánchez Film Library

== Mongolia ==
- National Archives of Mongolia

== Netherlands ==
- EYE Film Institute Netherlands

== New Zealand ==
- Ngā Taonga Sound & Vision

== Nigeria ==
- Archive of Sound and Vision, Ibadan
- National Film, Video and Sound Archive, Jos
- University of Nigeria, Nsukka

== North Macedonia ==
- Cinematheque of Macedonia

== Norway ==
- Norsk Filmstitutt
- Norwegian Film Institute

== Philippines ==
- ABS-CBN Film Archives
- CCP Library and Archives
- Philippine Film Archive

== Poland ==
- Filmoteka Śląska (Silesian Film Archive)
- Filmoteka Narodowa-Instytut Audiowizualny

== Portugal ==
- Cinemateca Portuguesa

== Romania ==
- Arhiva Națională de Filme

== Russia ==
- Russian State Film and Photo Archive
- Gosfilmofond of Russia
- State Television and Radio Fund

== Serbia ==
- State Audiovisual Archives of Serbia – Yugoslav Film Archives

== Singapore ==
- Asian Film Archive
- National Archives of Singapore

== Slovenia ==
- Archives of the Republic of Slovenia

== South Africa ==
- National Archives of South Africa
- University of Cape Town: Centre for Popular Memory
- University of the Witwatersrand Archive

== South Korea ==
- Korean Film Archive

== Spain ==
- Filmoteca Española

== Sweden ==
- Swedish Film Institute Archive

== Taiwan ==
- Taiwan Film and Audiovisual Institute

== Tunisia ==
- Cinémathèque tunisienne

== Ukraine ==
- Central State Audiovisual and Electronic Archive
- Oleksandr Dovzhenko National Centre

== United Kingdom ==
- BBC Archives
- Beaulieu National Motor Museum
- British Library
- Imperial War Museum
- Huntley Film Archives
- East Anglian Film Archive
- Cinenova Feminist Film Archive
- June Givanni Pan African Cinema Archive
- BFI National Archive
- ITV Archive
- Lincolnshire Film Archive
- London's Screen Archive
- London Television Archive
- Media Archive for Central England
- National Screen and Sound Archive of Wales
- National Video Archive of Performance
- Northern Ireland Screen
- North West Film Archive
- Northern Region Film and Television Archive
- Screen Archive South East
- South West Film and Television Archive
- Scottish Screen
- The National Archives
- Stanley Kubrick Archive
- Wessex Film and Sound Archive
- Yorkshire Film Archive

== United States ==
- Academy Film Archive
- Alaska Film Archives
- American Film Archive
- Anthology Film Archives
- American Film Institute - AFI Archive
- American Genre Film Archive
- Berkeley Art Museum and Pacific Film Archive
- Black Film Center/Archive, Indiana University Bloomington
- BYU Motion Picture Archive, L. Tom Perry Special Collections Library
- Chicago Film Archives
- CineFiles
- DEFA Film Library
- Fortunoff Video Archive for Holocaust Testimonies
- Gene Siskel Film Center
- George Eastman Museum
- Harvard Film Archive
- Historic Films Archive
- Human Studies Film Archives
- Indiana University Libraries Moving Image Archive
- Japanese American National Museum
- Library of Congress - Motion Picture, Broadcasting and Sound Division
- Museum of Modern Art Department of Film
- National Film Preservation Foundation
- National Film Registry
- National Air and Space Museum Film Archive
- National Archives and Records Administration - Motion Pictures
- National Center for Jewish Film
- National Library of Medicine - History of Medicine Collections: Films & Videos
- New York University Libraries, Barbara Goldsmith Preservation & Conservation Department
- Northeast Historic Film
- Northwest Film Center
- Prelinger Archives
- Research Video (Warner-Pathe, Paramount Newsreels)
- San Francisco Bay Area Television Archive
- Texas Archive of the Moving Image
- UCLA Film and Television Archive
- United States Holocaust Memorial Museum - Film and Video Archive
- Vanderbilt Television News Archive
- Wisconsin Center for Film and Theater Research
- WWE Video Library
- Yale Film Archive

== Venezuela ==
- Cinemateca Nacional de Venezuela
- Cine Archivo Bolívar Films
- Archivo Departamento de Cine de la Universidad de los Andes

== See also ==
- Archive
- List of archives
- International Federation of Film Archives
- List of sound archives

== Bibliography ==
- Le Roy, Éric. Cinémathèques et archives du film.
- Morgan, Jenny. The Film Researcher's Handbook: A Guide to Sources in North America, Asia, Australasia and Africa.
