= Unlocking Film Heritage =

Unlocking Film Heritage (UFH) was one of the biggest film digitisation projects ever undertaken and it encompassed the BFI National Archive together with national and regional audiovisual archival institutions in United Kingdom. Between 2013–2017 around 10,000 titles, capturing 120 years of Great Britain on film, were digitised and made free-to-access in a variety of ways. Many archival clips can be watched for free online via BFI Player.

== Unlocking Film Heritage (UFH) ==
British Film Institute (BFI) feared that the UK’s audiovisual heritage was in danger of being stranded in the analogue domain and forever inaccessible to the people of Britain. So they made a five year plan – Film Forever: Supporting UK Film 2012–2017 in order to remedy this. BFI consulted and collaborated with commercial facilities, national and regional archives as well as commercial rights holders to establish, harmonise and document technical standards and requirements for preservation and access. Aided by National Lottery funding, the Unlocking Film Heritage Digitisation Fund was launched in 2013. The goal of the programme was to ensure that researchers, film-makers, outreach programmes and the general public easier can access the British intangible cultural heritage. In order to achieve this investments were done in preservation, digitisation and interpretation of audiovisual archival material. The content of the material spans from urban architecture to rural landscapes, from festivals to schools, from local people to famous visitors etc. Around 10,000 titles were digitised and have been documented within the BFI collections information database and the majority are free-to-watch as part of Britain on Film and other themed collections on BFI Player, a webpage developed for within the project. Public access was extended further through social media, theatrical, broadcast and home entertainment releases on Blu-ray and DVD.

The UFH project was one of the largest and most complex archive preservation projects undertaken in the UK and it won the award for Best Archive Preservation Project at the FIAT/IFTA (International Federation of Television Archives) world conference in Warsaw 2016. A jury of international experts was impressed by the highly collaborative nature of the UFH project, where expertise and commercial service providers from all of UK nations and regions participated. The jury also praised the new technologies and processes invented and used, where the aim was not only to care for the archival collections but also to make them accessible to a digitally connected world.

== Participants in the UFH project ==
The following organisations participated in the project;

=== East Anglian Film Archive (EAFA) ===
This regional film archive was one of the first in UK, established in the 1970s as a repository for the regions audiovisual heritage. More than 150 hours of archive film footage from EAFA was made available during the UFH project. The content depicts Norfolk life and includes scenes from Cromer and Caister in the 1930s, a visit by George Formby to the region in 1949, actress Joyce Grenfell in King’s Lynn in 1961, the K Shoe factory workers protest of 1976 and the Singing Postman.

=== National Screen and Sound Archive of Wales (NSSAW) ===
NSSAW (part of National Library of Wales) holds a film collection of over 5 million feet of film that represents Welsh culture and life in Wales from the late 19th Century through to the 21st Century. Over 700 titles were made available free online during the UFH project. There are newsreels, advertisements, commercial and amateur films including: a phantom train ride through Conwy railway station (1898), an athletics and horse racing event at the Cardiff Stadium (1911), the Marquis of Anglesey's children playing with their nannies (1922), David Lloyd George with his pet dogs (c. 1929), Men Against Death (1933), a restoration of the first Welsh language feature film: Y Chwarelwr (The Quarryman) (1935), agricultural shows around Wales from the 1940s, majorettes at various carnivals in the Dulais Valley from the 1950s to 1970s, Tiger Bay and the Rainbow Club (1960), Tryweryn – The Story of a Valley (1969) and an Oscar winning documentary on Dylan Thomas (1962).

=== Northern Ireland Screen (NIS) ===
Northern Ireland Screen worked together a host of organisations including National Museums Northern Ireland, UTV, Tourism NI and the Irish Film Archive. About 200 pieces of cine film was digitised and preserved through the project.

=== Screen Archive South East (SASE) ===
SASE contributed about 400 films and material is a mixture of publicity films, amateur films, local news films, films originally designed as public records, industrial films, advertisements, short fiction and animation.

=== Wessex Film and Sound Archive (WFSA) ===
WFSA contributed with about 80 films and the material is a mixture of publicity films, amateur films, local news films, films originally designed as public records, industrial films, advertisements, short fiction and animation.

=== Yorkshire Film Archive (YFA) / North East Film Archive (NEFA) ===
In 2012 NEFA merged with the Yorkshire Film Archive.

== See also other similar projects ==
- Unlocking Our Sound Heritage Project (A UK-wide digitising project for audio archival material.)
- Endangered Archive Programme
- Theatre Archive Project
- Qatar Digital Library
