= Media Archive for Central England =

Media Archive for Central England (MACE) is the public sector regional film archive that collects, preserves and provides access to film, television and other moving image materials that relate to the governmental regions of the East Midlands and West Midlands (region).

In 1995 it was registered as a company, with a board of directors, to create the regional archive for the Midlands. MACE took on this role when James Patterson was appointed as its director in 2000. It is now an independent limited company and a registered charity (as Media Archive of Central England Ltd) based at the University of Lincoln.

As the principal moving image archive service provider in the Midlands, MACE works with a wide range of partners across the regions to help people to experience their moving image heritage.

== DVD Productions ==
=== 2010 ===
MACE released the DVD, The Black Country 1969, a compilation of films produced by Associated Television for the Midlands region in the 1960s and 1970s. The DVD's main feature is a 32-minute documentary ATV Today: 07.04.1969: The Black Country, an Easter Special narrated by Gwyn Richards, which profiled the people and places of the Black Country. It also includes the documentary, Jaywalking: On the Road to Nowhere, originally broadcast in 1974 which, according to an ATV press release at the time, won an award for Best Programme in the Sociological Film the San Francisco International TV and Film Festival that year.

=== 2011 ===
MACE released From ATVLand in Colour a 2 disc DVD documentary which tells the story of the affectionately known ‘ATVLand’ – the ATV Centre in Birmingham, from its beginnings to its ultimate closure in 1997 and beyond, celebrating the programmes that came from the studios throughout its working life. The DVD includes a mix of rare archive footage of regional news and programming preserved at the Media Archive for Central England, much of which has not been seen since broadcast, as well as interviews exclusive to this DVD with those who worked at the centre, including Jim Bowen, Barbara Bradbury, Reg Harcourt, Peter Harris, Diana Mather, Wendy Nelson, Jane Rossington, Debbie Shore, Chris Tarrant, Shaw Taylor, Gary Terzza, Bob Warman and Jo Wheeler.

Also in 2011, MACE released Nottingham on Film, a 2 disc DVD produced and edited by filmmaker Andy McKay and his team at the University of Lincoln's School of Media which pieces together rarely seen and newly restored film preserved at the Media Archive for Central England which dates from 1920 to 1980. The DVD has 10 Chapters: Disc One: The Heart of the city: Old Market Square, Celebration & Royalty, Goose Fair, War & Commemoration, Life on the Water, A City of Culture. Disc Two: Textiles & The Lace, Raleigh, Post War, Reshaping the city, Champions & Heroes. Nottingham on Film was nominated for Best Use of Footage in a Home Entertainment Release at the FOCAL International Awards 2013. Nottingham on Film is one of nine DVDs in a series, Midlands on Film.

=== 2012 ===
MACE released From Headlines to 'Tight-Lines' - The Story of ATV Today, a 2 disc DVD in four parts which chronicles the story of regional news magazine programme ATV Today from its beginning in 1964 to the last programme on 31 December 1981, and looks back at some of the big news stories in the region that made the headlines through the 1960s and 1970s through interviews and a wealth of archive films. Interviewees are former ATV reporters Bob Hall, Reg Harcourt, Sue Jay, Wendy Nelson, Gary Newbon, Nick Owen, Chris Tarrant and Bob Warman as well as former ATV Cameraman Gary Hughes and former ATV Production Assistant, Barbara Bradbury. Part 1: The 1960s, Part 2: The Early 1970's, Part 3: The Golden Era, Part 4: The Final Chapter. in 2013, From Headlines to 'Tight-Lines' won a FOCAL International Award for Best Use of Footage in a Home Entertainment Release.

MACE also released eight more DVDs in the Midlands on Film Series: Derbyshire on Film - The Peak District, Rebuilding Coventry, Nottingham on Film, Regenerating Birmingham, Shropshire Lives, Made in Leicester, Snobs & Clowns: Northamptonshire on Film 1932–1989, Footprints in the Sand: Holidays on the Lincolnshire Coast and Worcestershire on Film.

== See also ==
- BFI National Archive
- Scottish Screen
- National Screen and Sound Archive of Wales
- Imperial War Museum
- Northern Region Film and Television Archive
- British Library
- Museums, Libraries and Archives Council
- National Archives (UK)
- Film Archive Forum
- Unlocking Film Heritage
