= Film Archives UK =

Film Archives UK, formerly known as the Film Archive Forum, represents all of the public sector film and television archives which care for the UK's moving image heritage. It represents the UK's public sector moving image archives in all archival aspects of the moving image, and acts as the advisory body on national moving image archive policy.

== History ==
The Film Archive Forum (FAF) was established in 1987 with the object of fostering an informal network of British moving image archives. Full membership remains institutional, although others can be invited to attend Forum meetings as Observing Members. The Forum takes an interest in all the archival aspects of the moving image. It has particular interest in the preservation of nitrate film, acetate film, videotape and digital media; the training of archivists, acquisitions policy, standards for archives, copyright, co-operation with film laboratories, and contacts with foreign archives.

Since its inception, the FAF lobbied for greater public recognition of the work undertaken by regional film archives. In 2011, the FAF became known as Film Archives UK (FAUK).

== Members ==
Members of Film Archives UK include four national collections and eight regional film archives. The It comprises:

- BFI National Archive
- Scottish Screen Archive
- National Screen and Sound Archive of Wales
- Imperial War Museum Film and Video Archive
- East Anglian Film Archive
- Media Archive for Central England
- North West Film Archive
- Northern Region Film and Television Archive
- Screen Archive South East
- South West Film and Television Archive
- Wessex Film and Sound Archive
- Yorkshire Film Archive

== Observer members ==
The Film Archive Forum has eight observer members. They are the British Library, the British Universities Film and Video Council, the Irish Film Institute, London's Screen Archives: The Regional Network, the Museums, Libraries and Archives Council, the National Archives (UK), the National Council on Archives, and the Northern Ireland Film and Television Commission.
