= NWFA =

NWFA is an initialism which could mean:

- National Women's Football Association, an American football competition
- National Wood Flooring Association
- North West Frontier Agency, an alternative name for the province of Pakistan known as Khyber Pakhtunkhwa
- North West Film Archive, an institution in north western England
- North Western Football Association, an Australian rules football league in north western Tasmania
