= Maṭbaʻ-i Mujtabāʼī =

Publishing house in India

Maṭbaʻ-i Mujtabāʼī (Urdu: المطبع المجتبائي) was a publishing house based in Delhi and Lucknow that between the 1890s and 1930s that published works in Arabic, Urdu and Persian.

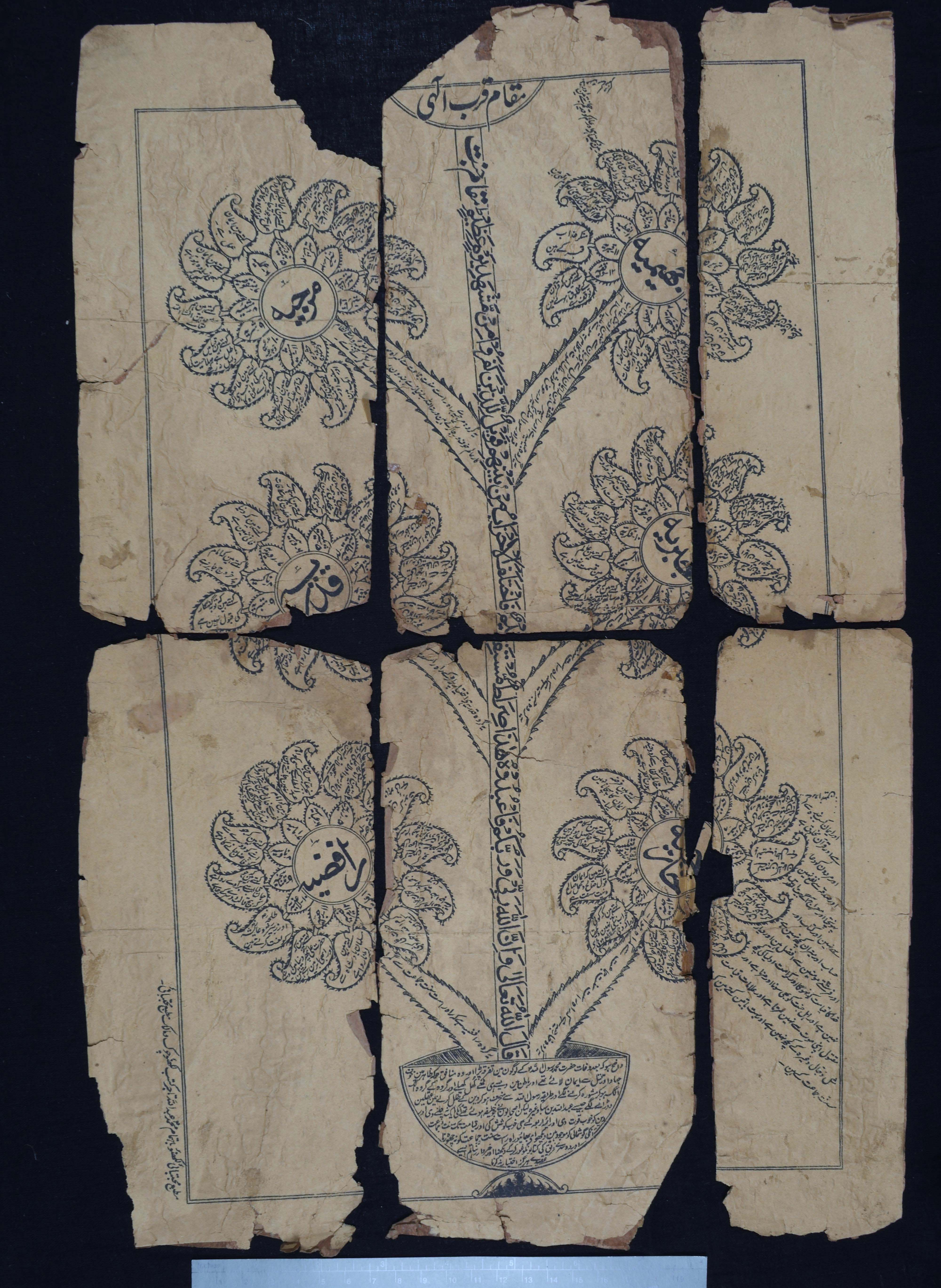
Six heretical sects in early Islam, didactic chart published by the Maṭbaʻ-i Mujtabāʼī, with the incumbent of the Dargāh of Shaykh Kamāl al-Dīn.

Notable publications include the sayings of Ḥaz̤rat Shāh ʻAbd al-Ḥaqq Aḥmad Ridaulvī who belonged to the Ṣābirī branch of the Chishti order. He was the third in this order after Ṣābir Kalerī and died in 1433-34 CE.

A number of the lithographs of the publishing house have been scanned and are available through several libraries, for example the Islamic Lithographs digital collection at McGill University Library. McGill has made some of the works available via the Internet Archive, for example the Laṭāʼif-i Quddūsī of ʻAbd al-Quddūs Gangūhī (1453-1537 CE). Another important source for the press is the online digital library of the Chughutai Public Library, Lahore.

One work from the press is also available from the Islamic Heritage Project at Harvard University.
