= Cinémathèque française =

Film archive, screening venue in Paris

- Established: 1936; 90 years ago
- Headquarters: 51, Rue de Bercy; 75012 Paris, France
- Location: Just outside the Parc de Bercy, Paris, France
- Coordinates: 48.8369°N 2.3825°E
- Key people: Henri Langlois & Georges Franju (co-founders); Isabelle Huppert (president)
- Website: cinematheque.fr

The Cinémathèque française (French pronunciation: [sinematɛk fʁɑ̃sɛːz]; French cinematheque), founded in 1936, is a French non-profit film organization that holds one of the largest archives of film documents and film-related objects in the world. Based in Paris' 12th arrondissement, the archive offers daily screenings of films from around the world. It is the second oldest cinematheque in France, after Cinematheque de Saint-Etienne, which was founded in 1922.

== History ==
The collection emerged from the efforts of Henri Langlois and Lotte H. Eisner in the mid 1930s to collect and screen films. Langlois had acquired one of the largest collections in the world by the beginning of World War II, only to have it nearly wiped out by the German authorities in occupied France, who ordered the destruction of all films made prior to 1937. He and his friends smuggled huge numbers of documents and films out of occupied France to protect them until the end of the war.

On 9 April 1938 three young Belgian intellectuals, André Thirifays, Henri Storck and Piet Vermeylen, who had been organising the film club Le Club de l'Écran (transl. The Screen Club) since 1931, decided not only to screen quality films, but also to actively contribute to the preservation of film history. Encouraged by Henri Langlois, with whom they had built up a close relationship, they founded the Belgian Film Archive.

After the war, the French government provided a small screening room, staff and subsidy for the collection, which was relocated to the Avenue de Messine. Significant French filmmakers of the 1940s, and 1950s, including Robert Bresson, René Clément, Henri-Georges Clouzot and Jacques Becker frequented screenings at the Cinémathèque. Directors of the New Wave (la Nouvelle Vague) school — Alain Resnais, Jacques Rivette, François Truffaut, Jean-Luc Godard, Claude Chabrol, Roger Vadim, Jacques Doniol-Valcroze, and Pierre Kast — also received much of their film education by attending the collection's screenings.

A meeting in 1945, in Basel between Langlois and Freddy Buache led, via Lausanne's first film club, to the founding in 1950 of the Swiss Film Archive.

In 2003, film critic Serge Toubiana became general manager of the Cinémathèque in April, a position he held until December 2015. From September 2003 to June 2007, the producer and director Claude Berri is president of the Cinémathèque, succeeding Jean-Charles Tacchella.

On February 28, 2005, the halls of the Palais de Chaillot and the Grands Boulevards were closed and the new site of the Cinémathèque française, at 51 rue de Bercy, opened to the public on September 28.

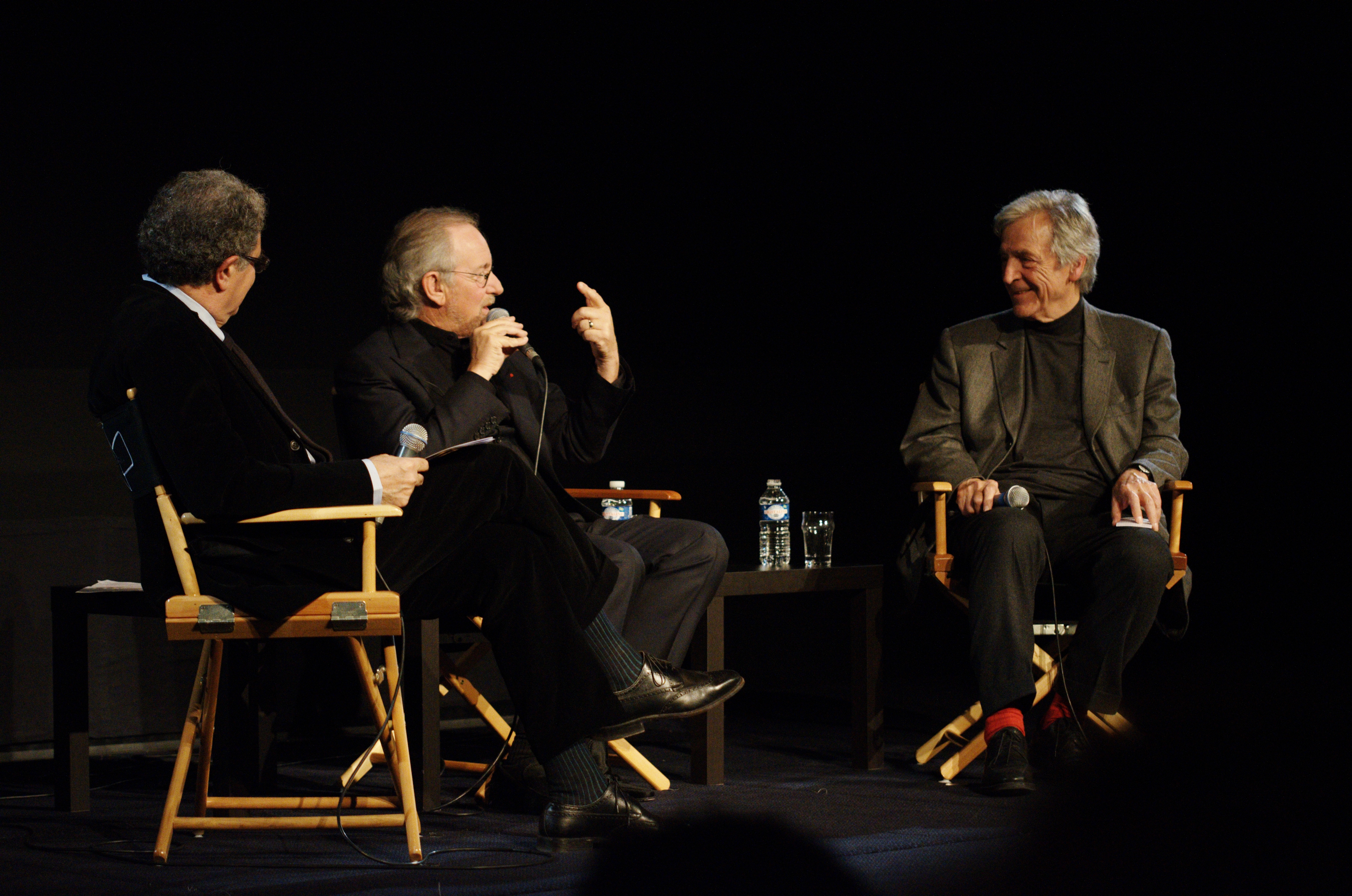
Costa-Gavras (right), then-president of the Cinémathèque, attending Steven Spielberg's (left) Masterclass [Paris - Jan. 9th, 2012].

On January 1, 2007, the Cinémathèque française merged with the BiFi. From June 2007, Claude Berri being ill, it was chaired by Costa-Gavras. In January 2016, critic Frédéric Bonnaud succeeded Serge Toubiana as general manager.

In 2026, the Cinémathèque française marked its 90th anniversary with a program titled "90 Ans de Passion," involving the restoration of 90 "lost" films from the Langlois era. This milestone coincided with the centenary of Marilyn Monroe's birth, which the institution commemorated with a major retrospective and exhibition, "Marilyn: Le Centenaire," running from April to July 2026.

== The events of May 1968 ==
In June 1963, the Cinémathèque moved to the Palais de Chaillot with funds provided by André Malraux, Minister of Culture, and became subject to government overview.

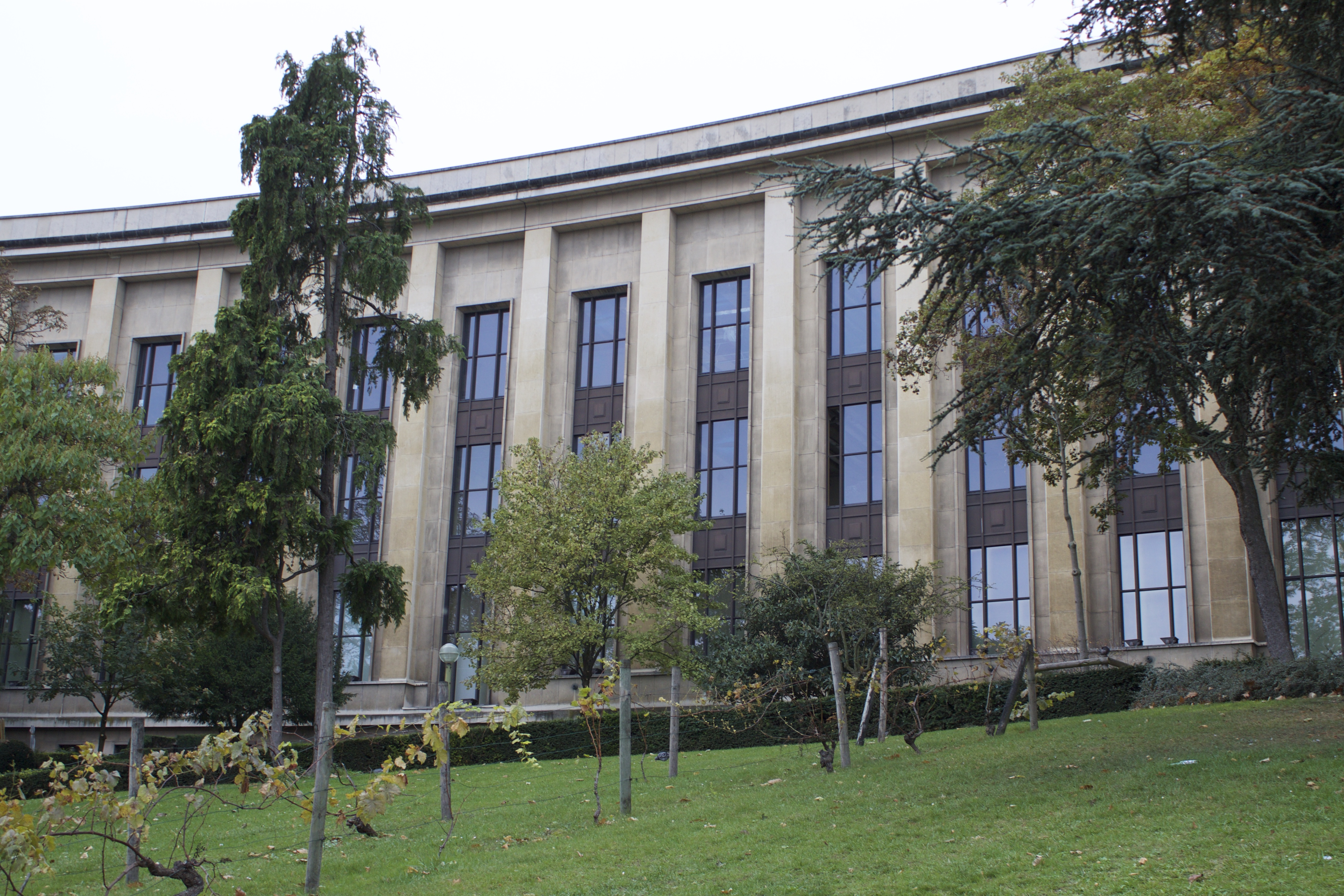
The Palais de Chaillot, 16th arrondissement.

In February 1968, under pressure from the Ministry of Finance, Malraux required changes in the management of the Cinémathèque and dismissed Henri Langlois.

A defence committee was formed, uniting notable French filmmakers (Alexandre Astruc, Claude Berri, Robert Bresson, Claude Chabrol, Jacques Doniol-Valcroze, Jean Eustache, Georges Franju, Abel Gance, Jean-Luc Godard, Joris Ivens, Pierre Kast, Chris Marker, Alain Resnais, Jacques Rivette, Eric Rohmer, Jean Rouch, François Truffaut) together with major actors (Jean-Pierre Léaud, Claude Jade, Jean Marais and Françoise Rosay). Foreign filmmakers such as Charles Chaplin and Stanley Kubrick added their support. Protests were organized.

Confrontations followed between young people, largely students, and what they saw as an authoritarian centre-right government, out of touch with the concerns of the younger generation. These demonstrations were precursors of and merged into the widespread student revolt that erupted from March 1968 onwards, escalating into nationwide unrest in May. Before then, the government had backed down over the Cinémathèque, reinstating Langlois as head in April 1968.

== Location ==
After numerous incidents—including multiple relocations from one small screening room to another through the 1950s, and a fire in its last premises—the Cinémathèque française moved in 2005 to 51, rue de Bercy, a postmodern building designed by Frank Gehry, in the 12th arrondissement of Paris.

The Bibliothèque du film, which was created in 1992 to show the history of cinema, its production, impact and artistic strength, merged with the Cinémathèque française.

Cinémathèque française operates the Musée de la cinémathèque, formerly known as Musée du cinéma Henri-Langlois, in the new building.

== President, director, and secretary ==
- President: Isabelle Huppert, actress
- Director: Frédéric Bonnaud, former critic and radio host.
- General Secretary: Alice Winocour, screenwriter and director

== Tributes ==
In celebration of the Centennial of the Metropolitan Museum of Art, the Museum and the City Center of Music and Drama in New York co-sponsored "Cinémathèque at the Metropolitan Museum". The exhibition showed seventy films dating from the medium's first seventy-five years on thirty-five consecutive evenings from July 29 to September 3, 1970. The films were selected by Henri Langlois for their significance and contributions to the history of filmmaking, including work from official film industries as well as current and early avant garde directors.

The Cinémathèque's closing is noted in François Truffaut's 1968 film Stolen Kisses. The Cinémathèque also appears in the Paul Auster 2002 novel The Book of Illusions and the 1998 Harvey Danger song "Private Helicopter".

The Cinémathèque and the events surrounding the dismissal of Langlois in 1968 features heavily in Gilbert Adair's 1988 novel The Holy Innocents also known as The Dreamers and in its 2003 film adaptation by Bernardo Bertolucci.

== See also ==
- The International Federation of Film Archives
- List of film archives
- Association des Cinémathèques Européennes - ACE (Association of European Cinematheques)
- List of works by Frank Gehry
