= Sinematek =

Sinematek (a spelling of Cinematheque in several languages) can refer to any of the following

- Sinematek Indonesia, a film archive in Indonesia
- Sinematek Turkey, a film archive in Turkey
