= Sderot Cinematheque =

Film archive in Sderot, Israel

- סינמטק שדרות
- Interactive map of Sderot Cinematheque
- Address: Sderot; Israel
- Owner: Sapir Academic College
- Type: Cinematheque

Website
- www.sderot-cin.org.il

Sderot Cinematheque is a film archive in Sderot, Israel.

The Sderot Cinematheque was established in December 1999. It was founded in cooperation with Sapir Academic College and Sderot mayor Eli Moyal.

The cinematheque hosts the Cinema South International Film Festival. It also screens the final projects of Sapir College film students.

The Cinematheque is open for screenings seven days a week. It is a member of the Coalition of Cultural and Heritage Institutions in the Negev and the Galilee, an umbrella organization seeking to create the infrastructure for discourse and cooperation between cultural and heritage institutions in the Negev and Galilee.
