= Colin Edwards (journalist) =

British journalist and documentarian

Colin Edwards (1924–1994) was a radio journalist and documentary film maker. He was also an actor, author, university lecturer, Plaid Cymru activist and founder of the American CADW (Committee to Aid the Defence of Wales). An expert on middle eastern affairs, and advisor to the United Nations and policy think-tanks, he was also interested in the arts, anthropology and science: his broadcasts included comment on the Irish theatre, European witchcraft, Congo tribal customs, chemical pesticides, the Abominable Snowman and Vernon Watkins.

== Biography ==
Colin Edwards was born in 1924, the son of Brinley and Doris Edwards. His father worked in the meat trade, was a member of the Welsh Cob Society, a dog breeder, show judge, and an amateur historian. His mother had won a scholarship to the Sorbonne, but had not taken it up and had gone into teaching. She was a member of the Swansea Writers' Circle. After her second marriage she was known as Doris Williams; as Doris Seys Pryce she published poetry in The Welsh Review and other periodicals.

Much of Colin Edwards' early life was spent at the Kingsbridge Inn, Gorseinon, near Swansea. After attending local schools, he went to the Royal Naval College, Greenwich.

During World War II in 1942 he joined the Fleet Air Arm. He flew as an observer on the Russian convoy route, was shot down over the Atlantic and later rescued.

After the war Edwards studied at St Catherine's College, Oxford, but left within a year to take up journalism at the UN headquarters in New York.

In 1949 Edwards became a combat correspondent with the British army in Malaya, and then covered the wars in Burma, Indochina and Korea.

Over the next thirty years he broadcast radio documentaries from around the world, the majority on middle eastern affairs. He also produced commentaries on the wars in Biafra, northern Ireland and Vietnam. More than two hundred of Edwards' documentaries and in-depth interviews were made available for distribution to universities and schools by the University of California at Berkeley. On 14 January 1968, Edwards covered Dr. Martin Luther King, Jr.'s final visit to northern California for Pacifica Radio.

From the 1970s Edwards virtually gave up radio reporting to concentrate on freelance lecturing and writing, including working with Yehudi Menuhin's father, Moshe, on his autobiography, The Menuhin Saga (published by Sidgwick and Jackson in 1982, and translated into four languages).

Colin Edwards died on 11 July 1994, in Oakland, California, where he and his wife, Mary, had lived for some thirty years. His ashes were brought to Swansea, and are interred at Oystermouth cemetery.

Colin Edwards was singer and broadcaster Cerys Matthews's cousin, known to her as Uncle Colin.

== Contribution to Dylan Thomas studies ==
Colin Edwards used to return to Wales almost every year. In 1958 his cousin Mrs Tilly Roberts, who had been friendly with the poet Dylan Thomas when they were teenagers, put him in touch with Thomas's mother, Florence. Mrs Thomas and Edwards talked about Dylan as a boy and young man and thought it important that someone should "bring out the Dylan known to his friends and relatives in Wales, the Dylan of the years of growing up and maturing; the 'real Dylan'...before what happened towards the end." Florence suggested that Edwards should do the interviewing, and by 1968 he was able to write that "I have interviewed one hundred and twenty-two other relations, close friends and literary colleagues of Dylan during five extended visits home to Britain, three trips to Czechoslovakia and two to Italy." By the mid-seventies, he had interviewed one hundred and fifty-one people, adding France, Switzerland and Iran to the list of countries visited.

Based on these interviews Edwards wrote an unpublished biography of Dylan, the first chapters of which - on Thomas's boyhood, school and time with the Little Theatre - are in the National Library of Wales. Edwards also made three documentaries for the Canadian Broadcasting Company, called The Real Dylan, Dylan as a Youth and My Son Dylan. On his death, Edwards's interviews were donated to the National Library of Wales. They have since been transcribed, edited and published.

The Colin Edwards collection was digitised, catalogued and made available during 2020 as part of the Unlocking Our Sound Heritage project.
