= Cinemateca Nacional de Angola =

Film archive in Luanda, Angola

The Cinemateca Nacional de Angola was a film archive located in Luanda, Angola from 1981 to 2018. It was admitted to the International Federation of Film Archives as an Observer in 1981 and then as Provisional Member in 1991. Upon its closure, the archive was succeeded by the Instituto Angolano do Cinema e do Audiovisual.

== See also ==
- List of film archives
