= Northern Ireland Screen =

National screen agency for Northern Ireland

- Logo of Northern Ireland Screen
- Formation: 1997
- Type: Non-departmental public body
- Headquarters: Belfast, Northern Ireland
- Chief Executive: Richard Williams
- Website: www.northernirelandscreen.co.uk

Northern Ireland Screen is the national screen agency for Northern Ireland. The agency's purpose is to promote the development of a sustainable film, animation and television production industry.

== History ==
Northern Ireland Screen was established as the Northern Ireland Film Council in 1989, subsequently the Northern Ireland Film & Television Commission (1997).

The agency is funded jointly by the Department of Culture, Arts and Leisure, Invest Northern Ireland and the UK Film Council. The Arts Council of Northern Ireland have delegated the administration of Lottery funding for film in Northern Ireland to Northern Ireland Screen.

Northern Ireland Screen is responsible for the £12 million Irish Language Broadcast Fund. The funds purpose is to provide for an increase in Irish-language broadcasting in Northern Ireland by the BBC and TG4.

== Notable projects ==
Northern Ireland Screen provides funding to a number of key projects relating to cinema in the region, including:

- Belfast Film Festival
- CineMagic Film Festival
- Foyle Film Festival
- Queen's Film Theatre

NIS has also participated in the digitising project Unlocking Film Heritage.

=== The Paint Hall ===
"The Paint Hall" is a historic building in Titanic Quarter, Belfast. It was once the main Harland and Wolff painting hall and includes a large indoor space. Now a film studio, originally created by film producer Jo Gilbert, it was the location for the filming of Spike Milligan's Puckoon in 2000. The building is currently on licence to Northern Ireland Screen, who have plans to offer it rent free to film makers. The Paint Hall was the location of the City of Ember in the 2008 film of the same name. Starting in 2010 it was used as the main studio for the HBO fantasy series Game of Thrones, which debuted in April 2011.

== See also ==
- Screen Ireland
- Scottish Screen
- UK Film Council
