= Cinematheque =

Organization that preserves and presents film

A cinematheque is an archive of films and film-related objects with an exhibition venue. Similarly to a book library (bibliothèque in French), a cinematheque is responsible for preserving and making available to the public film heritage. Typically, a cinematheque has at least one motion picture theatre, which offers screenings of its collections and other international films.

== History ==
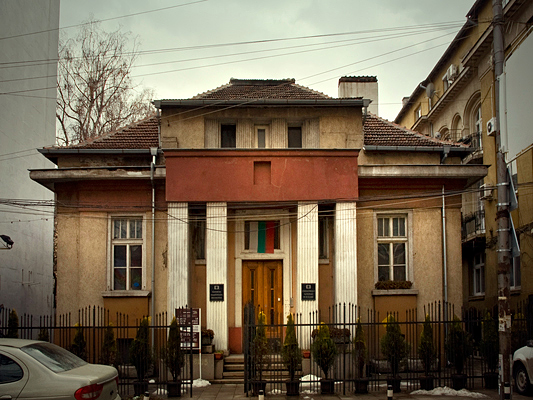
Main facade of the head office, Bulgarian National Film Archive (Българска Национална Филмотека)

From the first cinema screenings until 1930, several attempts to establish film archives were initiated in Europe, the US and Russia. As early as 1898, the photographer and cameraman Bolesław Matuszewski evoked the idea of a film archive. "It is a matter of giving this perhaps privileged source of history the same authority, the same official existence, the same access as to other archives already known". The "Archives of the Planet” (Les Archives de la planète) were established by French banker Albert Kahn, between 1912 and 1931. Military film archives were also created in France, Germany and Great Britain after the First World War. The cinematheque of the city of Paris, for educational purposes, was created in 1925.

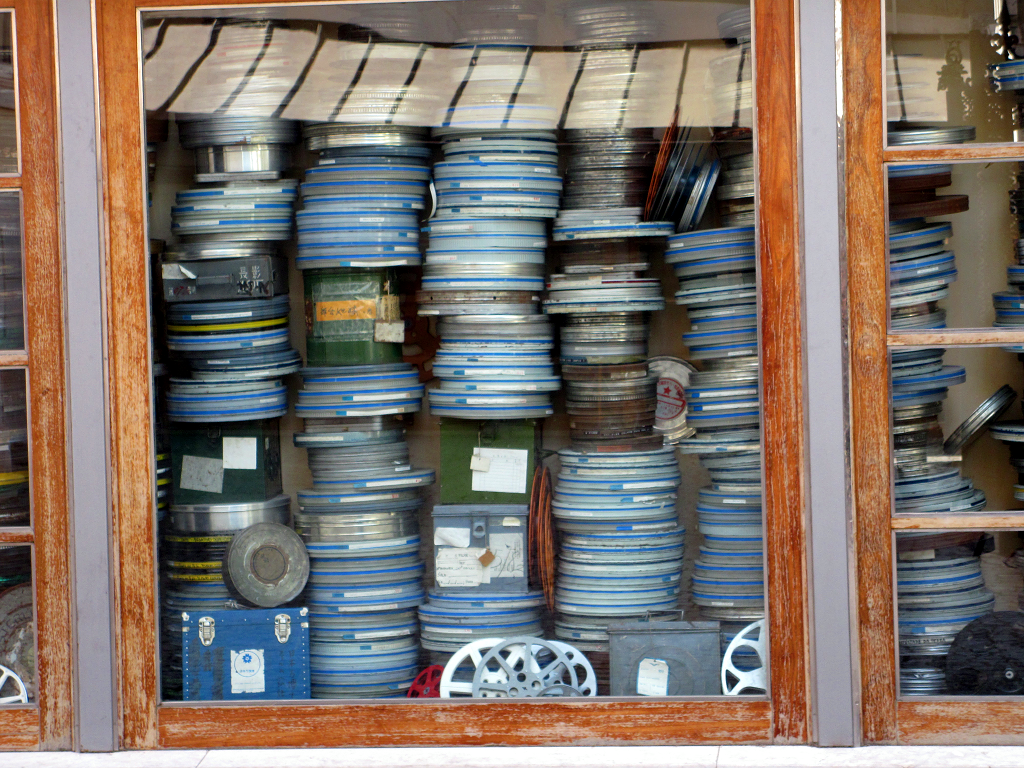
Film reels at the Cinemateca Portuguesa, in Portugal

However, it was not until the 1930s and the awareness of the destruction of films at the time of the transition to sound movies that the first film archives emerged. Some of the first formal film archives were created: in Stockholm in 1933, the Reichsfilmarchiv in Berlin in 1934, the National Film Library in London and the Film Library at the Museum of Modern Art in New York in 1935, the National Historical Film and Speaking Record Library of Australia in 1935, the Cinémathèque française in Paris created in 1936. In 1938, the International Federation of Film Archives was created, bringing together institutions devoted to cinematographic heritage. On 27 October 1980, the General Conference of UNESCO adopted the "Recommendation for the Safeguarding and Preservation of Moving Images" which recognizes the need to preserve and provide access to cinematographic heritage. In 1991, the Association of European Cinematheques (ACE - Association des Cinémathèques Européennes) was established.

== Africa ==
Morocco

- Tangier Cinematheque at Cinema Rif in Tangier

== Americas ==
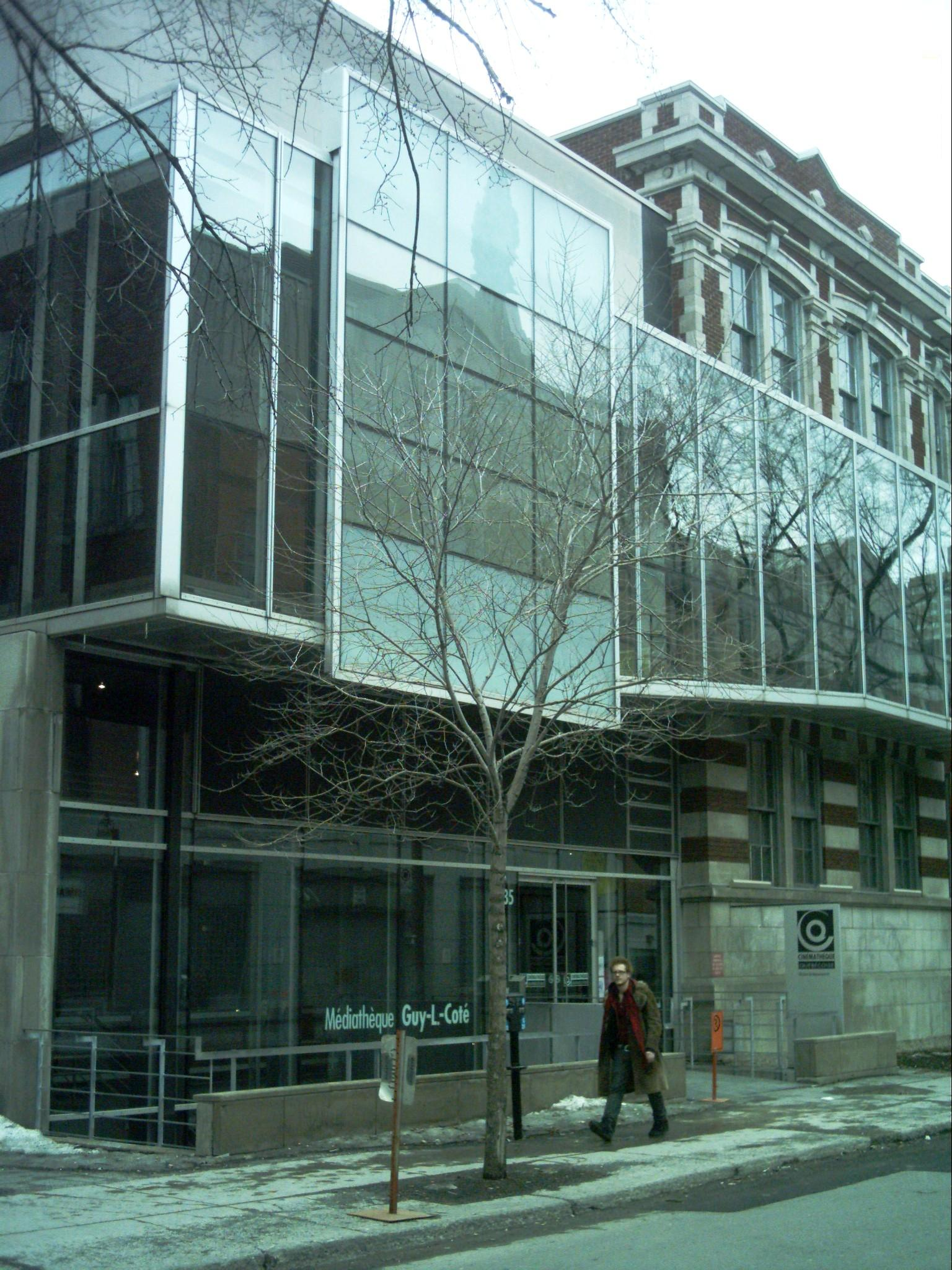
The Cinémathèque québécoise, Montreal

Canada

- Cinémathèque québécoise in Montreal
- The Cinematheque in Vancouver
- TIFF Cinematheque in Toronto
- Cinematheque Waterloo in Waterloo
- Winnipeg Film Group's Cinematheque in Winnipeg

United States of America

- UCLA Film and Television Archive in Los Angeles
- American Cinematheque in Los Angeles
- Berkeley Art Museum and Pacific Film Archive
- San Francisco Cinematheque in San Francisco
- Gene Siskel Film Center in Chicago
- Cleveland Cinematheque in Cleveland
- National Audio-Visual Conservation Center in Culpeper, Virginia
- AFI Silver Theatre and Cultural Center in Silver Spring, Maryland
- University of Virginia Cinematheque in Charlottesville
- Cinematheque at University of Wisconsin–Madison

Mexico

- Cineteca Nacional in Mexico City
- Filmoteca de la UNAM in Mexico City
- Cineteca Mexiquense in Toluca, State of Mexico
- Cineteca Nuevo León in Monterrey, Nuevo León

Venezuela

- Cinemateca Nacional de Venezuela in Caracas
- Cine Archivo Bolívar Films in Caracas
- Archivo Departamento de Cine de la Universidad de los Andes, Mérida

Other countries

- Cinemateca Distrital de Bogotá in Bogotá, Colombia
- Cinemateca del Caribe in Barranquilla, Colombia
- Cinemateca Uruguaya in Montevideo, Uruguay
- Cinemateca Brasileira in São Paulo, Brazil
- Filmoteca PUCP in Lima, Perú

== Asia ==
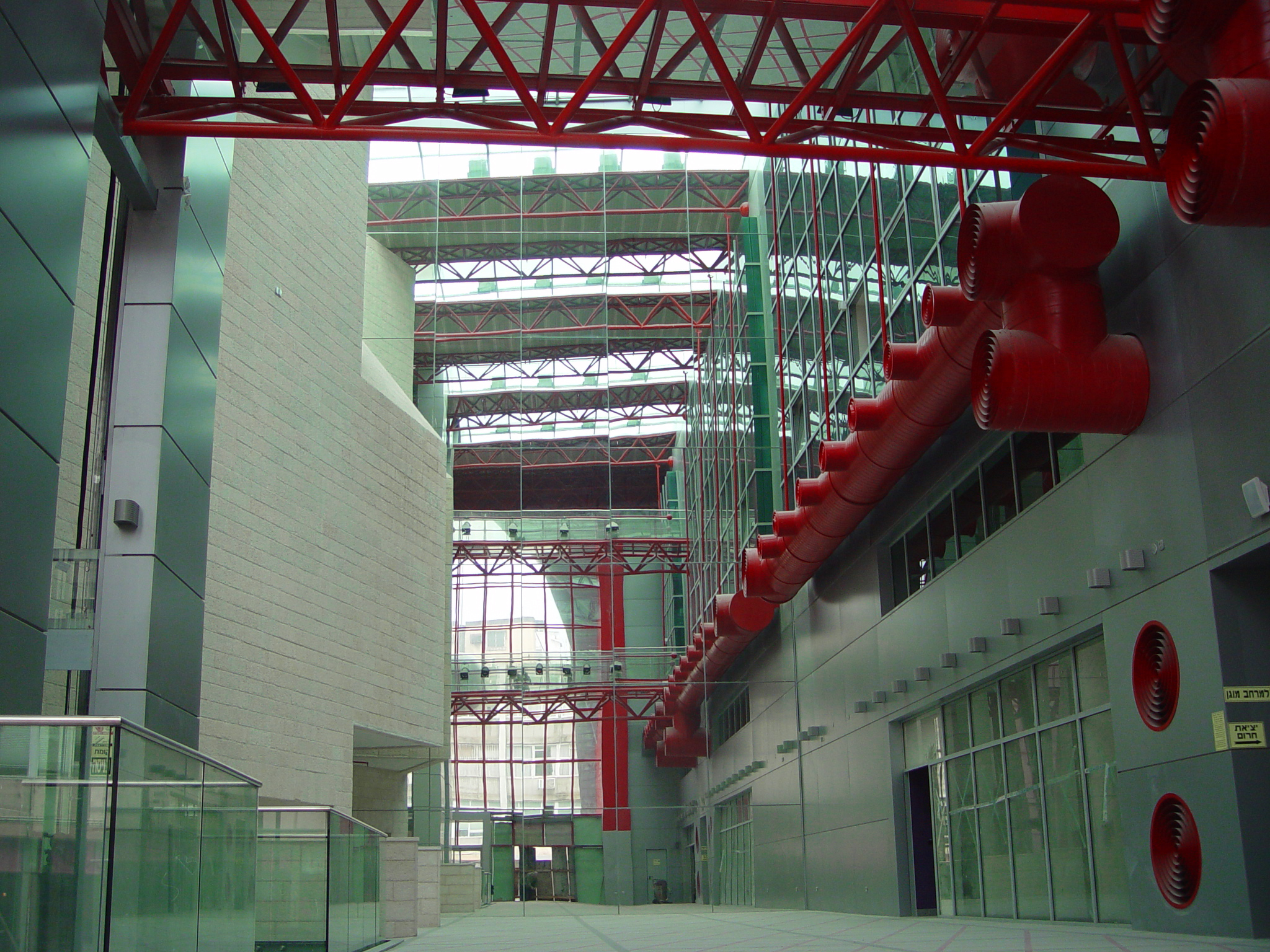
Entrance to the new Tel Aviv Cinematheque

China

- China Film Archive in Beijing

Indonesia

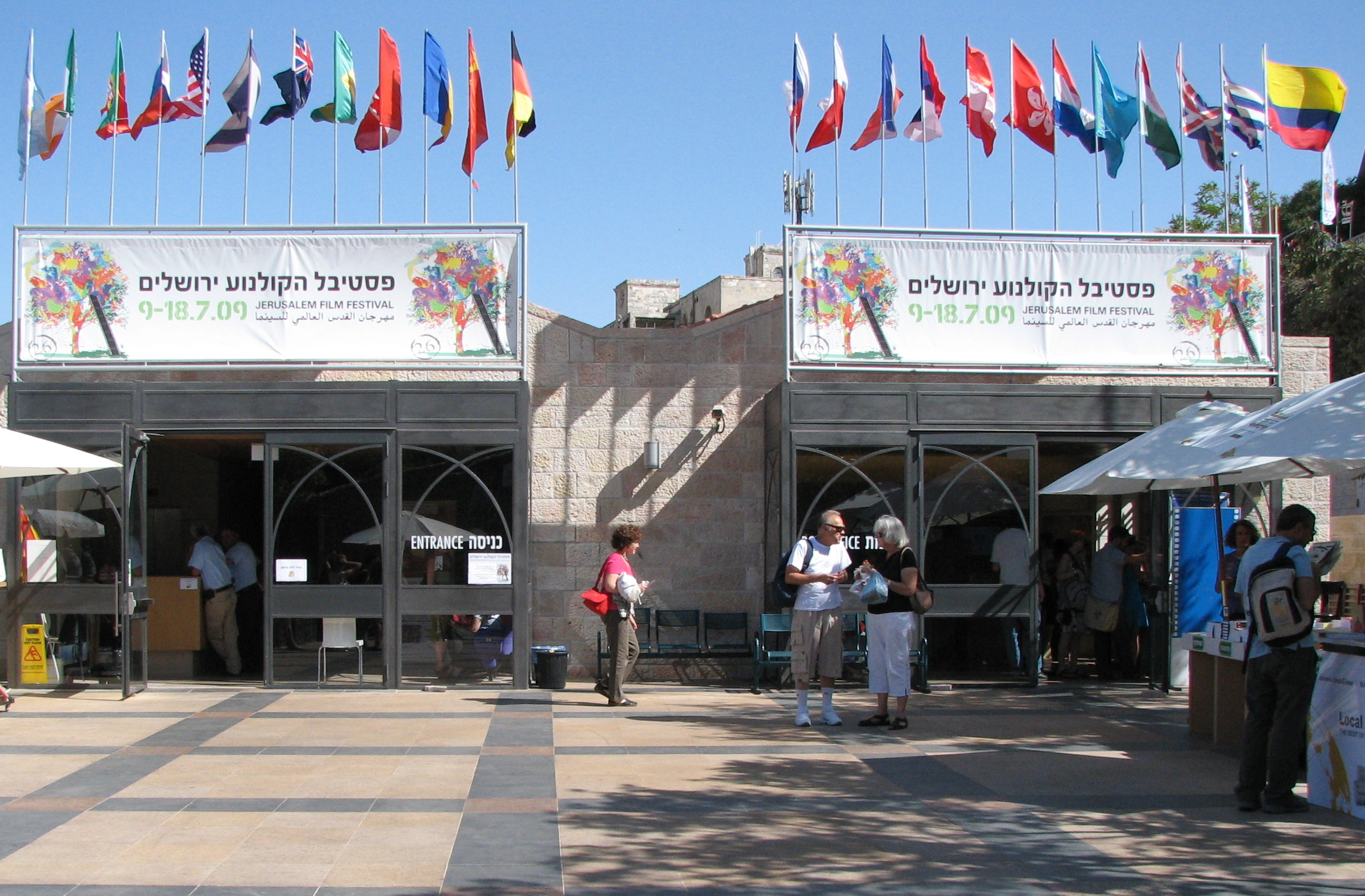
Jerusalem Cinematheque

- Sinematek Indonesia in Jakarta

Iran

- Tehran Cinematheque in Tehran
- Pardis Gholhak Cinematheque in Tehran

Israel

- Jerusalem Cinematheque in Jerusalem
- Tel Aviv Cinematheque in Tel Aviv
- Haifa Cinematheque in Haifa
- Herzliya Cinematheque in Herzliya
- Holon Cinematheque in Holon
- Sderot Cinematheque in Sderot
- Rosh Pina Cinematheque in Rosh Pinna

Singapore

- Asian Film Archive in Singapore

South Korea

- Korean Film Archive in Seoul
- Cinematheque Busan in Busan

Vietnam

- Hanoi Cinematheque in Hanoi

== Europe ==
- ACE - Association des Cinémathèques Européennes, an affiliation of 49 national and regional European cinematheques.

Armenia

- Armenian National Cinematheque in Yerevan

Belgium

- CINEMATEK in Brussels
- Cinémathèque de la Fédération Wallonie-Bruxelles in Brussels

Bulgaria

- Bulgarian National Film Archive (Българска Национална Филмотека) in Sofia

Czech Republic

- Národní filmový archiv in Prague (and its Ponrepo cinema)

Denmark

- Cinemateket in Copenhagen

France

- Cinémathèque Française in Paris
- Cinémathèque de Nice in Nice
- Cinémathèque de Bretagne in Brest
- Cinémathèque de Toulouse
- Cinematheque de Saint-Etienne in Saint-Etiennne
- Cinémathèque d'images de montagne (Cinematheque of mountain images) in Gap in the French Alps
- Cinémathèque de Grenoble in Grenoble
- Cinémathèque Jean Marie Boursicot in Marseille, dedicated exclusively to the conservation of advertising film, enriched every year, by an additional 25 000 films sent by 750 advertising agency correspondents in 80 countries.
- Cinémathèque Méliès in Paris, collects, preserves and promotes the work of Georges Méliès
- Cinémathèque de Nouvelle-Aquitaine in Limoges
- Cinémathèque Hauts-de-France
- Cinémathèque Robert-Lynen founded in 1926 in Paris. One of the things that sets it apart from other cinematheques is that it is used for educational purposes by schools (from nursery to high school).
- Département Son, vidéo, multimedia de la Bibliothèque nationale de France in the National Library of France, founded in 1461 in Paris
- Cinémathèque du documentaire in Paris, responsible for supporting and promoting the production and distribution of works in the documentary genre.
- Cinémathèque régionale de Bourgogne Jean-Douchet in Dijon, Burgundy
- National Audiovisual Institute is the repository of all French radio and television audiovisual archives. It has allowed free online consultation on a website called ina.fr with a search tool indexing 100,000 archives of historical programs, for a total of 20,000 hours.
- Archives françaises du film is part of the National Centre for Cinema are both located in the Fort de Bois-d'Arcy, southwest of Paris.
- GP Archives (GP for Gaumont Pathé)

Germany

- Deutsche Kinemathek in Berlin,
- DFF Deutsches Filmnstitut & Filmmuseum in Frankfurt
- Filmmuseum Potsdam Institut der Filmuniversität Babelsberg KONRAD WOLF in Potsdam
- Film Museum München in Munich
- Filmmuseum der Landeshauptstadt Düsseldorf in Düsseldorf

Italy

- Cineteca Nazionale in Rome
- Cineteca Italiana in Milan
- Cineteca di Bologna in Bologna

Luxembourg

- Cinémathèque de la Ville de Luxembourg in Luxembourg City

Norway

- Cinemateket in Oslo
- Cinemateket in Trondheim
- Cinemateket in Bergen

Poland

- Iluzjon - Film Art Museum in Warsaw

Portugal

- Cinemateca Portuguesa in Lisbon

Romania

- Arhiva Nationala de Filme - Cinemateca in Bucharest

Serbia

- State Audiovisual Archives of Serbia – Yugoslav Cinematheque in Belgrade

Slovenia

- Slovenska kinoteka in Ljubljana

Spain

- Filmoteca de Catalunya in Barcelona
- Filmoteca Española in Madrid
- Filmoteca de Galica in A Coruña
- Instituto Valenciano de Cinematografía in Valencia

Sweden

- Cinemateket in Stockholm

Ukraine

- Oleksandr Dovzhenko National Centre in Kyiv

United Kingdom

- British Film Institute in London

Switzerland

- Cinémathèque suisse in Lausanne

== Oceania ==
Australia

- Arc Cinema at the National Film and Sound Archive of Australia in Canberra, ACT
- Australian Cinémathèque in the Queensland Gallery of Modern Art, Brisbane, Queensland
- Melbourne Cinematheque in Melbourne, Victoria
- Adelaide Cinémathèque in the Mercury Cinema, Adelaide, South Australia

== See also ==
- Lists of film archives
