= Unlocking Our Sound Heritage =

British sound archive project

'Unlocking Our Sound Heritage' (UOSH) is a UK-wide project that aims to preserve, digitise and provide public access to a large part of the nation's sound heritage. The UOSH project forms part of the core programme 'Save Our Sounds' led by the British Library and involving a consortium of ten regional and national archival institutions. Between 2017 and 2022 the aim is to digitise and make available up to 500,000 rare and unique sounds recordings, not only from the British Library's collection but from across the UK, dating from the birth of recorded sound in the 1880s to the present time. The recordings include sounds such as local dialects and accents, oral histories, previously inaccessible musical performances and plays, and rare wildlife sounds. The consortium will also deliver various public engagement programmes, and a website where up to 100,000 recordings will be freely available to everyone for research, enjoyment and inspiration.

== Save Our Sounds ==
Launched in January 2015, 'Save our Sounds' is the British Library's initiative to preserve and make available rare and unique sound recordings, create a radio archive and create a technical infrastructure that will allow born digital music to be preserved.

In 2015, the British Library gathered information on the sound collections held by institutions, societies, associations, trusts, companies and individual collectors. 488 collection holders were identified, which together had 3,015 collections, containing 1.9 million items. Most of the information from the audit can be found in the 'UK Sound Directory'.

According to a consensus of international sound archivists, there is only a finite number of years before sound collections become unplayable and effectively lost. This is because some formats such as wax cylinders and acetate discs start to naturally decay and equipment required to play some formats will become obsolete. The solution to counteract this is to digitise the recordings and make sure that existing archival material is properly preserved. It is also important to have adequate systems in place for the acquisition of future sound production. 'Save the Sounds' therefore has three major aims, to:

- Preserve, digitise and make available as many as possible of UK's rare and unique sound recordings. This will be achieved through the 'Unlocking Our Sound Heritage' project between 2017 and 2022, by a consortium of ten national and regional archival institutions, other selected content contributors, various volunteer organisations and individuals.
- Establish a radio archive that will collect, protect and share a substantial part of the UK's radio output. This will be carried out by working with the radio industry and other partners.
- Invest in new technology so that music in digital formats can be received and to ensure long-term preservation in the future. This will be realised by working with music labels and industry partners.

The British Library is also developing a new 'Universal Player' for audio as part of the programme.

== UOSH and the British Library ==
The project was developed in response to, the very real, risk of losing historic recordings forever as the tapes and discs deteriorated, the increasing costs of old playback equipment and a lack of specialist skills. Between 2017 and 2022, the aim of the UOSH project has been to preserve, digitise and publish online thousands of rare, unique and at-risk sound recordings from the British Library as well as from other collections around the UK. The consortium has created a network of ten audio preservation centres with staff in place to catalogue and digitally preserve audio recordings. The centres will also deliver programmes of public engagement and outreach activities, including workshops, tours, exhibitions and events.

In 2021 a newly developed, purpose-built media player and website, hosted by the British Library, is scheduled to be launched. It will allow the public freely to explore and access recordings that have been cleared for online publication. The regional archival institutions will provide onsite access to their own recordings and those that do not have licences and permissions to be published online. All the digitised recordings can be found in the British Library's 'Sound and Moving Image' (SAMI) catalogue.

The National Lottery Heritage Fund provided the UOSH project with a £9.5 million grant and other donors include the Garfield Weston Foundation, the Foyle Foundation, the Headley Trust, the British Library Trust and American Trust for the British Library, as well as other charities and individuals. The total project funding has now reached £18.8 million.

The British Library alone houses over 6.5 million recordings, which feature speech in all spoken languages, music, theatre, radio programmes, oral history, wildlife and environmental sounds from all over the world. Some of the collections and recordings which will be digitised include: slang, dialects and accents from every social class and regional area in the UK, from the 1950s 'Survey of English Dialects collection' to the 'BBC Voices archive'; writers reading their own works, including Alfred, Lord Tennyson, Sylvia Plath and James Joyce; a collection held in the Canterbury Cathedral archives spanning 50 years of services, choral and opera performances; oral histories from World War I and World War II; pirate radio; sound recordings of British wildlife, coastlines and nature, for example calls of long extinct birds and a recording that helped to save the bittern from extinction in the UK; musical performances and theatre plays, including Laurence Olivier playing 'Coriolanus' in 1959; traditional, pop and world music; oral history interviews with people from all walks of life, ranging from Kindertransport refugees, migrant workers to second wave feminists and people with disabilities; radio broadcasts going back to the 1930s, including international pre-war stations such as Radio Luxembourg, Radio Lyons, Radio Normandie as well as early previously unheard BBC Radio recordings with American blues, gospel and jazz legends such as Louis Armstrong, Sonny Terry and Sister Rosetta Tharpe.

== Participating institutions ==
=== Archives+ in Manchester ===
Archives+ at Manchester Central Library is the centre for the North West region, which covers libraries, archives and museums from Cumbria, Cheshire, Greater Manchester, Lancashire and Merseyside. Some of the collections and recordings included in the UOSH project are: 'Manchester Studies oral history archive' created by academics at Manchester Polytechnic during the 1970s and 1980s; the 'Manchester Voices' accents and dialects project ('Manchester Metropolitan University'); interviews with a sword-swallower, a suffragette, the organiser of the Mass Trespass of Kinder Scout, granddaughter of a woman who witnessed the aftermath of the Peterloo massacre; a gig by Paul Simon, and recordings of killer whales made in the waters surrounding Shetland held by the Centre for Wildlife Conservation at the University of Cumbria. One collection that will be useful for family and social historians is the 'Manchester Studies collection' which includes interviews with people from all over Greater Manchester, who were born in the late nineteenth and early twentieth centuries. The collection provides a snapshot of working-class life in the first half of the twentieth century and interviews cover subjects such as life histories, pioneering women in politics, trades unions, domestic service, the cotton industry, pawnbroking, Trafford Park, music halls, maternity services and housing.

=== Bristol Culture ===
Bristol Archives (part of Bristol Culture) is working together with 14 museums, archives and institutions in South West England including Kresen Kernow, Gloucestershire Archives and the South West Heritage Trust. Some of the collections being digitised by Bristol Archives include oral history recordings from the British Empire and Commonwealth collection, performances from St Pauls Carnival, 1960s hospital radio from Gloucestershire, and Cornish oral histories and music. The digitised and catalogued recordings will be preserved at the British Library, with local copies also available to listen to at the relevant local reading rooms. Copyright-cleared material will be made available online via the British Library website as well as Bristol Archives' online catalogue.

=== London Metropolitan Archives ===
Between 2018 and 2021 London Metropolitan Archives aims to digitise and catalogue sound recordings from their own audio collections as well as those held at local archives, universities, museums and galleries across the Greater London area, including Tate, the Royal National Theatre in London, the Royal Institution of Great Britain and the School of Oriental and African Studies (SOAS), as well as borough archives such as Hackney, Brent, and Southwark. The recordings cover everything from oral histories, world music and academic lectures to urban soundscapes.

=== National Library of Scotland ===
The National Library of Scotland will be working with 17 different collection partners to digitise, catalogue and clear rights to showcase archival recordings online or on-site. The collections are varied, encompassing oral history, lectures and presentations, traditional music and wildlife recordings that originate from all over Scotland. The Library has also developed an artist-in-residence programme as part of the UOSH project. The first engagement was Val O'Regan from Birdhouse Studio in Argyll, who worked with Innellan Primary School and Benmore Botanic Gardens to create new artistic works inspired by the Scottish Ornithologists' Club's collection of birdsong and interviews with ornithologists. The Library also has an ambitious volunteer programme both in Glasgow and remotely to digitise, contextualise and curate the content of the recordings. There are also ongoing engagement projects with schools and higher education institutions.

=== National Library of Wales ===
Sound & Screen Archive is the department of the National Library of Wales that cares for sound and audiovisual archival materials. The sound collections encompass many aspect of Welsh culture and life in Wales, including private recordings – such as concerts, interviews, lectures, readings, oral history interviews and radio programmes – as well as commercial material. There are also sound recordings that extend beyond the boundaries of Wales, helping to place the rest of the collections in a wider context. During the UOSH project, sound recordings on various formats including wax cylinder, vinyl, reel-to-reel tapes, cassettes and MiniDiscs will be digitised, catalogued and made accessible. The material includes interviews with Welsh migrants to North America and Patagonia, dialect recordings, lectures, interviews with industry workers, their families and the community, archives of Welsh traditional music and political speeches by national politicians.

The following sound collections and recordings will be digitised as part of the UOSH project:

- 'Clwyd Oral History collection'
- 'Glenys James collection'
- 'Colin Edwards collection'
- 'Creating Memory (Creu Cof) collection'
- 'Llanrwst Memory project'
- Y Gadwyn Collection (the first Welsh language magazine for blind and partially sighted people)
- 'Powysland Club collection'
- the 'Ceramic Archive collection' from University of Wales Aberystwyth
- 'Story of the Forest collection'
- 'BBC Radio Cymru collection', including recordings dating back to the late 1930s recorded for the BBC Home Service
- the 'Wax Cylinder collection', including the only known recording of Welsh Revivalist preacher Evan Roberts, made in 1904/5
- 'Tredegar Library collection'
- 'St Fagans collection' from St Fagans National Museum of History
- 'Tiger Bay Heritage & Cultural Exchange collection'
- 'Archive of Traditional Music in Wales' (Archif Cerdd Draddodiadol Cymru) from University of Wales Bangor
- the 'Cardiff Business Club collection', comprising speeches made from 1993 onwards to the Cardiff business community
- 'Ceredigion Library collection' containing oral history interviews with people from Ceredigion during the 1960s and 1970s

Some notable recordings include the 1949 'Eisteddfod Genedlaethol' in Dolgellau, the Cynog Dafis interview with Kate Davies, the poem In Parenthesis read by David Jones and the speech Why should we not sing? by David Lloyd George.

As part of the UOSH project, Screen & Sound is working with communities and special interest groups in the Welsh regions. In spring 2020, it announced 20 commissions of £100 to enable composers, musicians and choirs to create new and unique works during the COVID-19 lockdown, by using digitised sound recordings from the collection as inspiration. The aim was to create new interpretations of the sound collections, based on oral histories recorded from various parts of Wales, and present the work in new and exciting ways. The commissioned work will be filmed and displayed on various websites and NLW's social media accounts.

=== National Museums Northern Ireland ===
Since 2018 as part of UOSH, National Museums Northern Ireland has already digitised and catalogued over 4,000 recordings from open reels, CDs and cassettes held in its sound archive at the Ulster Folk and Transport Museum, Cultra. These eclectic recordings were collected by curators of the Folk Museum since the early 1960s to capture ways of life that were disappearing. Highlights include many tales of folklore, featuring fairies, ghosts, banshees, cures, childbirth, weddings and wakes; extensive interviews on Ulster's churches, religious societies, fraternities and traveller groups; past and present on Rathlin Island; diverse musical pieces, from the Belfast Harp Orchestra to blind fiddlers and Lambeg drummers; famous flautists James Galway and Matt Molloy, uilleann pipers Séamus Ennis and Liam O'Flynn, and traditional singers Maighréad Ní Dhomhnaill and Mairéad Ní Mhaonaigh; accounts of domestic life, agriculture, fishing, turf-cutting, and the origins and vernacular buildings of the Ulster Folk Museum; stories of crafts such as embroidery, lacemaking and weaving; oral history interviews about various Ulster industries, such as textile and linen factories, and transport – from Harland & Wolff's shipyards to champion motorcyclists, biker culture, Belfast's black taxis and the DeLorean Motor Company factory; the loyalist lion-keeper, 'Buck Alec' Alexander Robinson; and 500-plus interviews of the Tape-Recorded Survey, a study of Hiberno-English dialects around Ireland in the 1970s.

Most of these recordings coincided with The Troubles, and while political figures such as Rev. Ian Paisley, John Hume, Richard Needham and Charles Haughey feature among the voices, few other recordings focus directly on the conflict. Nonetheless, the tapes provide valuable insights into how 'ordinary' life carried on throughout. There are also numerous clues to the causes and symptoms of communal strife, even in the sectarian lyrics to children's playground rhymes in the late 1960s.

National Museums Northern Ireland is also digitally preserving the collections of six partner institutions, from the Glens of Antrim Historical Society to Manx National Heritage. Project outreach work has involved engagement programmes for local community groups, and providing content from May Blair's interviews with former Lagan Navigation workers for the Waterways Community's Storymaking Festival.

=== Norfolk Record Office ===
Over three years Norfolk Record Office aims to digitise sound recordings from their own collections as well as from other collections in the East of England.

=== The Keep, Brighton ===
The South East centre for the UOSH project (Keep Sounds) is based at The Keep in Brighton. The project is preserving sound recordings held by East Sussex and Brighton & Hove Records Office (ESBHRO), the University of Sussex Special Collections, the Royal Pavilion & Museums Trust (RPMT), Eden Valley Museum, the National Motor Museum Trust at Beaulieu, Southampton Archives and Wessex Film & Sound Archive (WFSA) at Hampshire Archives. The recordings being digitised include oral history interviews from across the region, exploring all areas of working and domestic life in the 20th century; home recordings from the Copper Family, talks from the modern iteration of the Headstrong Club and a large collection of talks from the Friends of the Motor Museum Trust.

=== Tyne & Wear Archives and Museums ===
Tyne & Wear Archives and Museums is the centre for the North East and Yorkshire. The sound recordings will be digitised on-site at the Discovery Museum in Newcastle upon Tyne.

=== University of Leicester ===
The Midlands centre for the project is based in Special Collections in the David Wilson Library at the University of Leicester. Material is being preserved from collections held in Birmingham, Derbyshire, Herefordshire, Leicestershire, Nottinghamshire, Rutland, Shropshire, Staffordshire, Warwickshire and Worcestershire.

== Listening Desk by Emily Peasgood ==
In 2023 British Library commissioned sound artist Emily Peasgood to create a listening desk as legacy for Unlocking Our Sound Heritage.

== See also ==
- Unlocking Film Heritage Project is a UK-wide digitising project for audiovisual archival material.
- Endangered Archive Programme
- Theatre Archive Project
- Qatar Digital Library
