= Cinémathèque nationale du Liban =

The Cinémathèque nationale du Liban is a film archive in Beirut, Lebanon. It is Lebanon’s national archive dedicated to preserving the country’s cinematic heritage.

The Cinémathèque was initially founded in 1999 during the tenure of Minister of Culture Mohammad Youssef Beydoun as part of a series of cultural initiatives launched after UNESCO designated Beirut as the Arab Cultural Capital for that year. At the time, the Cinémathèque was housed in the Ministry of Culture’s offices in Beirut’s Verdun district.

It was later shut down amid bureaucratic challenges and corruption.

On Thursday, June 20, 2024, the Cinémathèque was officially reopened at the Lebanese National Library by Lebanese Minister of Culture Ghassan Salamé.

The Cinémathèque includes an online database featuring hundreds of Lebanese film productions, providing an important resource for preserving and documenting the country’s cinematic history.

== See also ==
- List of film archives
