= Theatre Archive Project =

Historical British theatre project

The Theatre Archive Project is an ongoing project to reinvestigate British theatre history from 1945 to 1968, from the perspectives of both the theatregoer and the practitioner. The project is a collaboration between the British Library and the De Montfort University, and is funded by the Arts and Humanities Research Council (AHRC). The project comprises a number of strands that support study of this period of British theatre history, as well as an opportunity to analyse and debate findings through a blog.

== The Archives Strand ==
The Archives strand has enabled listings to be compiled for four major theatre archives in the British Library Manuscripts Collections. Fully searchable listings are accessible for the archives of Sir John Gielgud, Cedric Hardwicke, Sir Ralph Richardson and Michel Saint-Denis, and each description is preceded by a full biographical introduction prepared by an expert in the field. Manuscript material identified from the listings can be consulted in the Manuscripts Reading Room at the British Library.

== The Scripts Strand ==
The Scripts strand aims to recover play scripts performed in any licensed British venue after 1968 that were never deposited in the British Library, as stipulated by the Theatres Act 1968 that ended the Lord Chamberlain's power to pre-censor theatre. Between September 2004 and April 2005 over 1,000 missing scripts were identified from fewer than 100 theatres. To date, nearly 300 of these play scripts have been recovered and deposited within the British Library Manuscripts Collections. Further information is available in 'Following the Script' by Kate Dorney.

== The Oral History Strand ==
The Oral History strand began in November 2003, and aims to interview as many people as possible who visited or worked in the theatre between 1945 and 1968. The original recordings may be consulted via the British Library Archival Sound Recordings where full, searchable transcripts are available. Over 250 interviews have been added to the site, and interviewees include Frith Banbury, Michael Frayn, Trevor Griffiths, Glenda Jackson, Ann Jellicoe, Ian McDiarmid, Peter Nichols, Corin Redgrave, Arnold Wesker, Timothy West.

== The Blog ==
The Blog was launched at the 'More than just Osborne?' conference, held at the British Library in September 2006. It allows students, researchers, and theatre lovers to address and debate some of the findings of the Theatre Archive Project, and to share views and opinions of the post-War British theatre scene. Recent posts include discussion of Joe Orton, Harold Pinter, and Bertolt Brecht.

== Similar projects ==
- Unlocking Our Sound Heritage – UK project for digitising project for audio archival material
- Unlocking Film Heritage – UK project for digitising audiovisual archival material
- Endangered Archives Programme - British Library programme for preserving cultural heritage
- Qatar Digital Library
