= Cinemateca do Museu de Arte Moderna =

Film archive in Brazil

Cinemateca do Museu de Arte Moderna is a film archive located in Rio de Janeiro, Brazil. Its collection comprises 80,000 film reels and a 10,000 volumes library. It was founded in 1948.

== See also ==
- List of film archives
- Cinema of Brazil
