= Dargāh of Shaykh Kamāl al-Dīn =

Shrine in Dhar, Madhya Pradesh, India

The Dargāh of Kamāl al-Dīn Chishtī is a tomb located within a walled enclosure with several other tombs in the centre of old Dhar, Madhya Pradesh. Shaykh Kamāl Mālvī or Kamāl al-Dīn arrived in Malwa in the late 13th century and died there in about 1331. He was a descendant of Farīd al-Dīn Gaṅj-i Shakar (circa 1173–1266) and follower of the Chishti saint Nizamuddin Auliya (1238–1325). Some details about Kamāl al-Dīn are recorded in Muḥammad Ghauthi's Azkar-i Abrar, a hagiography of Sufi saints written in 1613. The cloak presented to Kamāl al-Dīn by Nizam al-Dīn is still displayed inside the tomb. The custodians of the tomb, Kamāl al-Dīn's direct descendants, have served continuously for 700 years.

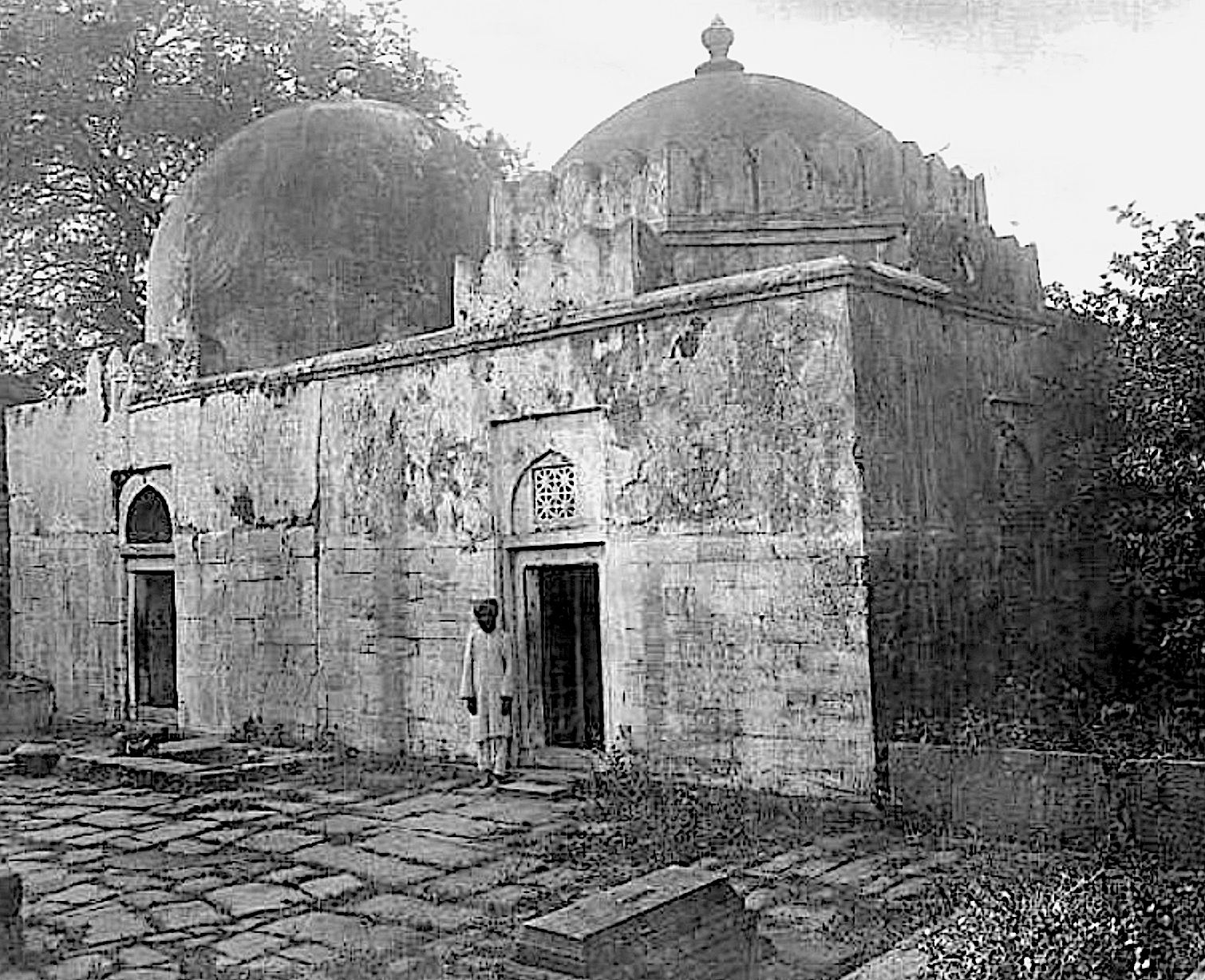
Dhār, Madhya Pradesh. Dargāh of Kamāl al-Dīn Chishtī, as photographed in 1912 by Vernon & Company (Bombay) at the time of Viceroy Lord Hardinge's visit to Dhār.

== Architecture ==
The tomb was built in the 14th century as testified by a long inscription of that time inside the shrine. The inscription gives the text of the Qur'ān 36 (Ya-Sin) and is written in the type of Thuluth script was favoured under the Tughluq dynasty. For many years covered with layers of white-wash, the stone was cleaned and identified shortly before 2024.

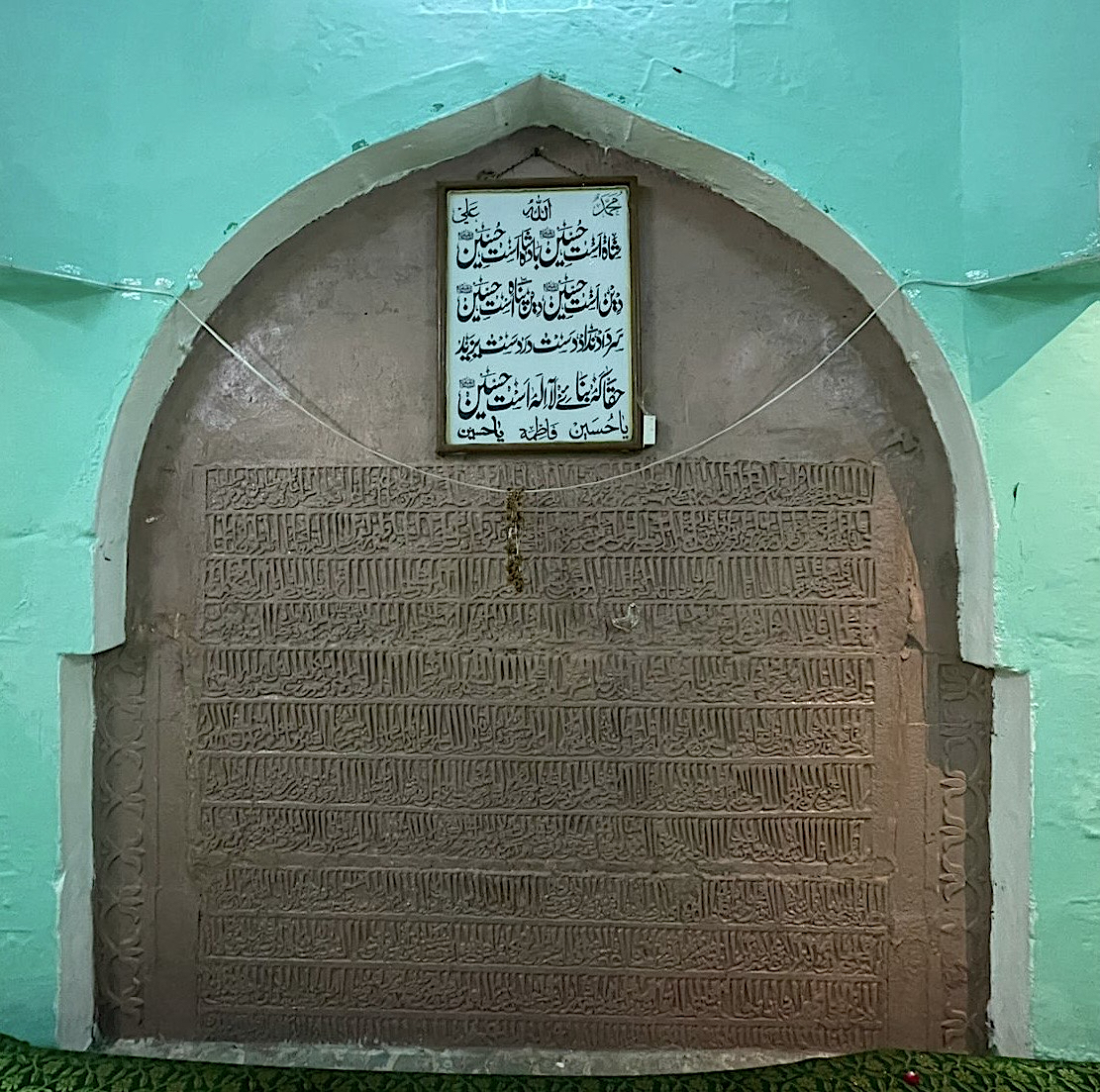
Dhār, Madhya Pradesh. Inscription inside Dargāh of Kamāl-al Dīn Chishtī, 14th century. This is the largest Tughluq inscription in India.

The shrine was repaired and supplemented by the Sultans of Malwa in the 15th century, at which time a surrounding wall and gatehouse were added. Inside the gatehouse under the dome is a long Persian language inscription, according to which the shrine was enlarged to accommodate poor and needy pilgrims and pious men in AH 861 (1456-57 CE).

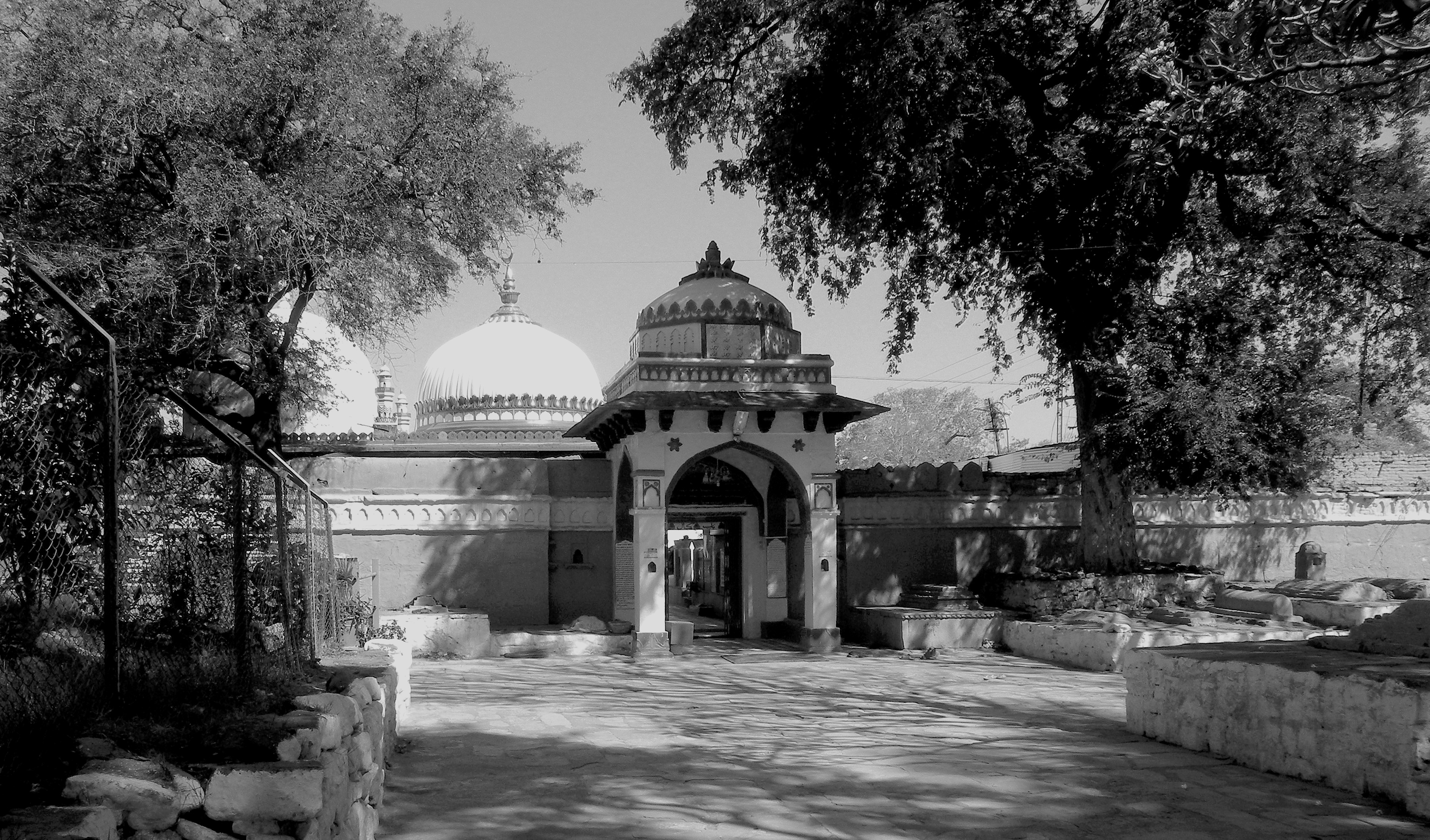
Dhār, Madhya Pradesh. Gatehouse to the Dargāh precinct, built in 1456–57, as documented 2010.

The dome over Kamāl al-Dīn's tomb was rebuilt in the 20th century, the ribbed design based on the memorials to the Powar rulers in Dhār.

== History ==
The economic and social histories of the Dargāh are told by a series of documents dating from the 17th century to the 20th. These have been digitized in a project carried out under the auspices of the French Institute of Pondicherry, funded by the Endangered Archives Programme at the British Library. All the documents are visible online. The oldest of the documents is a certificate dating to 1695 that confirms the land holdings of the shrine in the time of Shaykh Nūr al-Dīn, the custodian of the Dargāh at the time.

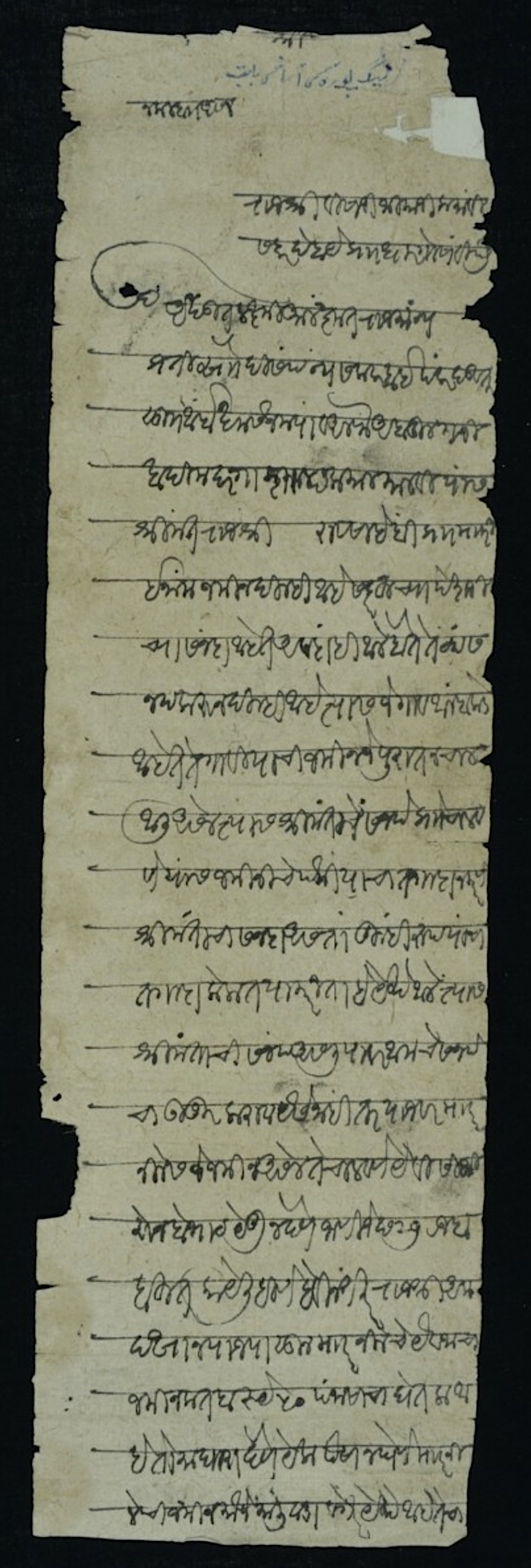
Royal order from Rānī Sakwār Bāī of the Pawār dynasty at Dhār issued to ‘Abd al-Ghanī Chishtī in 1753. The order reaffirms the Dargāh's ancient holdings of gifted land.
