= Cinémathèque de Bretagne =

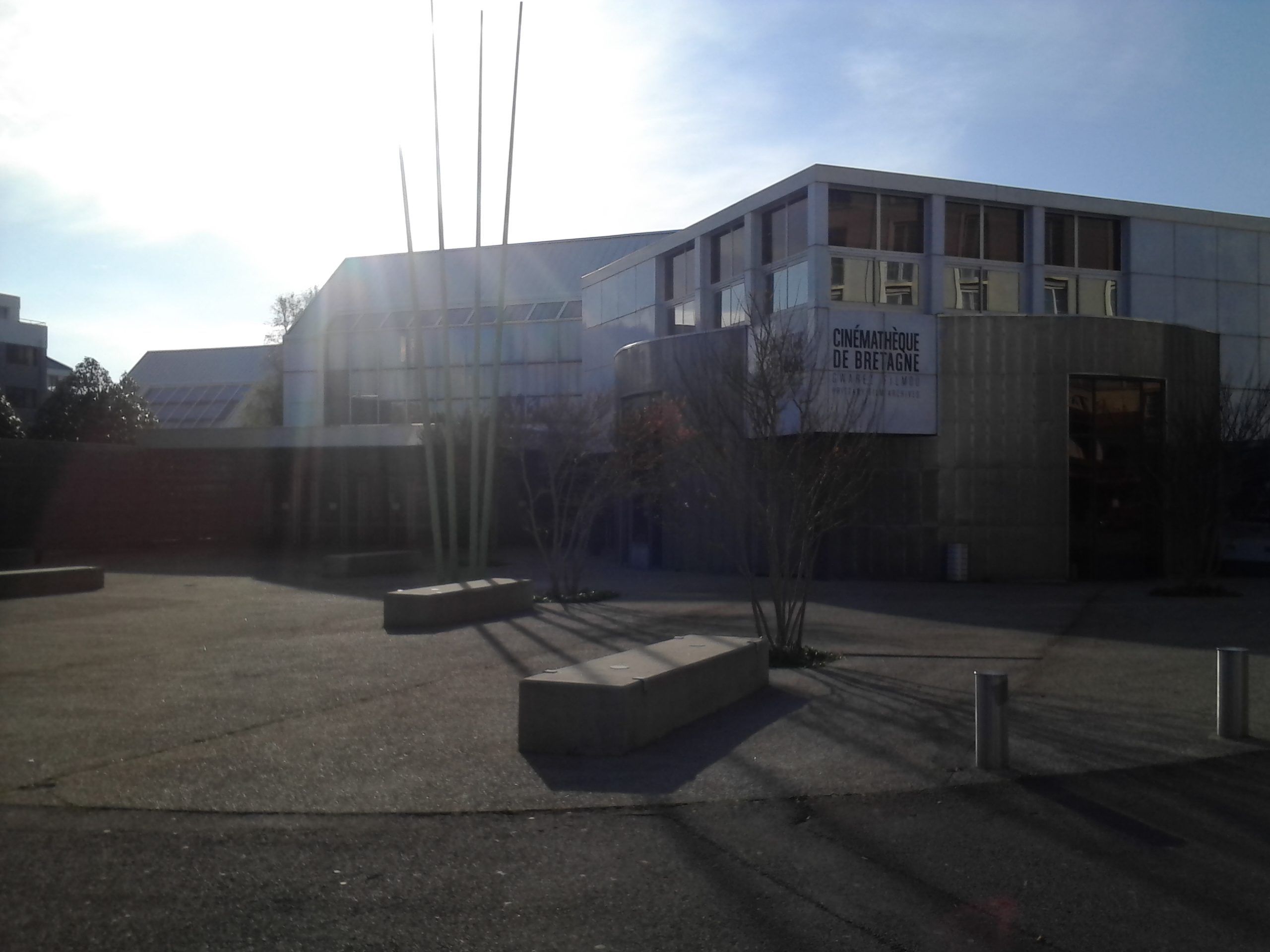
The Cinémathèque de Bretagne in 2016

The Cinémathèque de Bretagne (in Breton: Gwarez filmoù) is an associative film archive created in 1986 in Ploërmel by Mathilde Valverde and André Colleu, and headquartered in Brest, France. Its aim is to preserve and disseminate the Breton audiovisual heritage (which concerns Brittany or filmed by Bretons).

== Presentation ==
The Cinémathèque de Bretagne keeps 25 550 films, videos and soundtracks entrusted by 1 517 applicants, of which 6 546 are freely accessible online, 1 757 cinema devices, 8 177 photograms and digital photographs (available on subscription), 3 521 cinema magazines and more than 500 books. Its particularity is the collection of amateur films. This mission is carried out for the sake of sharing regional culture and not for commercial purposes. The collection contains several types of film format such as 35mm professional format, but also and above all amateur films, its true richness, such as 17.5mm, 16mm, 9.5mm, 8mm and super 8mm. Soundtracks such as smooth 6,25 or perforated tapes of all formats, associated with the film or not, are likewise collected. All types of video are registered such as 1 inch, 1/2 inch, 3/4 cassettes (U'matic, BVU ...), as well as Bétacam and Bétacam SP, VHS, SVHS, 8mm, HI 8mm, DV Cam knowing that the video medium has a limited lifespan of about 20 years. The Cinémathèque also keeps all types of material related to amateur cinema such as cameras, projectors, splicers, viewers, as well as all documentation relating to the subject. Its oldest available film dates from 1910

It publishes a newsletter, Le Fil à Fil, as well as an electronic newsletter "Entrefil".

== See also ==
- Cinematheque
- List of film archives
