= Qatar Digital Library =

Online library of Qatar heritage material

Coordinates: 25.31864°N 51.4415°E

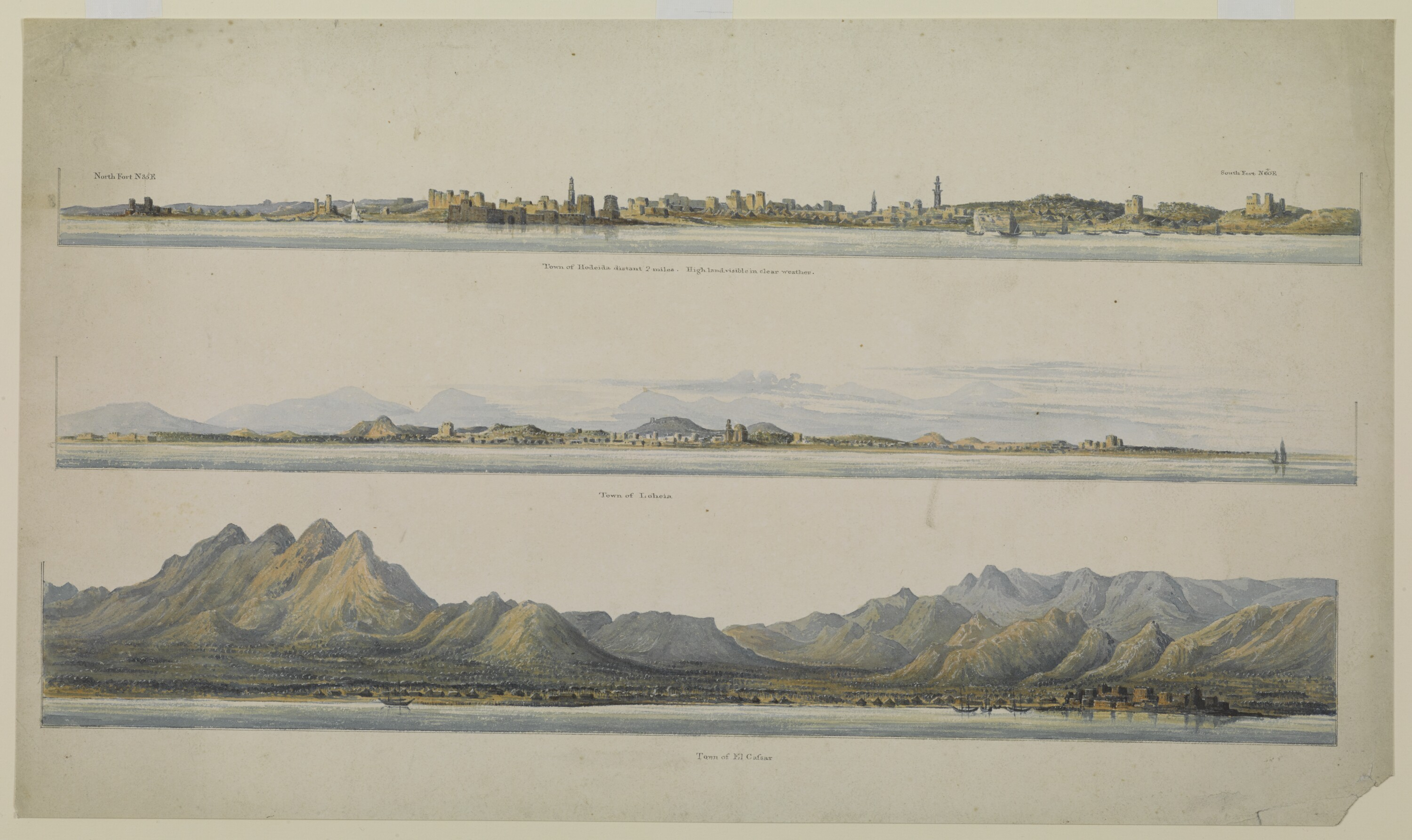
- A drawing of three coastal towns in Arabia by Thomas Elwon in the 1830s obtained from Qatar Digital Library.
- Location: Qatar
- Established: 2014

Collection
- Size: Over 2 million digitized pages

Other information
- Website: Qatar Digital Library

Qatar Digital Library (QDL) is a bilingual online library which was launched as a joint venture by a partnership consisting of Qatar Foundation, Qatar National Library and the British Library in October 2014. QDL comprises one of the largest online collections of historic records on the Persian Gulf countries.

== History ==
Qatar Digital Library was first announced in 2012. The starting budget was reported as £8.7 million. The partnership sought to digitize a rich trove of heritage material documenting Arab and Islamic history and to make it freely accessible to the public through the QDL, which was launched online in October 2014. The launch of the QDL's website marked the first phase of its launch. On 19 January 2015, the second phase of the QDL was commenced and is expected to last until December 2018. The second phase will witness the digitization of 1,125,000 pages of historical documents. In 2024, the QDL celebrated its 10th anniversary and reached almost 2.5 million digitised pages. In April 2025, the QDL and the Bibliothèque nationale de France signed a Memorandum of Understanding for digitisation, preservation and scholarly research of Islamic scientific manuscripts.

The website was designed and built by Cogapp. It has won multiple awards.

== Content ==
The digital library, with an English and Arabic bilingual interface, encompasses a total of 500,000 pages of items held by the British Library pertaining to the history of the Persian Gulf region. Some 475,000 pages, dating from the mid 18th century to 1951, are from the India Office Records and Private Papers (including the archives of the East India Company and its successor institutions); and 25,000 pages are of medieval and modern Arabic and English manuscripts. Among the pages are numerous photographs, maps, and drawings.

The British Library and QNL will both hold copies of the digital collection; however, after the completion of the digitization (originally estimated as the end of 2014), the QNL will assume responsibility for the hosting and further development of the QDL portal.

The British Library’s collection contains over 500 Arabic scientific manuscripts, of which 205 were digitalised in the first two phases of the project. The first phase included manuscripts from Ptolemy, Hippocrates, Aristotle, as well as Theodosius of Bithynia. The second phase was completed in July 2019 and consisted of 125 manuscripts.

As of 2021, 2 million pages of historical and cultural heritage materials were digitalized in the QDL. Since the QDL began in 2014 there were more than 1.9 million users registered worldwide.

== Similar projects ==
- Arabian Gulf Digital Archive – Digitized national archives of the United Arab Emirates
- Unlocking Our Sound Heritage – UK project for digitising project for audio archival material
- Unlocking Film Heritage – UK project for digitising audiovisual archival material
- Endangered Archives Programme - British Library programme for preserving cultural heritage
- Theatre Archive Project – for British theatre history
- World Digital Library – Library of Congress
