= Cinematheque de Saint-Etienne =

French public film organization

Coordinates: 45.4355°N 4.3802°E

Cinémathèque de Saint-Étienne
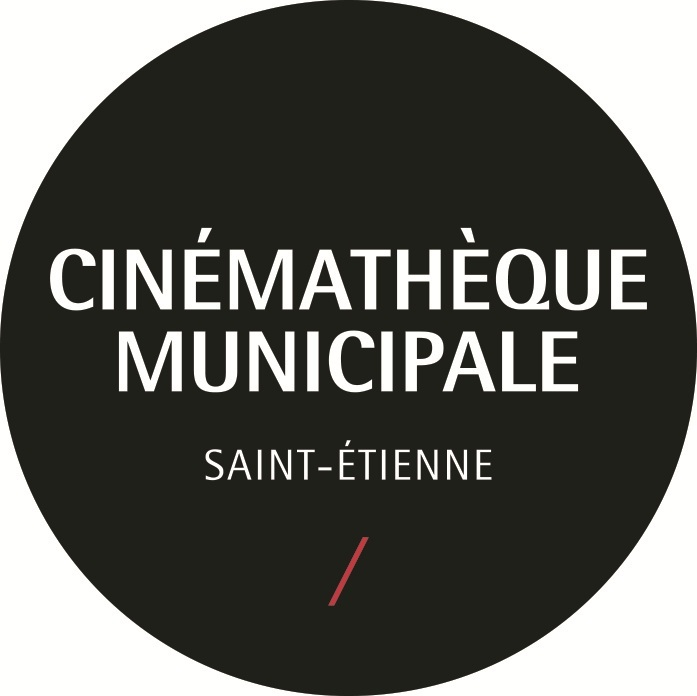
- Established: 1922
- Headquarters: 20–24 rue Jo Gouttebarge; 42001 Saint-Etienne cedex 1, France
- Location: Saint-Étienne, France
- Website: https://cinematheque.saint-etienne.fr/Default/accueil-portal.aspx

Content in this edit is translated from the existing French Wikipedia article at fr:Cinémathèque de Saint-Étienne; see its history for attribution.

The cinematheque of Saint-Etienne is a public film organization. It was created in 1922 under the name of the Office du Cinema Educateur (Office of Educational Film). Therefore, it holds many educational films. It has since gathered many amateur films and old movies. Since 1993, it is located inside the public library of Tarentaize in Saint-Etienne.

== Missions ==
The Cinematheque of Saint-Etienne aims at :

- Collecting, cataloging and curating

The cinematheque collects amateur movies, periodicals, documentation and film hardware technology. It owns more than 2800 books and 120 film periodicals dating back to 1924, more than 6000 official, commercial, amateur or educational films and videos. It also holds a collection of hardware, such as cameras or projectors.

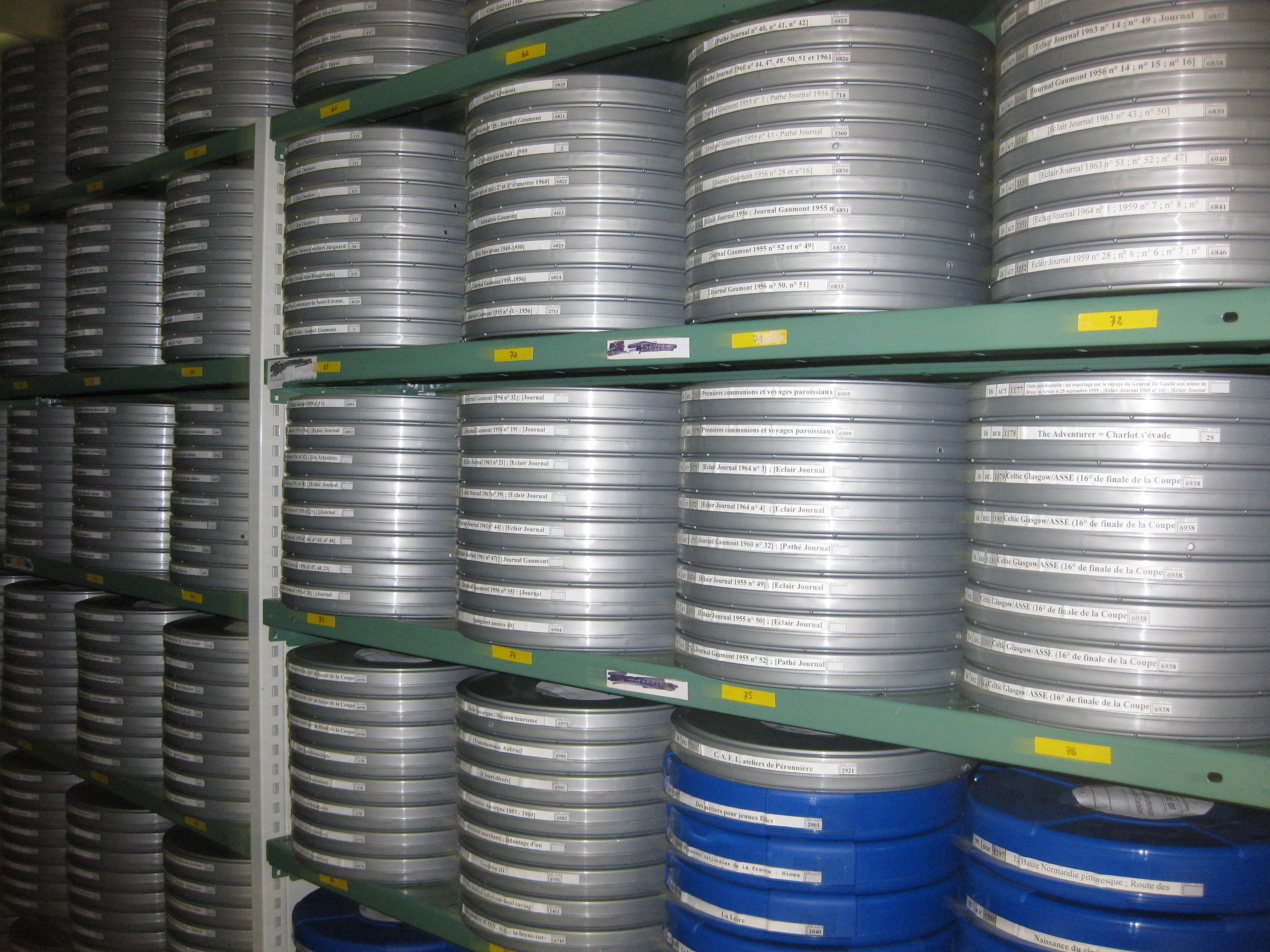
Film reels in the storage room of the Cinematheque.

- Showing films

The cinematheque shows two different types of films : films intended for children, either in class or not, and films intended for all audiences. It has a 110-seat theatre room (including four seats for handicapped people), a library and a place where people can see movies by themselves. Every screening is free and no reservation is required.(in French).

- Teaching

To promote cinephilia, the cinematheque organizes debates and conferences about film history. Some activities are aimed at children in order to teach them to look at films differently.

== History ==
- 1920 : Henry Maitte implemented an experimental service consisting in lending films and a professional film projector to elementary schools in the Loire department.
- July 1921 : The city council of Saint-Étienne decided to install an educational projector in every classroom of every primary school.
- 1922 : The Loire general council bought 30 educational films, from Pathé and Gaumont and created the Office of Educational Film, which would become the Cinematheque.
- 1924 : The Office had a collection of 98 educational films.
- 1926 : The film archives of Saint-Etienne were created. The Office acquired a 35mm film camera and shot its first film in the Office of Saint-Etienne.
- 1932 : All the French Offices of Educational Film joined the Ligue de l'Enseignement and created the UFOCEL (French Union of the Offices of Secular Educational Film).
- 1935 : The Office got equipped with the 36mm film format, both silent and with sound.
- 1937 : Educational film was from now on called « documentary film ». The collection of films belonging to the city separated from the one owned by the general council and took the name of Cinematheque of Saint-Etienne.
- 1939–1945 : The Cinematheque paused its activities during World War II.
- 1993 : The Cinematheque moved inside the central public library of Tarentaize.

== Collaborations ==
The Cinematheque works in collaboration with the theatre of Saint-Etienne and other cultural associations. For example, it shows many films in cooperation with associations who fight against racism, homophobia, sexism, violence against women and overall discrimination.
It participates in local festivals, such as Curieux Voyageurs, Regards sur la Culture d'Afrique, Face à Face or Ville en Partage and in national festivals, such as the Cinéma du Réel, Jean Rouch or the Clermont-Ferrand International Short Film Festival.

- Local festivals : « Curieux voyageurs », « Regards sur la culture d'Afrique », « Face à face », « Ville en partage ».
- National Festivals : « Cinéma du réel » by the Public Information Library in the Centre Georges Pompidou, « Jean Rouch » by the Musée de l'Homme in Paris, « Clermont-Ferrand International Short Film Festival ».

== Former Presidents ==
Eugène Reboul (1922–1937), M. Vicard (1936–1938), M. Cancade (1938–1947), M. Achard (1948), M. Folliet (1948–1955), M.Guilhot (1956–1962), M. Duprat (1963–1964), M. Thomas (1965–1969), M. Spagnol (1970–1974), M. Ayme (1974–1980), M. Vial (1981–2013), M. Léonard (since 2013).
