= London Television Archive =

Video archive

The London Television archive is a London-based television and film video archive.

It consists of thousands of hours of footage relating to London, from stock shots of famous landmarks such as Big Ben, Buckingham Palace and Westminster Abbey, to news stories such as Diana, Princess of Wales' death and state visits to London from dignitaries such as Bill Clinton and Nelson Mandela.

The main collection of the archive comes from the Channel One News Archive, which was active throughout the 1990s. Hence, The London Television Archive is particularly strong in cultural 1990 features such as the Brit Pop explosion, featuring Oasis and Blur, and the rise of Girl Power and the Spice Girls.

It also has a website that features art inspired by London, and an alternative tours of London page which features the most important London locations of The Beatles, The Rolling Stones, George Orwell and actors such as Alfred Hitchcock, Charlie Chaplin and Elizabeth Taylor.

The archive is predominantly used by film and television production companies, global television news networks, and advertising agencies.

As of late 2020, the archive "clip" sales now appear to be handled by Kinolibrary, (https://kinolibrary.com/) although uncredited to the London Television Archive, or Channel One News.

== Collection ==
=== Royalty ===
- Elizabeth II
- Prince Philip, Duke of Edinburgh
- Queen Elizabeth the Queen Mother
- Charles III
- Queen Camilla
- Diana, Princess of Wales
- The Prince of Wales
- The Duke of Sussex
- The Princess Margaret, Countess of Snowdon
- The Princess Royal
- Andrew Mountbatten-Windsor
- The Duke of Edinburgh

=== Politicians ===
- Nelson Mandela
- Tony Blair
- Margaret Thatcher
- Jacques Chirac
- George W. Bush
- Gordon Brown
- Tessa Jowell
- Ken Livingstone
- Menzies Campbell

=== Film stars ===
- George Clooney
- Tom Cruise
- Nicole Kidman
- Arnold Schwarzenegger
- Uma Thurman
- Leonardo DiCaprio
- Sylvester Stallone
- Antonio Banderas
- Teri Hatcher

=== Music stars ===
- Michael Jackson
- Madonna
- Sting
- George Michael
- Björk
- Robbie Williams
- U2/Bono, Radiohead
- R.E.M.
- Spice Girls
- Blur
- Oasis
- Van Morrison

=== Sports stars ===
- David Beckham
- Joe Calzaghe
- Michael Schumacher
- Tiger Woods
- Andre Agassi
- Tim Henman
- George Best
