= Herzliya Cinematheque =

The Herzliya Cinematheque is a movie theater in Herzliya located on Ben Gurion Street 22 (entry from Habaal Shem Tov garden). In September 2008, the Cinematheque reopened, after two of the three original halls of the former Star Cinema complex were renovated, and since then films have been screened in two screening rooms, including 275 seats.

In 2009, a third hall with about 60 seats was opened.

The complex hosted theme nights, lectures and performances, and even screened films.

The Cinematheque hosts creators from the Israeli and international film industries and held regular screenings hosted by film critics, actors, academics and filmmakers. It also hosted short festivals that focused on different cultures: such as Indian cinema (in collaboration with the Indian Embassy in Israel), and Japanese (in collaboration with the Israel-Japan Friendship Association).

In November 2023, the Cinematheque moved to its new home in the Herzliya Municipality Building. The location has three state-of-the-art halls, equipped to the highest standard. The large hall seats about 200, the medium hall seats about 60, and the small hall, which is adapted for screenings for private events, seats about 30.
