= CineFiles =

Digitized film document collection

CineFiles is a database of digitized film documents, containing more than 50,000 documents on film history, compiled at the Berkeley Art Museum and Pacific Film Archive, at the University of California, Berkeley, and supported by the Museum Informatics Project. Types of documents available on CineFiles include newspaper clippings, film reviews, interviews, popular and scholarly articles, publicity materials, program notes, book excerpts, pamphlets, filmmakers' texts and correspondence, and many other rare archival documents dating from the early 1900s to the present.

Citations are available for all documents, and page images are available for documents with copyright clearance. Page images or links are freely available for over 90% of the documents. In some cases access to documents is restricted to users with a UC Berkeley on-campus IP address. More about this topic can be found on the Copyright Resources Project webpage. CineFiles currently includes documents on the films of more than 150 major international directors, materials describing silent Soviet cinema, and PFA's unique collection of exhibitor manuals, among other documents. New titles and document images are continue to be added.

== History ==
CineFiles database was created in 1994 and expanded in 1996 with support from the National Endowment for the Humanities to allow the Pacific Film Archive Library and Film Study Center to index and digitize materials from its documentation collection and make them freely available, with copyright holders' permissions, on the Internet. In 2006, a three-year grant from Institute of Museum and Library Services (IMLS) to expand the scope of CineFiles. Other supporters include the Library Services and Technology Act, the Packard Humanities Institute, and individual donors.

The website was redesigned in 2009.
