= Endangered Archives Programme =

Funding programme and digital archive run by the British Library

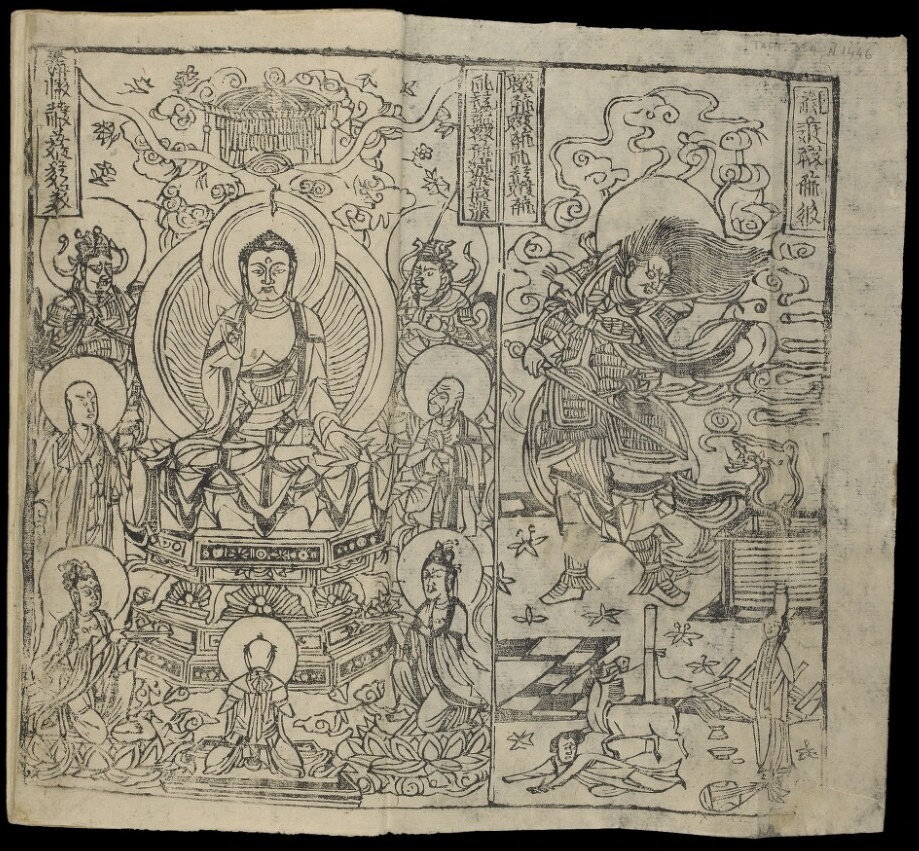
Tangut Buddhist text digitized under EAP140 Preservation through digitisation of the Tangut collection at the Institute of Oriental Studies, St Petersburg Branch, Russian Academy of Sciences

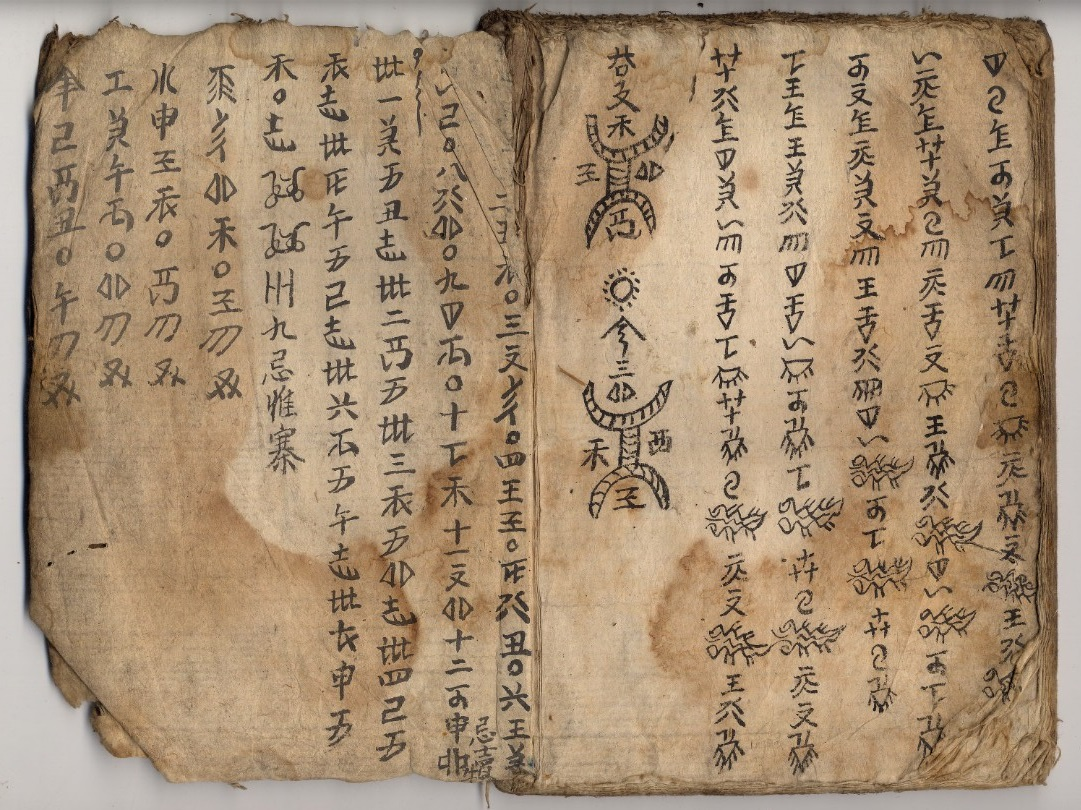
Shuishu manuscript digitized under EAP143-1 Shui Manuscript Collection at the Libo Archives, Guizhou, China [16th - 20th Century]

The Endangered Archives Programme (EAP) is a funding programme and digital archive run by the British Library in London. It has the purpose of preserving cultural heritage where resources may be limited. Each year EAP awards grants to researchers to identify and preserve culturally important archives by digitising them in situ. The original archival material does not leave the country of origin, and projects often incorporate local training and career development. EAP focuses on material created before the mid twentieth century.

Related programmes also sponsored by Arcadia include the Endangered Languages Documentation Project at the Berlin-Brandenburg Academy, the Endangered Knowledge Documentation Programme at the British Museum, the Modern Endangered Archives Program at University of California, Los Angeles, and the Endangered Wooden Architecture Programme at Oxford Brookes University.

== Projects ==
As of 2019 EAP had funded over 400 projects. Some of these have received media coverage, including projects on manuscripts containing magical texts from Djenne, Mali, and the Islamic libraries of Timbuktu, Mali, which are under threat of destruction by war, collections of palm-leaf manuscripts from Sri Lanka, and archives from Brazil.

== Digital collections ==
The digital collections of the Endangered Archives Programme comprise over 7 million images and 25,000 sound files. The digital material includes manuscripts, printed books, archival documents, photographs, and early sound recordings. The original material and digital files remain in the country of origin, copies being made available to researchers on the EAP website. EAP collections come from Africa, Asia, the Americas and the Caribbean, Russia and Eastern Europe.

== History ==
Since 2004, the Endangered Archives Programme has been administered by the British Library with the financial support of the Arcadia Fund. The Programme was initially based within the Asia, Pacific and Africa Collections (APAC) of the British Library and had two full-time members of staff, with the directorship being the responsibility of the head of APAC. In 2011, EAP moved to the newly formed Digital Scholarship section of the British Library. Previous directors include Graham Shaw, Susan Whitfield, Aly Conteh and Adam Farquhar. In 2018, a second phase of the Programme began with a further grant from Arcadia when EAP moved to the Collections and Curation department of the British Library. Sam van Schaik was appointed the first head of EAP in February 2019.

== Similar projects ==
- Unlocking Our Sound Heritage – UK project for digitising project for audio archival material
- Unlocking Film Heritage – UK project for digitising audiovisual archival material
- Theatre Archive Project – for British theatre history
- Qatar Digital Library
