= National Air and Space Museum Film Archive =

The National Air and Space Museum Film Archives, part of the Archives Division at the National Air and Space Museum, Smithsonian Institution, holds over 20,000 films documenting the history of aviation and space flight.

The Film Archives is located at the Steven F. Udvar-Hazy Center in Chantilly, Virginia, where it moved in 2011 from its previous location in the National Air and Space Museum (NASM) building on the National Mall. The collections are available for research, though requests must be made in advance.

NASM Film Archives' collections range from the early days of flight to space exploration. Totaling more than 700,000 feet of motion picture film as well as videotape, the collections include edited documentaries, instructional films, promotional films, home movies, interviews and outtakes. The earliest item in the collection is a 1909 test flight of the Wright Military Flyers at Ft. Myer, Virginia.

The collections include:

- Keystone Aircraft Corporation Collection (1926–34)
- Seymour Collection (1926–34)
- Lewis E. Reisner Collection (1929–38)
- World Trip Collection (1935–36)
- We Saw It Happen (1953)
