= Moving Image Archive =

Collection of Scottish film and video recordings

The Moving Image Archive is a collection of Scottish film and video recordings at the National Library of Scotland, held at Kelvin Hall in Glasgow, Scotland. There are over 46,000 items within the collection, and over 2,600 of these are publicly available online at the library's Moving Image Catalogue.

== History ==
The Scottish Film Archive was established by the Scottish Film Council in 1976 with the aid of the Government's Job Creation Scheme and became a permanent feature of the council's activities in 1978.

What was to become the Moving Image Archive came to the National Library of Scotland in 2007, though it was called the Scottish Screen Archive at the time. Scottish Screen was established in 1997 and worked in the areas of production, development, location assistance, exhibition and festivals, training, media education and preserving the heritage and history of the moving image; developing, encouraging and promoting every aspect of film, television and new media in Scotland. Working with the Scottish Government, their goal was to establish Scotland as a major screen production centre and project Scottish culture to the world.

It was announced in January 2006 that Scottish Screen would amalgamate with Scottish Arts Council to form the newly created Creative Scotland. Creative Scotland took over these functions in 2010. The NLS renamed the collection in 2015.

== Moving Image Archive ==
The main purpose of the National Library of Scotland's Moving Image Archive is to locate, preserve and provide access to moving images reflecting Scottish 20th and 21st century culture and history. In addition the Archive collects a wide range of written and photographic materials relating to the development of cinema exhibition and film production in Scotland over the past 100 years. The Archive was originally premised in Hillington with limited facilities, however it relocated in 2016 to the Library's new public centre for digital and moving image collections at Glasgow's Kelvin Hall.

Principally non-fiction, the Archive's collection to date includes more than 46,000 items comprising documentary, newsreel, shorts, educational, advertising and promotional films, amateur and professional productions. The material is largely on 16mm and 35mm, with smaller collections of 9.5mm and 8mm film and videotape. The collection has been built up largely through donations from all sectors of the community, industry, broadcasting organisations, local authorities and members of the public, with a nucleus of material acquired from the former Scottish Central Film Library and Films of Scotland Committee.

The strengths of the collection lie in its ability to illustrate local community life, industrial history and the changing nature of leisure. It reflects ways in which Scotland and its people have been portrayed in film since 1896, both by indigenous and visiting filmmakers and more recently the broadcasting sector and the Scottish film industry.

The television material in the Archive includes Gaelic language broadcast production from 1993 onwards, the acquisition of which is funded by Seirbheis nam Meadhanan Gaidhlig (GMS).

Preservation is the primary function of the archive. Purpose-built film and video vaults ensure that original masters are correctly stored and protected.

The Archive is a member of The International Federation of Film Archives (FIAF), the International Federation of Television Archives (FIAT), and is a founding member of the UK Film Archive Forum. The Archive is also a participating member of the Scottish Archive Network (SCAN).

== See also ==
- Northern Ireland Screen
- UK Film Council
