= North West Film Archive =

Institution in Manchester, England

- Interactive map of North West Film Archive
- 53.478094011118024°N 2.2443121941045017°W
- Location: Manchester, England
- Established: 1977
- Website: https://www.mmu.ac.uk/north-west-film-archive

The North West Film Archive (NWFA, established 1977) in Manchester, is a moving image collection for the North West of England.

The archive cares for 35,000 items ranging in date from the pioneer days of film in the mid-1890s to video productions of the present day. The work of both the professional and the amateur is collected. The NWFA is a part of the Learning and Research Information Services (library) at Manchester Metropolitan University and is located in Archives+ at Manchester Central Library.

== History ==
The North West Film Archive is Britain's largest public film collection outside London. The archive was set up in 1977 and is the home for moving images made in or about Greater Manchester, Lancashire, Cheshire, Merseyside and Cumbria. The region's position at the forefront of industrialisation is reflected in the archive's collection.

The archive works with colleagues in national and regional film archives throughout the country. In 1994 the NWFA became a member of the International Federation of Film Archives (FIAF) and the archive is also a member of the Film Archive Forum.

In 2020, in response to the COVID-19 pandemic, the archive launched #Lockdownlife Appeal to help collect materials during and about the pandemic in the North West of England.

== Archives ==
Collections

The NWFA collections include; cinema newsreels, documentaries, advertising and promotional information, education and travel films, home videos, corporate videos and regional television programmes. Collections of photographs, taped interviews and original documentation have also been established. The material relates to the Archive's moving image collection and also to the region's film and cinema industries.

Access

The archive offers access services to users in the public, academic and commercial sectors. Local residents and groups can take advantage of the NWFA's free research, viewing and loan services. Those in higher education can make use of the archives as the collections support academic teaching and research. The NWFA has over twenty years' experience in providing a commercial service to television companies both in the UK and abroad.

Public screenings and projects

The NWFA do public screenings at venues in the region and participated in the national digitising project Unlocking Film Heritage.
