= East Anglian Film Archive =

English historical film archive

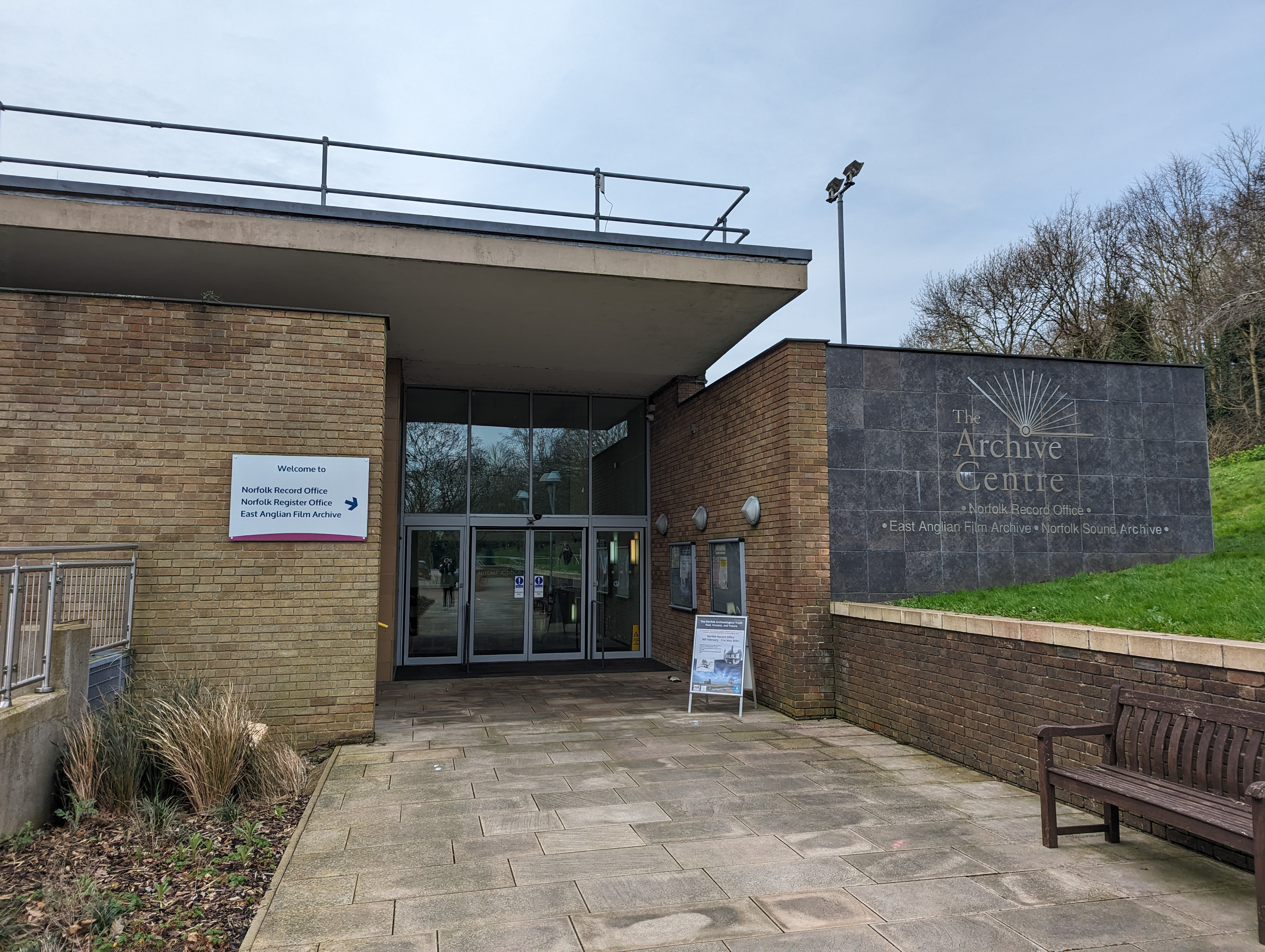
- The entrance to The Archive Centre, which contains the EAFA
- Location: The Archive Centre, Martineau Lane, Norwich NR1 2DQ, Norwich, United Kingdom
- Type: Film archives
- Established: 1976
- Affiliation: University of East Anglia
- Period covered: 1896-present

Building information
- Building: The Archive Centre
- Website: eafa.org.uk

The East Anglian Film Archive (EAFA) is a specialist archive of filmed heritage, and it is the regional film archive for the East of England. It collects and preserves film and videotape primarily from the Eastern counties of Bedfordshire, Cambridgeshire, Essex, Hertfordshire, Norfolk and Suffolk.

== History ==
The Archive was founded in 1976 by David Cleveland, who was Archivist until 2004. The Archive is contained in a purpose-built building in the Norfolk Archive Centre at County Hall, Norwich. The collection has been owned and managed by the University of East Anglia since 1984.

== The collection ==
The collection holds nationally and internationally important collections of film and video dating from 1896. The collections include videotapes and reels from BBC East and ITV Anglia. The Archive also holds the film library of the Institute of Amateur Cinematographers. This collection contains films from the Institute's regional or international competitions, as well as films submitted as part of sponsored competitions from newspapers such as the Daily Mail. The collection includes a nationally important collection of 142 films made by women filmmakers from 1920s to the 1980s.

== Projects within the EAFA ==
The EAFA has engaged in projects that help to highlight different aspects of its collection. Invisible Innovators: Making Women Filmmakers Visible Across The UK Film Archives, is a project that was commissioned by Film Archives UK 'to explore the current scale and scope of the holdings of women's amateur filmmaking within the regional and national film and media archives.'
