= Screen and Sound Archive =

The Screen and Sound Archive of the National Library of Wales was established in 2001 in order to preserve and promote the audio-visual heritage of Wales. The archive is located at the National Library of Wales in Aberystwyth. The archive holds a collection of 5.5 million feet of film that represents Welsh culture and life in Wales from the late 19th century through to the 21st century.

The Archive puts on screenings of its collections.

== Projects ==
- Unlocking Film Heritage - Between 2013 and 2017 over 700 titles were made available free online during the project.
- Unlocking Our Sound Heritage.
- National Broadcast Archive for Wales - In 2019 the National Library of Wales secured funding to develop a National Broadcast Archive alongside its Screen and Sound archive. The Archive will feature the Archives of BBC Cymru Wales which include 95,000 audio tapes and 64,000 video tapes dating from 1923.
