= North East Film Archive =

British organisation and moving image archive

The North East Film Archive (NEFA) is a not-for-profit organisation which exists to collect, preserve and provide access to film, television and other moving image material, across Durham, Cumbria, Northumberland, Tyne and Wear and the Tees Valley.

In July 2012 the archive, originally known as the Northern Region Film and Television Archive merged with the Yorkshire Film Archive.

== History and overview ==
The NEFA was founded in January 1998 as an unofficial consortium of four bodies which already held substantial film and television collections within the region: what was then the University of Teesside (now Teesside University), Tyne and Wear Archives Service (TWAS, the county record office for Tyne and Wear), Trade Films and Cumbria Archives Service (the county record office for Cumbria).

Initial funding was provided by Northern Arts (what was then the UK Government's regional agency for distributing public arts funding in the north-east of England), and the organisation began life with a full-time curator and a part-time archivist. In 2001, responsibility for distributing core funding to the English regional film archives passed from Northern Arts to the newly formed UK Film Council's regional agency, Northern Film and Media.

A temperature and humidity controlled vault facility was built for the NEFA on the Teesside campus during 2003, and was formally opened the following year. In December 2003, NRFTA Ltd was formed as a company limited by guarantee, making the archive an independent legal entity.

In February 2006, responsibility for providing a moving image archive service to Cumbria passed from the NRFTA to the North West Film Archive. As of February 2010 the NEFA had a staff of two (one full-time and one part-time), both based at Teesside University.

The NEFA is one of a network of eight regional film archives in England. It is an 'emerging archive' member institution of the UK Film Archive Forum.

In July 2012, NEFA merged with the Yorkshire Film Archive (YFA). The combined collection currently contains over 50,000 titles – 17,000 held by YFA, and 33,000 held by NEFA – ranging from films of the late 1890s, to recent footage of changing landscapes and life across both regions.

== Current operations ==
The NEFA is based at Teesside University in Middlesbrough, where most of the collection is stored. Limited storage facilities are also operated at Tyne and Wear Archives Service in Newcastle upon Tyne as well, but all work on the collection now takes place at Teesside. Viewing facilities for members of the public are available at Newcastle, but preservation and cataloguing work no longer takes place there. As with any archive, the NEFA undertakes three core activities.

- Acquisition. There is no system of legal deposit for audiovisual media in the UK, and so moving image archives have to identify appropriate materials for preservation and persuade their owners to deposit them.
- Preservation. Film, magnetic tape and digital optical media are among the most technically complex of any archival medium to preserve for the long-term. NEFA staff carry out this task through a combination of preserving original media and copying where this is necessary to prevent the loss of content.
- Access. This includes dealing with viewing requests from individual researchers, organising public screenings and licensing material to film and TV programme makers, and for online use. Access work can also involve negotiating copyright clearance and overcoming technical issues needed to provide high-quality access copies.

The NEFA is funded from a combination of sources, including public money, revenue from commercial footage licensing to broadcasters (all other paid-for services are charged on a cost-covering basis) and 'in kind' contributions from its constituent organisations, principally Teesside University and Tyne and Wear Archives Service. The NEFA's work is overseen by a board of directors, and its permanent staff are all employees of Teesside University.

== The collection ==
The collection policies of the English regional film archives are all broadly similar. They do not collect fictional feature films or TV programmes produced outside their regions and/or intended for network broadcast: this is the responsibility of the National Film and Television Archive. The NEFA's collection consists mainly of regional TV news and regionally produced network output, industrial, promotional, educational and advertising films, and amateur film and video. Among its major collections are:

- BBC regional news filmed location reports for the north-east and Cumbria, covering 1957–1991.
- News, drama and documentary material produced by Tyne Tees Television, from 1956 to the mid-1990s.
- The complete output of Turners, a Newcastle-based production unit which made industrial and educational films from 1947–1995.
- The complete output of Trade Films, a Newcastle-based production unit which made campaigning films and videos for the trade union movement between the mid-1970s and the mid-1990s.
- The film and video collection of Imperial Chemical Industries (ICI), produced by its corporate production unit based at the chemical works in Billingham, covering 1935–1992.
- A collection of training and public information films made by the Durham Police Constabulary.
- A collection of amateur film and video dating from 1928 to the present day.

== Curators ==
- January 1998 to December 2000: Chris Galloway
- December 2000 to 27 May 2001: Position vacant
- 28 May 2001 to 18 November 2006: Leo Enticknap
- From 19 November 2006 to November 2008: Position vacant
- November 2008 to November 2009: Stephen McIntyre
