= EUscreen =

- Website type: Digital library
- Founded: October 2009
- Website: EUscreen.eu
- Launched: October 27, 2011

EUscreen is a website that provides free access to a part of Europe's television heritage through videos, articles, images and audio from European audiovisual archives and broadcasters. Its digitised content covers a period from early 1900 until today. EUscreen "aligns the heterogeneous collections held throughout Europe and encourages the exploration of Europe's cultural and television history by different user groups". EUscreen is also the name of the overarching network of institutions working on providing access European audiovisual collections.

The EUscreen project and the EUscreen network leaps the gap between people that wish to see old television materials (be it for leisure, for reuse or for education/research) and television archives. Although audiovisual content is in the process of being digitised and made available online in most European countries, access to television archives, remains scattered. This is partly due to digitisation technologies and practices not advancing at the same pace in all European countries but also due to rights legislation.

== History ==
EUscreen is a three-year project that started in October 2009. Within the duration of the project, over 41,000 items that capture Europe's television heritage are made available online through a multilingual and freely accessible portal that was launched on the World Day of Audiovisual Heritage in 2011. In 2012, the Virtual Exhibitions were added to the portal. The project group, a gathering of technology partners, researchers and European public broadcasters, emerged from earlier European projects: Video Active and Birth of Television. The network where the participants to these projects got to know each other, was the International Federation of Television Archives (FIAT/IFTA). In this network also the European research projects around audiovisual preservation named 'Presto' (PrestoSpace, PrestoPrime, Presto4U) had been initiated. In the EUscreen project, the focus lies on exploring Europe's cultural and television heritage via various digitised sources such as audiovisual material, articles, photographs and audio. In 2012, funding was granted by the European Commission for the three-year EUscreenXL project, the successor to EUscreen.

== Metadata ==
To align the information from the different archives and databases, EUscreen has adopted a standard metadata model in the broadcasting domain: the EBUCore Set of Metadata, released by the EBU metadata working group at the end of 2008. This metadata model has been mapped to the European Data Model (EDM). EDM is an advanced version of the Europeana Semantic Elements. EDM is a model that is more open, flexible, and able to follow the paradigms of the semantic web because it is not bound to a specific domain and can therefore be easily implemented in different contexts.

EUscreen is directly connected to Europeana, the online gateway to millions of digitised items like books, paintings and archival records from European archives, museums and libraries.

== Content Selection Policy ==
Most of the content on EUscreen has been selected using a list of historical topics that may offer an insight into the cultural, economic, social and political developments and events that took place in Europe in the second half of the twentieth century. Apart from using the predefined list, content providers also uploaded material that reflected their own strengths and interests.

However, European broadcasters didn’t all start broadcasting on the same day and archiving policies as well as recording technologies have influenced the amount and type of items that have been preserved. Therefore, the EUscreen partners have uploaded a substantially varied collection to the portal.

== Financing and organisation ==
The EUscreen project is funded by the European Commission under eContentplus, the Information and Communication Technologies Policy Support Programme (ICT PSP). Moreover, EUscreen's partners also contribute to the financing of the project. In September 2013, the EUscreen Foundation was registered as a non-profit foundation under Dutch law.

The EUscreen consortium is coordinated by Utrecht University, and consists of the following partners:

Archives	Technology Providers	Research Organisations	Associate Partners
Cinecittà Luce	Europeana Foundation	Aalto University School of Arts, Design and Architecture	BBC
Czech Television	European Broadcasting Union	ATiT	FIAT/IFTA
Danish Broadcasting Corporation	National Technical University of Athens	British Universities Film & Video Council	AthenaWeb
Deutsche Welle	Noterik	Eötvös Loránd University	AAMOD
Hellenic National Audiovisual Archive	–	Maastricht University	Politecnico di Torino
Institut National de l'Audiovisuel	–	Royal Holloway, University of London	Audiovisual Library of the EC
National Library of Sweden	–	Utrecht University	DIVERSE
NAVA	–	–	MEMORIAV
Netherlands Institute for Sound and Vision	–	–	Ellinikí Radiofonía Tileórasi
Österreichischer Rundfunk	–	–	National Library of Norway
Radiotelevisione Italiana	–	–	–
Radio Télévision Belge Francophone	–	–	–
Raidió Teilifís Éireann	–	–	–
Radiotelevizija Slovenija	–	–	–
Televisió de Catalunya	–	–	–
Telewizja Polska	–	–	–
Televiziunea Română	–	–	–

== See also ==
- Cultural heritage
- Digital preservation
- Europeana
- Film preservation
- History of television
- International Association of Sound and Audiovisual Archives
- Public broadcasting
- Television
