= International Association of Sound and Audiovisual Archives =

International archive organization

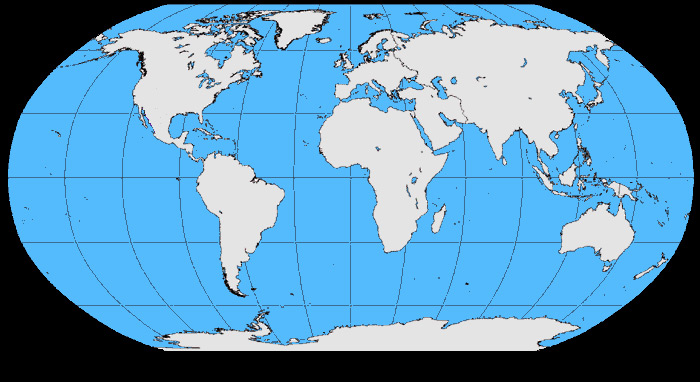
- zone of influence
- Abbreviation: IASA
- Formation: 1969
- Purpose: Professional Body
- Region served: Worldwide
- Members: 420
- Official language: English, French, German, Spanish
- President: Tre Berney
- Affiliations: Co-ordinating Council of Audiovisual Archives Associations
- Website: Association of Sound and Audiovisual Archives

The International Association of Sound and Audiovisual Archives (IASA) was established in 1969 to serve as a forum for international co-operation between archives, libraries, and individuals interested in the preservation of recorded sound and audiovisual documents.

== IASA aims ==
The IASA constitution states the following purposes:

- To strengthen co-operation between archives and other institutions which preserve sound and audiovisual documents.
- To initiate and encourage activities that develop and improve the organisation, administration and contents of recorded sound and audiovisual collections, and, in pursuance of these aims, to co-operate with other organisations in related fields.
- To study all techniques relevant to the work of sound and audiovisual archives and other institutions which preserve these documents and to disseminate the results of such study on an international scale.
- To encourage, on an international level, the exchange of sound and audiovisual documents and of literature and information relating to these documents.
- To stimulate and further by every means the preservation, documentation and dissemination of all recorded sound and audiovisual collections.

== Membership ==
IASA has members from more than 70 countries representing a broad palette of audiovisual archives and personal interests which are distinguished by their focus on particular subjects and areas, for example: archives for all sorts of musical recordings, historic, literary, folkloric and ethnological sound documents, theatre productions and oral history interviews, bio-acoustics, environmental and medical sounds, linguistic and dialect recordings, as well as recordings for forensic purposes.

== IASA activities ==
IASA promotes the open and ongoing exchange of ideas and information on current issues in the audiovisual field via annual conferences, an IASA Journal, email list and the IASA web site.

== Annual conferences ==
IASA has held a conference each year since its inception, sometimes in partnership with related organisations. In 2010, IASA and the Association of Moving Image Archivists (AMIA) came together for the first time in a joint IASA-AMIA conference held in Philadelphia, USA. With more than 750 participants and more than 100 presentations and lectures this was one of the biggest conferences in the audiovisual archiving field ever. The 2013 conference in Vilnius, Lithuania, was held in association with the Baltic Audiovisual Archival Council. The 2019 conference was held in Amsterdam, Netherlands.

Annual conferences in Europe
Annual conferences in Africa, Asia and Australasia
Annual conferences in North America

| Year | Host country | Co-organiser |
|---|---|---|
| 1969 | Amsterdam, Netherlands | |
| 1970 | Leipzig, German Democratic Republic | with IAML |
| 1971 | St Gallen, Switzerland | with IAML |
| 1972 | Bologna, Italy | with IAML |
| 1973 | London, United Kingdom | with IAML |
| 1974 | Jerusalem, Israel | with IAML |
| 1975 | Montreal, Canada | with IAML |
| 1976 | Bergen, Norway | with IAML |
| 1977 | Mainz, Federal Republic of Germany | with IAML |
| 1978 | Lisbon, Portugal | with IAML |
| 1979 | Salzburg, Austria | with IAML |
| 1980 | Cambridge, United Kingdom | with IAML |
| 1981 | Budapest, Hungary | with IAML |
| 1982 | Brussels, Belgium | with IAML |
| 1983 | Washington DC, United States | with IAML |
| 1984 | Como, Italy | with IAML |
| 1985 | East Berlin, German Democratic Republic | with IAML |
| 1986 | Stockholm, Sweden | with IAML |
| 1987 | Amsterdam, Netherlands | with IAML |
| 1988 | Vienna, Austria | First IASA solo conference |
| 1989 | Oxford, United Kingdom | with IAML |
| 1990 | Ottawa, Canada | with ARSC & Canadian Association of Music Libraries |
| 1991 | Sopron, Hungary | |
| 1992 | Canberra, Australia | with ASRA |
| 1993 | Helsinki, Finland | with IAML |
| 1994 | Berlin, Germany | with FIAT/IFTA |
| 1995 | Washington DC, United States | with FIAT/IFTA & ARSC |
| 1996 | Perugia, Italy | with IAML |
| 1997 | Muscat, Sultanate of Oman | |
| 1998 | Paris, France | with AFAS |
| 1999 | Vienna, Austria | Arbeitsgemeinschaft audiovisueller Archive Österreichs |
| 2000 | Singapore | National Archives of Singapore, with Southeast Asia-Pacific Audio Visual Archives Association (SEAPAVAA) |
| 2001 | London, United Kingdom | The British Library |
| 2002 | Arhus, Denmark | Statsbibioteket - State and University Library, Denmark |
| 2003 | Pretoria, South Africa | |
| 2004 | Oslo, Norway | with IAML |
| 2005 | Barcelona, Spain | |
| 2006 | Mexico City, Mexico | |
| 2007 | Riga, Latvia | Latvian Television, Baltic Audiovisual Archival Council |
| 2008 | Sydney, Australia | Australian National Maritime Museum |
| 2009 | Athens, Greece | Hellenic National Audiovisual Archive |
| 2010 | Philadelphia, United States | with Association of Moving Image Archivists |
| 2011 | Frankfurt, Germany | German National Library; Hessischer Rundfunk; German Broadcasting Archive |
| 2012 | New Delhi, India | AIIS Archives and Research Center for Ethnomusicology |
| 2013 | Vilnius, Lithuania | Vilnius University, Baltic Audiovisual Archival Council |
| 2014 | Cape Town, South Africa | National Library of South Africa's Center for the Book |
| 2015 | Paris, France | Bibliothèque nationale de France |
| 2016 | Washington DC, United States | Library of Congress |
| 2017 | Berlin | Ethnological Museum |
| 2018 | Accra, Ghana | Institute of African Studies, University of Ghana |
| 2019 | Hilversum, Netherlands | Netherlands Institute for Sound and Vision |
| 2020 | Dublin, Trinity College Dublin, Ireland | with International Federation of Television Archives, Raidió Teilifís Éireann. In light of the COVID-19 pandemic and the uncertainties it brings, the Organising committee has made the decision to host a virtual conference instead of a physical meeting. |
| 2021 | Virtual conference, | |
| 2022 | Mexico City, Mexico, | Fonoteca Nacional |

== Publications ==
IASA follows closely the progress of technology and members can call upon a pool of expertise for help and advice on various aspects, ranging from digitisation to metadata to technical issues. In this regard, IASA has published a number of special publications:

- The Safeguarding of the Audio Heritage: Ethics, Principles and Preservation Strategy (IASA-TC 03)
- Guidelines on the Production and Preservation of Digital Audio Objects (IASA-TC 04)
- Handling and Storage of Audio and Video Carriers (IASA-TC 05)
- Guidelines for the Preservation of Video Recordings (IASA-TC 06)
- IASA Cataloguing Rules (also a Spanish version as Reglas de Catalogación de IASA)
- Task Force on Selection for Digital Transfer.
- Ethical Principles for Sound and Audiovisual Archives

== Awards and grants ==
The organisation issues awards for outstanding contributions to the profession of sound and audiovisual archiving, as well as financial support for research, for training, and for participating in annual conferences:

- Since 2004 the IASA Award of Recognition for outstanding service has been awarded each year to an IASA member
- The status of Honorary Member of IASA is awarded to individuals as a mark of special service in the work of sound and audiovisual archives
- Travel Awards are awarded annually to selected IASA members to offset the costs of active participation in an annual conference.
- Research Grants are awarded on an occasional basis to support original research and publication on audiovisual archiving.
- The Dietrich Schüller Award for Audiovisual Training supports attendance at training courses.

== Collaboration ==
IASA has long standing relationships with international organisations such as UNESCO and Europeana and is a respected partner in various international audiovisual archive projects. IASA is a founding member of the CCAAA (Co-ordinating Council of Audiovisual Archive Associations).

In 2012 and 2013, IASA hosted the official website of the UNESCO World Day for Audiovisual Heritage, an event held annually on 27 October to raise awareness of the significance of and threats to sound and moving image heritage worldwide.

== Executive Board and President ==
=== Executive Board ===
Term of office from 2020 to 2023:

- President: Tre Berney, Director of Digitization and Conservation, Cornell University Library
- Past President: Toby Seay, Professor, Drexel University
- Vice-president (Membership): Margarida Ullate i Estanyol, Director of the Sound & Audiovisual Unit, BIBLIOTECA DE CATALUNYA
- Vice-president (Conferences): Perla Olivia Rodríguez Reséndiz, Instituto de Investigaciones Bibliotecológicas y de la Información, Universidad Nacional Autónoma de México
- Vice-president (Communications): Judith Opoku-Boateng, J. H. Kwabena Nketia Archives, Institute of African Studies, University of Ghana
- Secretary-General: Elisabeth Steinhäuser, Multimediales Archiv / Audioarchiv, Österreichischer Rundfunk Orf/ Austrian Broadcasting Corporation
- Treasurer: Yuri Shimoda, UCLA Ethnomusicology Archive
- Editor: Jennifer Vaughn, Archive Unit, Radio Free Europe/Radio Liberty
- Web Manager: Richard Ranft, Head of Sound & Vision The British Library

=== President ===
- 1969-1972: Donald Leavitt (Library of Congress, USA)
- 1972-1975: Timothy Eckersley (BBC, United Kingdom)
- 1975-1978: Dietrich Schüller (Austrian Academy of Sciences, Austria)
- 1978-1981: Rolf L. Schuursma (Foundation Film and Science, The Netherlands)
- 1981-1984: David G. Lance (Imperial War Museum, United Kingdom)
- 1984-1987: Ulf Scharlau (Süddeutscher Rundfunk, Germany)
- 1987-1990: Helen P. Harrison (Open University, United Kingdom)
- 1990-1993: Gerald D. Gibson (Library of Congress, USA)
- 1993-1996: James McCarthy (National Film and Sound Archives, Australia)
- 1996-1999: Sven Allerstrand (Arkivet för Ljud och Bild, Sweden)
- 1999-2002: Crispin Jewitt (British Library Sound Archive, United Kingdom)
- 2002-2005: Kurt Deggeller (MEMORIAV, Switzerland)
- 2005-2008: Richard Green (Library & Archives Canada, Canada)
- 2008-2011: Kevin Bradley (National Library of Australia, Australia)
- 2011-2014: Jacqueline von Arb (Norwegian Institute of Recorded Sound, Norway)
- 2014-2017: Ilse Assman (M-Net, MultiChoice, South Africa)
- 2017-2020: Toby Seay (Drexel University, USA)

=== Previous Board members ===
- 1969-1972: Donald Leavitt (USA), Rolf L. Schuursma (The Netherlands), Claes Cnattingius (Sweden)
- 1981-1984: David G. Lance (United Kingdom), Peter Burgis (Australia), Dietrich Schüller (Austria), Rolf L. Schuursma (The Netherlands), Helen Harrison (United Kingdom), Poul von Linstow (Denmark), Ulf Scharlau (Germany), Ann Brieglib
- 1984-1987: Ulf Scharlau (Germany), Peter Burgis (Australia), David Lance (UK), Dietrich Lotichius (Germany), Helen Harrison (United Kingdom), Anna Maria Foyer (Sweden), Dietrich Schüller (Austria)
- 1987-1990: Helen P. Harrison (United Kingdom), Ulf Scharlau (Germany), Magdalena Csève (Hungary), Hans Bosma (Netherlands), Jean-Claude Hayoz, Anna Maria Foyer (Sweden), Grace Koch (Australia)
- 1990-1993: Gerald D. Gibson (USA), Helen P. Harrison (United Kingdom), Magdalena Csève (Hungary), Hans Bosma (Netherlands), Giorgio Adamo (Italy), Sven Allerstrand (Sweden), Marit Grimstad (Norway), Grace Koch (Australia)
- 1993-1996: James McCarthy (Australia), Gerald D. Gibson (USA), Magdalena Csève (Hungary), Giorgio Adamo (Italy), Kurt Degeller (Switzerland), Sven Allerstrand (Sweden), Mark Jones (UK), Helen Harrison (UK)
- 1996-1999: Sven Allerstrand (Sweden), James McCarthy (Australia), Magdalena Csève (Hungary), Martin Elste (Germany), Gerald Gibson (USA), Albrecht Häfner (Germany), Mark Jones (UK), Chris Clark (UK)
- 1999-2002: Crispin Jewitt (United Kingdom), Sven Allerstrand (Sweden), Magdalena Csève (Hungary), John Spence (Australia), Maria Carla Cavagnis Sotgiu (Italy), Albrecht Häfner (Germany), Pekka Gronow (Finland), Chris Clark (UK)
- 2002-2005: Kurt Deggeller (Switzerland), Crispin Jewitt (United Kingdom), Magdalena Csève (Hungary), Shubha Chaudhuri (India), Richard Green (Canada), Eva Fønss-Jørgensen (Denmark), Anke Leenings (Germany), Ilse Assmann (South Africa)
- 2005-2008: Richard Green (Canada), Kurt Deggeller (Switzerland), Jacqueline von Arb (Norway), Per Holst (Denmark), Pio Pelizzari (Switzerland), Gunnel Jönsson (Sweden), Anke Leenings (Germany), Ilse Assmann (South Africa)
- 2008-2011: Kevin Bradley (Australia), Richard Green (Canada), Jacqueline von Arb (Norway), Lidia Camacho (Mexico), Daffyd Pritchard (UK), Pio Pelizzari (Switzerland), Ilse Assmann (South Africa), Anke Leenings (Germany), Janet Topp Fargion (UK), Richard Ranft (UK)
- 2011-2014: Jacqueline von Arb (Norway), Kevin Bradley (Australia), Pio Pelizzari (Switzerland), Alvaro Hegewisch (Mexico), Bruce Gordon (USA), Lynn Johnson (South Africa), Marit Hamre (Norway), Cassandra Gallegos (USA), Bertram Lyons (USA), Richard Ranft (UK)
- 2014-2017: Ilse Assman (South Africa), Jacqueline von Arb (Norway), Bruce Gordon (USA), Judith Gray (USA), Pio Pelizzari (Switzerland), Lynn Johnson (South Africa), Tommy Sjöberg (Sweden), Bertram Lyons (USA), Richard Ranft (UK)
- 2017-2020: Toby Seay (USA), Ilse Assman (South Africa), Zane Grosa (Latvia), Judith Gray (USA), Pio Pelizzari (Switzerland), Lynn Johnson (South Africa), Tommy Sjöberg (Sweden), Bertram Lyons (USA), Richard Ranft (UK)

== Committees and Sections ==
IASA Committees focus on topics that are of common interest to all archives and collections. IASA Sections provide a platform for the exchange of information between specific types of archives and collections.

=== Organising Knowledge Committee ===
The Organising Knowledge Committee concerns itself with standards and rules as well as with systems, automated or manual, for the documentation and cataloguing of audiovisual media. Officers (chairpersons, secretaries) of the Organising Knowledge Committee (previously known as the Cataloguing and Documentation Committee) are elected within the committee. The committees exclusively decide on the objects and tasks they deal with.

- Chair: Dr Johan Oomen, Netherlands Institute for Sound and Vision
- Vice-chair: Guy Marechal

=== Discography Committee ===
The Discography Committee deals with standards and recommended practices, as well as current and ongoing projects involving published recordings. Officers of the Discography Committee (chairpersons, secretaries) are elected within the committee. The committees exclusively decide on the objects and tasks they deal with.

- Chair: Peter Laurence, Eda Kuhn Loeb Music Library, Harvard University
- Vice-chair: Pedro Félix, Arquivo Nacional do Som (Equipa Instaladora), Alameda da Universidade
- Secretary: Margarida Ullate i Estanyol, Director of the Sound & Audiovisual Unit, BIBLIOTECA DE CATALUNYA

=== Technical Committee ===
The Technical Committee devotes itself to all technical aspects of sound and audiovisual recordings. This includes the actual recording processes, optimisation of reproduction of historical and modern recordings, transfer and digitisation technologies, standards and storage technologies, software and carriers. The Technical Committee is concerned with the preservation of sound and audiovisual media and technically sustainable approaches to future access. The creation of special publications enabling the AV archive community to take educated decisions regarding this, is a main concern of the committee. The Technical Committee has delivered several papers, which serve as technical guidelines, in the series Standards, Recommended Practices and Strategies. Officers of the Technical Committee (chairpersons, secretaries) are elected within the committee. The committees exclusively decide on the objects and tasks they deal with.

- Chair: Lars Gaustad, Senior Preservation Advisor, National Library of Norway
- Vice-chair: Nadja Wallaszkovits, Phonogrammarchiv der Österreichischen Akademie der Wissenschaften
- Secretary: Andrew Martin, DAMsmart, Australia

=== Training & Education Committee ===
The Training & Education Committee seeks to create and support an Audiovisual archival community who are knowledgeable, professional, capable of caring for their collections effectively, and acknowledged as such by their institutions or wider professional community. Officers of the Training & Education Committee (chairpersons, secretaries) are elected within the committee. The committees exclusively decide on the objects and tasks they deal with. The Training and Education Committee concerns itself with audiovisual archiving Training & Education, as well as concentrated actions in gaining multifunctional training and education material.

- Chair: Nadia Lai, Swiss National Sound Archives
- Vice-chair: Pio Pellizzari, Swiss National Sound Archives
- Secretary: Gisa Jähnichen, Berlin

=== National Archives Section ===
The National Archives Section is where members meet to consider issues facing officially designated national collections, e.g. acquisition policies, legal deposit, the management of large collections, whether held in archives, museums, libraries, dedicated audiovisual organisations or research institutes and universities.

- Chair: Janet Topp Fargion, The British Library
- Secretary: Dr. Gila Flam, The Hebrew University of Jerusalem

=== Broadcast Archives Section ===
The Broadcast Archives Section handles the special responsibilities of audiovisual archives in broadcast companies.

- Chair: Jennifer Vaughn, Senior Digital News Librarian, RFE/RL Prague, Czech Republic
- Vice-chair: Carolyn Birdsall, Researcher and teacher (AV archiving), Media Studies, University of Amsterdam
- Secretary: Lynn Johnson, e.TV (PTY) Limited, Cape Town

=== Europeana Sounds Task Force ===
The Europeana Sounds Task Force works on the following activities:

- investigate sources of funding to sustain the work of the 2014-2017 Europeana Sounds project
- raise awareness of the richness and threats to Europe's sound heritage
- provide expert training on providing correct metadata for adding audio heritage to the Europeana portal, via conference workshops and webinars
- investigate the curation of the Europeana channel for music and any other audio-related thematic channels on Europeana
- copyright and moral rights relating to providing access to audio heritage via Europeana
- information sharing on best practices for online audio access for the wider benefit of IASA members.
- Contact: Tom Miles, Europeana Sounds Metadata Coordinator, The British Library

== Regional branches ==
National and regional branches of IASA, with their own membership and activities, exist for Austria, Britain and Ireland and German-Swissgerman regions.

== See also ==
- Association for Recorded Sound Collections
- Association of Moving Image Archivists
- International Federation of Library Associations and Institutions
- International Federation of Television Archives
- International Council on Archives
- International Federation of Film Archives
- Coordinating Council of Audiovisual Archives Association
