= International Federation of Television Archives =

Fédération Internationale des Archives de Télévision / International Federation of Television Archives
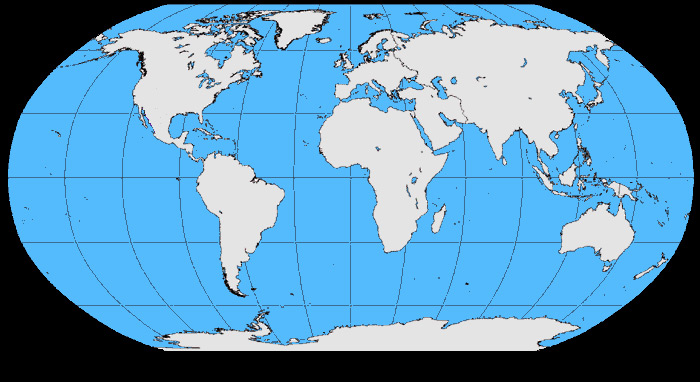
- zone of influence
- Abbreviation: FIAT/IFTA
- Formation: 1977
- Type: Association under French Law
- Purpose: Professional Body
- Headquarters: Paris
- Region served: Worldwide
- Members: ca. 250 institutions
- Official language: English, French
- President: Virginia Bazàn-Gil
- Main organ: Executive Council
- Staff: 1
- Volunteers: 50 approx.
- Website: www.fiatifta.org

The Fédération Internationale des Archives de Télévision - International Federation of Television Archives (FIAT/IFTA) is a worldwide association of institutions, commercial companies and individuals managing or with a special interest in audiovisual archiving in general and television archives in particular. Many members are commercial and public broadcasters, but also national (audiovisual) archives are involved ever more. In general terms the association wants to connect the members, to spread knowledge in the field of television archiving and to defend their interests on an international level.

== Organisation ==
The goal of the federation is to create cooperation among television archives, multimedia and audiovisual archives and libraries. To meet these goals, FIAT/IFTA provides forums to share knowledge and experience. Some of FIAT/IFTA’s main objectives are to provide a forum for exchange of knowledge and experience between its members, to promote the study of any topic relevant to the development and use of audiovisual archives and to establish international standards on key issues regarding all aspects of audiovisual media archive management. FIAT/IFTA has over 250 members. The federation is registered as an international association under French Law, with its official address at Institut national de l'Audiovisuel.

FIAT/IFTA has working relations with other organisations in the field, amongst others as a member of the Coordinating Council of Audiovisual Archives Associations.

=== Executive Council ===
FIAT/IFTA is chaired by a president (elected every 2 years with one possible re-election) and a General Secretary. The President, the General Secretary, the Treasurer and the Commission Chairs are ex-officio members of the Executive Council. Next to these, the other Executive Council members, accumulating to a maximum of 12, are elected every 4 years, by groups of 6 alternating every 2 years. The Executive Council can co-opt additional members at its own discretion.

=== Commissions ===
Next to the Executive Council, FIAT/IFTA has got 4 commissions, each with 6 to 12 members and a chair:

- Media Management Commission: the only commission existing since the founding of the organisation. It started off in 1977 as the 'Commission Systèmes Documentaires'. In 1981 the name was changed to 'Documentation Commission' and in 2001 to 'Media Management Commission'.
- Preservation & Migration Commission: called into existence in 1982 as the 'Technical Commission' it existed up until 2000. In 2007 it was restarted as the Preservation & Migration Commission.
- Value, Use and Copyright Commission: initiated in 2018.
- Media Studies Commission: started off in 1998 as a bridge towards the academic research world in the field of television studies. It was called the 'Academic Research Work Group' and in 2000 renamed as the 'Television Studies Working Group'. From 2003 it grew to a true commission calling itself the 'Television Studies Commission'. In 2016 the current name 'Media Studies Commission' was adopted.

== Initiatives ==
=== Conferences and seminars ===
==== FIAT/IFTA World Conference ====
The FIAT/IFTA World Conference is held each year, usually in October. The evening programme includes an opening cocktail, a gala dinner and the annual FIAT/IFTA Archive Achievement Awards gala. In the even years the World Conference also holds a General Assembly, during which the new president and a part of the Executive Council is elected. The Conference features keynotes speakers, panels discussions, workshops, masterclasses, case study presentations, social events, and networking opportunities.

==== Regional Seminars ====
Next to this, FIAT/IFTA organises regional seminars around the globe, in order to focus on regional television archiving challenges. Recent editions were held in Tunis (jointly with Arab States Broadcasting Union, 2024), Rio de Janeiro (Regional Media Management Seminar, 2016), Bucharest (Regional Television Studies Seminar, 2015) and Dubai (Regional Preservation & Migration Seminar, 2008).

==== Media Management Seminars ====
The Media Management Commission also organises a biannual seminar called 'Media Management Seminar' since 1998. The proceedings of these seminars are published and printed and freely available online via the FIAT/IFTA website. Recent editions were held in Dublin (2023), Stockholm (2019), Lugano (2017), Glasgow (2015), Hilversum (2013) and Toronto (2011).

=== FIAT/IFTA Archive Achievement Awards ===
FIAT/IFTA Archive Achievement Awards is a series of three annual awards given for the best use of archival material, the best archive preservation project and the most innovative use of archival material. Several other categories have come up and disappeared over the course of the nineties and 2000s. Since 2014 also a Lifetime Achievement Award is attributed annually to a person with exceptional and enduring merits in the field of audiovisual archiving.

Lifetime Achievement Awards have been granted to several prominent figures of the international audiovisual archiving world, including Dominique Saintville, Dietrich Schüller, Steve Bryant, Anne Hanford, Richard Wright, Vittorio Sette, Jean Varra, Annemieke de Jong, Roberto Rossetto, Jacqui Gupta, Daniel Teruggi and Eva-Lis Green.

=== FIAT/IFTA Save Your Archive ===
Save Your Archive is a program designed to help save endangered audiovisual collections. The ambition is to save the world audiovisual heritage, starting with a few collections. The Program does so by various means, including by providing financial support, training and/or technical assistance. The program speaks to FIAT/IFTA’s core mission – designing useful policies and tools to serve the archival community and developing cooperation among its members. The program works under the umbrella of the Archives at Risk campaign by the Coordinating Council of Audiovisual Archives Associations (CCAAA). Past projects in countries such as East Timor, Madagascar, Zimbabwe, Romania and Colombia have received help from the programme.

== History ==
FIAT/IFTA was founded as an association under French Law on 5 October 1977, when archives directors of mainly broadcasters but also national audiovisual archives felt the need to establish a separate organisation dedicated to television archives, as they were not accepted as members of the International Federation of Film Archives. Most members knew each other via the European Broadcasting Union. After preparative meetings in the course of 1976–77 in Paris, London and Rome, the first conference of FIAT/IFTA was held in October 1977 in Paris. After Paris 1977, annual World Conferences took place all over the world:

Year	Location	Host	Kind of event
2025	Roma	Cinecittà	World conference
2024	Bucharest	TVR (TV network)	World conference and General Assembly
2023	Locarno	SRG SSR	World conference
2022	Cape Town	SACIA	World conference and General Assembly
2021	originally planned in Cape Town but moved online	SACIA	World conference
2020	originally planned in Dublin but moved online	Raidió Teilifís Éireann	World conference and General Assembly with International Association of Sound and Audiovisual Archives
2019	Dubrovnik	HRT	World conference
2018	Venice	RAI	World conference and General Assembly
2017	Mexico City	Fonoteca Nacional, TV UNAM, Sistema Público de Radiodifusión del Estado Mexicano	World conference
2016	Warsaw	Narodowy Instytut Audiowisualny	World conference and General Assembly
2015	Vienna	ORF	World conference
2014	Amsterdam	Netherlands Institute for Sound and Vision	World conference and General Assembly
2013	Dubai	Middle East Broadcasting Center	World conference
2012	London	BBC, British Library, FOCAL International	World conference and General Assembly
2011	Turin	RAI	World conference
2010	Dublin	RTÉ	World conference and General Assembly
2009	Beijing	CCTV	World conference
2008	Copenhagen	DR (broadcaster)	World conference and General Assembly
2007	Lisbon	RTP	World conference
2006	Madrid	Universidad Carlos III de Madrid	World conference and General Assembly
2005	New York City	CBS	World conference
2004	Paris	Institut National de l'Audiovisuel	World conference and General Assembly
2003	Brussels	VRT, RTBF	World Conference
2002	Antalya	TRT	World Conference and General Assembly
2001	London	BBC, British Film Institute	World Conference
2000	Vienna	ORF	World Conference and General Assembly
1999	Santiago de Chile	Televisión Nacional de Chile	Seminar
1998	Florence	RAI	World Conference and General Assembly
1997	Budapest	MTVA (Hungary)	Seminar
1996	Paris	Institut National de l'Audiovisuel	World Conference and General Assembly
1995	Washington	Library of Congress, together with AMIA	Seminar
1994	Bogensee	Deutsches Rundfunkarchiv, together with IASA	World Conference and General Assembly
1993	Sofia	Bulgarian National Television	Seminar
1992	Genève	SRG SSR, then known as SSR	World Conference and General Assembly
1991	Turin	RAI	Seminar
1990	Tokyo	BPCJ	World Conference and General Assembly
1989	Lisbon	RTP	Seminar
1988	Hilversum, The Hague	Nederlands Omroepproduktie Bedrijf	World Conference and General Assembly
1987	West-Berlin	Deutsches Rundfunkarchiv	Seminar
1986	Montréal	Concordia University	World Conference and General Assembly
1985	London	BBC	Seminar
1984	Madrid	RTVE	World Conference and General Assembly
1983	Stockholm	SVT	Seminar
1982	Rio de Janeiro	Rede Globo	World Conference and General Assembly
1981	Monte Estoril	RTP	Seminar
1980	Ottawa	Library and Archives Canada	Annual Meeting
1979	Santander	RTVE	Annual Meeting
1978	Rome	RAI	Annual Meeting
1977	Paris	Institut national de l'audiovisuel	Annual Meeting

Regarding the organisation of the federation, next to the ones mentioned above several other commissions have come and gone:

- Training Commission: from 1977 to 1979 and from 1981 until 2006,
- Preservation and Selection Commission: from 1977 to 1986,
- Cultural Use Commission: from 1980 to 1982,
- Information Exchange Commission: from 1984 to 1986,

The past presidents of FIAT/IFTA were:

Name	Institution	Start year of presidency	End year of presidency
Brecht Declercq	meemoo until 2022, then Radiotelevisione svizzera	2020	2024
Brighid Dooley	RTÉ	2016	2020
Jan Müller	Dutch Institute for Sound and Vision	2012	2016
Herbert Hayduck	ORF	2008	2012
Edwin van Huis	Dutch Institute for Sound and Vision	2006	2008
Emmanuel Hoog	INA	2002	2006
Peter Dusek	ORF	1998	2002
Tedd Johansen	NRK	1994	1998
Vittorio Sette	RAI	1990	1994
Anne Hanford	BBC	1982	1990
Otto Sprenger	ARD	1978	1982

== See also ==
- UNESCO Memory of the World
- UNESCO World Day for Audiovisual Heritage
- National Film Preservation Foundation
- Film preservation
- Optical media preservation
