= Association for Recorded Sound Collections =

Nonprofit organization dedicated to the preservation and study of sound recordings

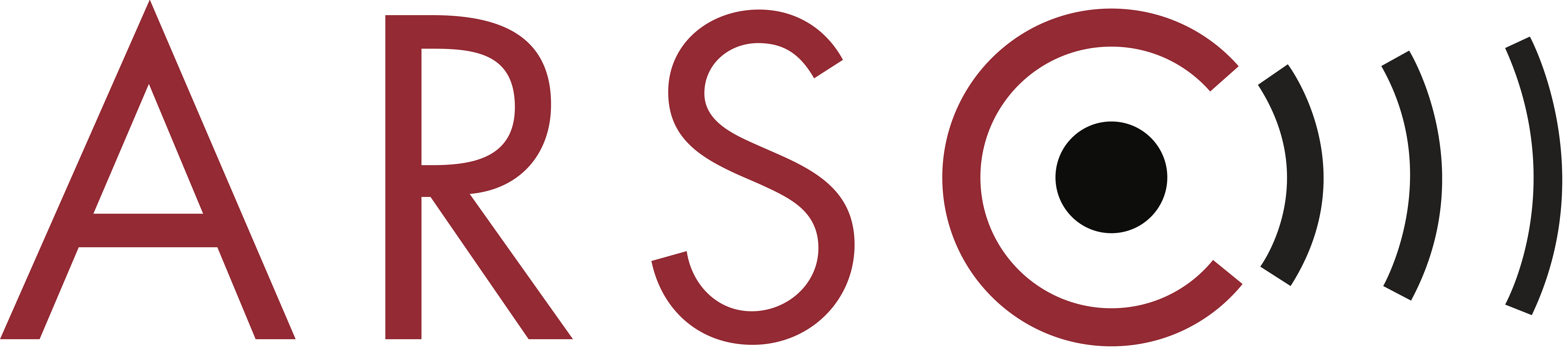
- Abbreviation: ARSC
- Formation: 1966
- Purpose: Professional Body
- Region served: Worldwide
- Official language: US English
- Executive Director: Nathan Georgitis
- Main organ: Board of Directors
- Website: arsc-audio.org

The Association for Recorded Sound Collections (ARSC) is a nonprofit organization dedicated to the preservation and study of sound recordings.

Established in 1966, members include record collectors, discographers, and audio engineers, together with librarians, curators, archivists, and researchers.

== History ==
ARSC was founded in 1966 by a group of academics, primarily music librarians, who felt that contemporary professional associations such as the Music Library Association (MLA) were not paying enough attention to the special needs of recorded sound archives, and that scholars were giving too little attention to historical recorded sound as opposed to printed sources. In contrast to professional organizations such as the MLA and the American Library Association, ARSC by design also welcomed private record collectors, since they held (and needed to preserve) many important recordings that were not present in institutional collections. Furthermore, ARSC was intended to bring together collectors from all genres, classical, jazz, popular, etc., as well as those concerned with spoken word recordings.

After three organizational meetings in 1965 and 1966, and the election of its first president, Philip L. Miller, Chief of the Music Division, New York Public Library, ARSC's first annual conference was held at Indiana University in March 1967. Its first publication was the Preliminary Directory of Sound Recording Collections in the United States and Canada (1967), listing 1,500 public and private collections. This was followed by the launch of the ARSC Journal (1968), the ARSC Newsletter (1977), and other publications. Other important projects have included The Rigler-Deutsch Index, a union catalog of the 615,000 78 rpm holdings of five major public archives. Data from this massive project is now part of the WorldCat online library catalog.

ARSC is governed by an eight-person board of directors, seven of whom are elected biennially by the membership. The eighth, the executive director, is appointed by the president with the approval of the board, is non-voting, and handles day-to-day operations. In the early years ARSC's leadership consisted primarily of professional archivists, but in later years it broadened to include scholars and private collectors, several of whom have served as president. A historical listing of officers and committee chairs can be found on the association's website.

Although ARSC is based in the U.S., about ten percent of its membership is located in other countries. The association maintains close relations with the International Association of Sound and Audiovisual Archives (IASA) and is a member of the Coordinating Council of Audiovisual Archives Associations (CCAAA), an international umbrella group concerned with audiovisual preservation matters worldwide. ARSC is also an observer of the World Intellectual Property Organization (WIPO).

== Presidents ==
- 2024-2026 - Yuri Shimoda
- 2022-2024 - Tim Brooks
- 2020-2022 - Rebecca Chandler
- 2018-2020 - Cary Ginell
- 2016-2018 - Matthew Barton
- 2014-2016 - Patrick Feaster
- 2012-2014 - Tim Brooks
- 2010-2012 - Vincent Pelote
- 2008-2010 - David Seubert
- 2006-2008 - Sam Brylawski
- 2004-2006 - Brenda Nelson-Strauss
- 2002-2004 - James Farrington
- 2000-2002 - Mark Tolleson
- 1998-2000 - Suzanne Stover
- 1996-1998 - Ted P. Sheldon
- 1994-1996 - Jerome F.Weber
- 1992-1994 - Martin A. Silver
- 1990-1992 - Barbara Sawka
- 1988-1990 - Donald E. McCormick
- 1986-1988 - Michael Biel
- 1984-1986 - Michael H. Gray
- 1982-1984 - Tim Brooks
- 1980-1982 - David Hall
- 1978-1980 - Garrett Bowles
- 1976-1978 - Gerald D. Gibson
- 1974-1976 - Robert Carneal
- 1971-1974 - Don L. Roberts
- 1966-1971 - Philip L. Miller

== Annual conference ==
ARSC has held an annual conference each year since 1967. It generally takes place over three days between April and June in a city in the United States, though four conferences have taken place in Canada and one in London. Several conferences have been held jointly with the International Association of Sound and Audiovisual Archives.

Typically, there are two session tracks, one focusing on artists and repertoire, musical genres, collecting, and discographies, the other on technical issues of audio preservation and restoration, library cataloging issues, the history of recorded sound, etc.

Cumulatively, approximately 1,400 papers and panels have been presented through 2026, and nearly all have been professionally audio (and sometimes video) recorded and made available to members online, on the Aviary platform. More than 200 are available free to the public on ARSC's YouTube channel.

In addition, since 2012 most workshops conducted in conjunction with the conference have been streamed live.

== Publications ==
The ARSC Journal is a peer-reviewed journal that has been in existence since 1968. It's currently published semi-annually.

it “serves to document the history of sound recording and includes original articles on many aspects of research and preservation: biography; cataloging; copyright law; current research; discography; technical aspects of sound restoration, etc...”

It also includes reviews of books and sound recordings, as well as an ongoing bibliography of articles of interest that have appeared in other journals. In all, about 3,000 articles and reviews have been published through 2026, all of which are now available online.

The ARSC Newsletter, containing association news, is published two or three times a year, and a Membership Directory is published electronically each year. Other publications include the ARSC Guide to Audio Preservation (2015), a guide for smaller public and private collections.

== Awards ==
Beginning in 1991 ARSC has presented a number of Awards for Excellence

“to authors and publishers of books, articles, or recording liner notes, to recognize outstanding published research in the field of recorded sound.”

Each year, a Lifetime Achievement Award is presented for recorded sound research and publication, and an Award for Distinguished Service to Historical Recordings is presented for other contributions to the field.

Cristóbal Díaz Ayala, a Cuban musicologist and original curator of the Diaz Ayala Cuban and Latin American Popular Music Collection, was awarded the Lifetime Achievement Award in 2009.

== Grants ==
The Research Grants Program supports research involving audio preservation and sound recordings, including discographies and historical studies of the sound recording industry.

From 2006-2020 the Preservation of Classical Music Historical Recordings Grants Program supported “the preservation of historically significant sound recordings of Western Art Music.”

Beginning in 2023 the Independent Initiatives Award has provided no-strings monetary awards to individuals who have materially advanced the field of historical audio preservation on their own, without institutional support.

ARSC also provides a modest number of Travel Grants for first-time attendees at the annual conference.

== Email discussion list and social media ==
ARSClist is an unmoderated email discussion list sponsored by ARSC. Subscription is open to members and to the archival community at large.

ARSC also has a presence on Facebook, Twitter, LinkedIn, and YouTube, among other places.

== Committees ==
=== Copyright and Fair Use ===
Since 2005, the Copyright and Fair Use Committee has led the organization in advocating for changes in U.S. copyright laws to ensure the preservation of and public access to historical sound recordings. This has included testimony at U.S. Copyright Office hearings and a number of studies and position papers.

In 2018 ARSC was instrumental in securing provisions within the landmark Music Modernization Act that established for the first time a public domain for sound recordings in the U.S., along with other provisions facilitating preservation and access to historical recordings (which had previously been heavily restricted). ARSC also favors changes in copyright law related to orphan works. From 2008-2025 ARSC joined with other organizations to establish the Historical Recording Coalition for Access and Preservation to pursue these issues.

The Copyright and Fair Use Committee keeps members informed of news related to sound recording copyright and fair use issues.

=== Technical ===
The Technical Committee focuses on audio technology, providing guidance to institutions and audio professionals in preserving and maintaining access to sound recordings.

=== Education and Training ===
The Education and Training Committee provides publications and online resources, and conducts a workshop at the annual conference covering topics that have included copyright, grant applications, disaster recovery, and the preservation and handling of digital resources.

== See also ==
- Coordinating Council of Audiovisual Archives Association
- UNESCO Memory of the World
- UNESCO World Day for Audiovisual Heritage
- Optical media preservation
