= Videolog =

Videolog or video log may refer to:

- Video logging, a process of labelling video footage according to its content
- Vlog, a type of blog created in the medium of video

== Media ==
- Videolog, a mail-order video distribution service jointly founded by The Cannon Group, Inc. and Columbia House
- Videolog, a human interest television series produced and hosted by Huell Howser
- Videolog.tv, a defunct video-sharing website that operated from 2004 to 2015.
