= Shefter =

Shefter is a surname. Notable people with the surname include:

- Bert Shefter (1902–1999), Russian-born film composer
- Martin Shefter (1943–2023), American political scientist and author
- Milt Shefter, American film and media-asset archivist and preservationist

== See also ==
- Adam Schefter
