= Indigenous Archives Collective =

The Indigenous Archives Collective, based in Australia, includes Indigenous and non-Indigenous professional archivists and researchers. It provides a network connecting Indigenous people working in archives, libraries, galleries and museums internationally. Led by Indigenous practitioners and researchers the Collective fosters culturally safe collaboration, dialogue and reflexive practice. A goal of the Collective is advocacy for transformation in the Australian and international galleries, libraries, archives and museums (GLAM) sector.

== History ==
The Collective began as the Indigenous Archives Network, established in 2011, by Dr Shannon Faulkhead and Kirsten Thorpe through a National Archives of Australia Ian Maclean Research Award and operated from 2011 to 2016. In 2018, a group of researchers and archives practitioners, both Indigenous and non-Indigenous, reformed the group as the Indigenous Archives Collective, with involvement of founding members of the original Network Dr Kirsten Thorpe and Dr Shannon Faulkhead.

== Activity ==
The group represents Indigenous, and non-Indigenous researchers and professionals, who work across the wider galleries, libraries, archives and museums sector. Archives and historical collections frequently include materials that relate to Indigenous people and their cultural and traditional knowledge, shared through art, dance and storytelling, as well as physical collections and publications collected by colonists, governments and researchers. The Collective has published a position statement on the right of Indigenous people to reply and respond to information held in archives. The Indigenous Archives Collective developed the Indigenous Referencing Guidance for Indigenous Knowledges in partnership with CAVAL as a guide for citing Indigenous knowledges in academic writing.

Archives with materials relating to Indigenous people require additional considerations of cultural safety, Indigenous cultural and intellectual property rights, as well as the right of Indigenous peoples to determine the use and access provisions for collection materials that reflect their own history, culture, language and traditions to be considered.

These are international archive considerations as reflected in the International Council on Archives Tandanya - Adelaide Declaration:

'…responsibility to re-imagine the meaning of archives as an engaging model of social memory; to embrace the Indigenous worldviews and methods of creating, sharing and preserving valued knowledge. To decolonise our archival principles with Indigenous knowledge methods, to open the meaning of public archives to Indigenous interpretations,…the remodelling of traditional archival principles’ ..‘The result will be a new model of public archives as an ethical space of encounter, respect, negotiation and collaboration without the dominance or judgement of distant and enveloping authority'. Tandanya - Adelaide Declaration

The Indigenous Archives Collective publishes a blog to foster discussion about Indigenous archives. The logo of the Indigenous Archives Collective was designed by Maree Clarke, a Mutti Mutti / Yorta Yorta and Boon Wurrung / Wemba Wemba artist.
