= Schleman =

Schleman is a surname. Notable people with the surname include:

- Helen B. Schleman (1902–1992), Purdue University's Dean of Women
- Hilton Schleman (1905–1952), English publicity agent and author of books on jazz music
