= Discography =

Study and cataloging of published sound recordings

Discography is the study and cataloging of published sound recordings and/or video recordings, often by specified artists or within identified music genres. The exact information included varies depending on the type and scope of the discography, but a discography entry for a specific recording will often list such details as the names of the artists involved, the time and place of the recording, the title of the piece performed, release dates, chart positions, and sales figures.

A discography can also refer to the recordings catalogue of an individual artist, group, or orchestra. This is distinct from a sessionography, which is a catalogue of recording sessions, rather than a catalogue of the records, in whatever medium, that are made from those recordings. The two are sometimes confused, especially in jazz, as specific release dates for jazz records are often difficult to ascertain, and session dates are substituted as a means of organizing an artist's catalogue.

A compilation of a performer's piano rolls can be called a "rollography." A listing of video recordings can be called a "videography"; for example, Charles H. Parsons' An Opera Videography (1997, vol. xx of The Mellen Opera Reference Index), which lists 895 videos of 298 operas by 116 composers.

== History ==
The term discography may have first been published in the Phonograph Monthly Review in January 1931, as "A Farrar Discography" by William Henry Seltsam. The article listed recordings of American soprano Geraldine Farrar from 1906 to 1923. Each entry included title, composer, manufacturer's issue number and the estimated year of recording. Except for her 1906 Berlin recordings, entries were listed by title as solos, duets, trios, and quartets.

The term was popularized in the 1930s by collectors of jazz records, i.e. 'to study and write about the discs of music'. This was crucial for the study of jazz, since recordings were the primary source of information, rather than sheet music or scores. Jazz fans did research and self-published discographies about when jazz records were made and what musicians were on the records, as record companies did not commonly include that information on or with the records at that time. Two early jazz discographies were Rhythm on Record by Hilton Schleman and Hot Discography by Charles Delaunay.

Definitions have changed over time. Webster's Seventh New Collegiate Dictionary (1963) defines a discography as "a descriptive compilation of phonograph records by groups"; Random House Webster's Collegiate Dictionary (1991), has "a selective or complete list of phonograph recordings, typically of one composer, performer, or conductor". However, The American Heritage Dictionary of the English Language, Fourth Edition (2006), has "a comprehensive list of the recordings made by a particular performer or of a particular composer's works"; the New Oxford American Dictionary, Third Edition (2010), has "a descriptive catalog of musical recordings, particularly those of a performer or composer". Recent definitions do not distinguish between audio and video recordings, nor do they specify any particular physical format (such as disc, tape, or computer storage).

== Notable books of discography ==
The following books list detailed information on the complete discographies of specific record labels, music scenes or genres.

- Allen, Walter C. - Hendersonia: The Music of Fletcher Henderson and his Musicians, A Bio-discography, Jazz Monographs No. 4, Highland Park, N.J.: Walter C. Allen, 1973.
- Andrews, Frank - Columbia 10" records, 1904-30. [London]: City of London Phonograph and Gramophone Society, 1985
- Arnold, Claude Graveley - The Orchestra on Record, 1896-1926: An Encyclopedia of Orchestral Recordings Made by the Acoustical Process, Greenwood Press 1997
- Badrock, Arthur and Andrews, Frank - The "Cinch" Record (September 1913 - January 1916) [London]: City of London Phonograph and Gramophone Society, 2000
- Badrock, Arthur - Tower Records (1920-1922) published by the author, Norwich, 2001
- Balacco, Thomas - Aussie Vinyl Record Guide published by Hardshell Publishing, 2016 - ISBN 9780994549501 Association For Recorded Sound Collections - 2017 Best Discography - Best Historical Research on General Recording Topics
- Balacco, Thomas - Australia/NZ Vinyl Record Guide published by Hardshell Publishing, 2024 - ISBN 9780994549518
- Barr, Steven C. - The (Almost) Complete 78 r.p.m. Record Dating Guide. Second ed. [Toronto, Ont.]: S.C. Barr, 1980. 51 p. Without ISBN
- Barr, Steven C. - Canadian and Canadian-U.S. Label Numerical Correlations [of] 78 r.p.m. [disc recordings. Toronto, Ont.: S.C. Barr] 1983. 4 p. OCLC 756988573
- Bauer, Roberto - The New Catalogue of Historical Records, 1898-1908/09. London: Sidgwick & Jackson, 1947. 494 p. SBN (as found in the 1972 printing) 283-48420-9
- Brooks, Tim - Little Wonder Records, The New Amberola Phonograph Company 1999
- Connor, D. Russell and Hicks, Warren W. - BG On The Record; A bio-discography of Benny Goodman, Arlington House 1969
- Cuscuna, Michael; Michel Ruppli (2001). The Blue Note Label. Greenwood Press. ISBN 0-313-31826-3.
- Daniels, Bill - Disc Dating Guide, 1940-1949. Oak Lawn Books, Providence, R.I., 1981
- Dethlefson, Ronald - Edison Blue Amberol Recordings 1912-1914, (2nd Edition) Stationery X-Press 1997
- Díaz-Ayala, Cristóbal - Encyclopedic Discography of Cuban Music, Vol. 1 (1898-1925). Florida International University, 2014.
- Díaz-Ayala, Cristóbal - Encyclopedic Discography of Cuban Music, Vol. 2 (1925-1960). Florida International University, 2014.
- Dixon, Robert M.W., John Godrich and Howard W. Rye - Blues & Gospel Records 1890-1943, 4th ed., Clarendon Press 1997. N.B.: An informative narrative of blues recording activity is Recording the Blues, by two of these authors, i.e. Dixon and Godrich (London: Studio Vista, 1970, 85 amply ill. p.)
- Emery, Marc - Jazz [and] Blues Catalog. London, Ont.: City Lights Bookshop, [ca. 1978]. N.B.: Sale catalogue of a large and comprehensive collection of LP discs formerly held by a private collector; there are fairly numerous name and title spelling errors, but it constitutes a good brief-listed discography of the genre
- Fagan, Ted and Moran, William - The Encyclopedic Discography of Victor Records vol. 1, Greenwood Press 1983
- Fagan, Ted and Moran, William - The Encyclopedic Discography of Victor Records vol. 2, Greenwood Press 1986
- Fancourt, Les and Bob McGrath - The Blues Discography 1943-1970, Eyeball Productions 2006
- Fancourt, Leslie - British Blues 1950s to 1970: A Selective Discography, self-published 2021. N.B. Foreword by Neil Slaven
- Foreman, Lewis - Systematic Discography. London, C. Bingley, 1974. 144 p. N.B. This is an instructional and style manual to aid its user in mastering or improving a researcher's discographical skills. ISBN 978-0-85157-161-4
- Guterman, Jimmy, and Owen O'Donnell - The Worst Rock 'n' Roll Records of All Time: a Fan's Guide to the Stuff [that] You Love to Hate! in series: Citadel Press Book[s]. New York: Carol Publishing Group, 1991. N.B.: Annotated discography. ISBN 0-8065-1231-8
- Haas, Lük - Discography of Eastern European Punk Music 1977-1999, Tian An Men 89, Strasbourg, France 2000.
- Hall, Ron - The CHUM Chart Book: a Complete Listing of Every Record To Make the 'CHUM Chart' from Its Beginning on 27 May 1957 through 14 June 1986. Eticobicoke, Ont.: Stardust Productions, 1990. N.B.: On front cover: "CHUM's [radio station] dial 1050, Hit Parade". Without ISBN
- Harris, Steve - Film, Television, and Stage Music on Phonograph Records: a Discography. Jefferson, N.C.: McFarland & Co., 1988. ix, 445 p. ISBN 0-89950-251-2
- Harrison, Max, [et al.] - Modern Jazz: the Essential Records, 1945-1970, a Critical Selection. London: Aquarius Books, 1975. 131, [9] p. N.B.: Subtitle combined from t.p. and a portion of the cover subtitle statement. This discography is annotated.
- Jepsen, Jorgen Grunnet - Jazz Records, 1942-196x, Karl Emil Knudsen 1963-1970
- Jones, Mark - Bristol Folk: a Discographical History of Bristol Folk Music in the 1960s and 1970s, Bristol Folk Publications 2009
- Jones, Mark - The Famous Charisma Discography, The Record Press 2010. N.B. Forewords by Michael Palin and Chris Adams
- Jones, Mark - The Saydisc and Village Thing Discography, The Record Press 2010
- Jones, Mark - Transacord: Sounds of Steam, The Record Press 2011. N.B. This was published with a free CD of examples from the Transacord archive
- Jones, Mark - The Virgin Discography: the 1970s, The Record Press 2013
- Jones, Mark - The B&C Discography 1968-1975, The Record Press 2013. N.B. Nominated for a 2014 Association for Recorded Sound Collections excellence award (rock music discographies).
- Jones, Mark - The Immediate Discography: the First 20 Years, The Record Press 2016. N.B. Winner of the 2017 Association for Recorded Sound Collections award for excellence (rock music discographies).
- Jones, Mark - The B&C Discography 1968-1975 (expanded 2nd Ed.), The Record Press 2015.
- Jones, Mark - The British Classical Record Industry, 1945 to 1959, The Record Press 2020. N.B. A finalist in the 2021 Association for Recorded Sound Collections excellence award (best historical research in recorded classical).
- Jones, Mark - Blues from the Avon Delta: the Matchbox Blues Story, The Record Press 2021
- Kennedy, Ted - Canada Pop Weekly: the Record [according to] "R.P.M." [magazine]. Kelowna, B.C.: Canadian Chart Research, [1992?]. 595 p.
- Kennedy, Ted - Charts Canada: "R.P.M." [magazine], the Record. Kelowna, B.C.: Canadian Chart Research, [1989]. 293, [7] p.
- Kennedy, Ted - Country Canada: the Record [according to] "R.P.M." [magazine]. Kelowna, B.C.: Canadian Chart Research, [1992?]. 437 oblong p.
- Kennedy, Ted - Maple Music: the Record [according to] "R.P.M." [magazine]. Kelowna, B.C.: Canadian Chart Research, [1992]. 572, [16] oblong p. N.B.: "'Maple Music' is [primarily]a listing of every song to enter the national top 40 pop record charts in North America with primary analysis on Canadian charts from 'R.P.M.' [magazine] and 'The Record'."
- Koenigsberg, Allen - Edison Cylinder Records 1889-1912, (2nd Edition) APM Press 1987
- Ledbitter, Mike, & Slaven, Neil - Blues Records: 1943-1966, Oak Publications 1968
- Laird, Ross - Tantalizing Tingles A Discography of Early Ragtime, Jazz, and Novelty Syncopated Piano Recordings, 1889-1934, Greenwood Press 1995
- Laird, Ross - Moanin'Low; A discography of female popular vocal recordings 1920-1933, Greenwood Press 1996
- Laird, Ross - Brunswick records: a discography of recordings, 1916-1931, Greenwood Press, 2001.
- Laird, Ross & Rust, Brian - Discography of OKeh Records, 1918-1934. By Ross Laird and Brian Rust. Praeger, 2004
- Legere, Bill - Record Collectors Guide of Country LPs. Limited ed. Mississauga, Ont.: W.J. Legere, 1977. 269, 25, 29, 2 p., perforated and looseleaf. Without ISBN
- Legere, Bill - E[lectrical] T[anscription]s: Transcription Library of Bill Legere. Mississauga, Ont.: B. Legere, [1977]. 3 vols., each of which is perforated and looseleaf. N.B.: Vol. 1-2, Country Artists—vol. 2, Pop Artists. Without ISBN
- Lyons, Len - The 101 Best Jazz Albums: a History of Jazz on Records, New York: W. Morrow & Co., 1980. 476 p., ill. with b&w photos. ISBN 0-688-03720-8 pbk
- Lyttle, Brendan - A Chartology of Canadian Popular Music, Part Two, 1977 to 1980. Record Research Services, Calgary, [1980?]
- McDonald, Ian - British Railways on Vinyl: 1931 to 1989, The Record Press 2013
- Moody, Pete - Memphis Minnie: the Life & Recording History of the Great Female Country Blues Singer, Sunflower 1967
- Moody, Pete - Big Maceo: Chicago Blues Pianist, 1905-1953 - His Life & Recording History, Sunflower 1968
- Moogk, Edward Balthasar - Roll Back the Years: History of Canadian Recorded Sound and Its Legacy, Genesis to 1930. Ottawa, Ont.: National Library of Canada, 1975. N.B.: In part, also, a bio-discography; the hardback ed. comes with a "phonodisc of historical Canadian recordings" (33 1/3 r.p.m., mono., 17 cm.) which the 1980 pbk. reprint lacks. ISBN 0-660-01382-7 (pbk.)
- Moogk, Edith Kathryn - Title Index to Canadian Works Listed in Edward B. Moogk's Roll Back the Years, History of Canadian Recorded Sound, Genesis to 1930, in series, C.A.M.L. Occasional Papers, no. 1. Ottawa, Ont.: Canadian Association of Music Libraries, 1988. N.B.: The t.p. and fore-matter also in French; supplements the index within E. B. Moogk's book. ISBN 0-9690583-3-0
- Moses, Julian Morton - American Celebrity Recordings 1900-1925, Monarch Record Enterprises, 1993
- Palm, Jim - Railways on Record, Avon-Anglia Publications & Services 1980
- Propes, Steve - Golden Oldies: a Guide to [19]50s & [19]60s Popular Rock & Roll Record Collecting. First ed. Radnor, Penn.: Chilton Book Co., 1975. ISBN 0-8019-6221-8 pbk.
- Rockwell, T. Malcolm - Hawaiian & Hawaiian Guitar Records 1891-1960, Mahina Piha Press, 2007
- Ruppli, Michel - Atlantic Records, Greenwood Press 1979
- Ruppli, Michel - The Savoy Labels, Greenwood Press 1980
- Ruppli, Michel & Porter, Bob - The Prestige Label, Greenwood Press 1980
- Ruppli, Michel - The Chess Labels, Greenwood Press 1983
- Ruppli, Michel - The King Labels, Greenwood Press 1985
- Ruppli, Michel - The Clef/Verve Labels, Greenwood Press 1986
- Ruppli, Michel - The Aladdin/Imperial Labels, Greenwood Press 1991
- Ruppli, Michel & Novitsky, Ed - The Mercury Labels, Greenwood Press 1993
- Ruppli, Michel - The Decca Labels, Greenwood Press 1996
- Ruppli, Michel & Novitsky, Ed - The MGM Labels, Greenwood Press 1998
- Ruppli, Michel, Daniels, Bill & Novitsky, Ed - The Capitol Label Discography, Names & Numbers, 2007
- Russell, Tony - Country Music Records; A discography, 1921-1942, Oxford University Press, 2004
- Rust, Brian - The Victor Master Book Vol. 2, published by the author, 1969
- Rust, Brian - The American Dance Band Discography, Arlington House 1975
- Rust, Brian - London Musical Shows On Record 1897 - 1976, General Gramophone Publications 1977
- Rust, Brian - British Music Hall On Record, General Gramophone Publications 1979
- Rust, Brian (1980). Brian Rust's Guide to Discography. Discographies, Number 4 Greenwood Press. ISBN 0-313-22086-7.
- Rust, Brian and Forbes, Sandy - British Dance Bands On Record 1911 to 1945, General Gramophone Publications 1987
- Rust, Brian and Debus, Allen G. - The Complete Entertainment Discography from 1897 to 1942, (2nd Edition) Da Capo Press 1989
- Rust, Brian & Brooks, Tim - The Columbia Master Book Discography, Greenwood Press, 1999.
- Rust, Brian - Jazz and Ragtime Records (1897 - 1942), (6th Edition) Mainspring Press 2003
- Smith, Bente - Cue Track: the Canadian Record & Tape Guide. French trans. [of the introd.] by Inge K. Nielsen. First ed. Winnipeg, Man.: Cue Track, 1980. Without ISBN or ISSN
- Sutton, Allan - Cakewalks, Rags and Novelties; The International Ragtime Discography (1894 - 1930), Mainspring Press 2004
- Tolley, Trevor - Discographical Essays, Seven Willows, [2009]

== Web discographies ==
Notable online music databases include AllMusic, Discogs (community-built), freedb, Gracenote, MusicBrainz (community-built) and Rate Your Music (community-built).

== See also ==
- Category:Discographies (for individual artists' discographies)
- MPEG-4
- International Standard Music Number
- International Standard Audiovisual Number
- International Standard Musical Work Code
- International Standard Recording Code
- Audio engineer
- Bibliography
