= National Archives Centre =

The National Archives Centre (French: Centre national des archives, or CNA) is the national archives of Burkina Faso. It is located in Ouagadougou. Since 2010, the Archivistes sans Frontières project has been assisting Burkina Faso in developing the archives.

== See also ==
- National Library of Burkina Faso
