= Chick Webb =

American jazz and swing drummer and bandleader (1905–1939)

- Born: William Henry Webb; February 10, 1905; Baltimore, Maryland, U.S.
- Died: June 16, 1939 (aged 34) Baltimore, Maryland, U.S.
- Genres: Jazz
- Occupations: Musician, bandleader
- Instrument: Drums
- Years active: c. 1926–1939

William Henry "Chick" Webb (February 10, 1905 – June 16, 1939) was an American jazz and swing music drummer and band leader.

== Early life ==
Webb was born in Baltimore, Maryland, to William H. and Marie Webb. The year of his birth is disputed. The Encyclopædia Britannica and Allmusic indicate 1905, and this seems to be supported by census information. Other publications claim other years. During Webb's lifetime, a December 1937 DownBeat magazine article, "The Rise of a Crippled Genius", stated he was born in 1909, which is the year that appears on his grave marker. In 1939, The New York Times stated that Webb was born in 1907, the year also suggested in Rhythm on Record by Hilton Schleman.

Webb was one of four children; the other three were sisters (Bessie, Mabel, and Ethel). His sister Mabel married Wilbur Porter around 1928. As an infant, Webb fell down some stairs in his family's home, crushing several vertebrae and requiring surgery, from which he never regained full mobility. The injury progressed to Pott's disease, tuberculosis of the spine, leaving Webb with short stature and a badly deformed spine, which caused him to appear hunchbacked. The idea of playing an instrument was suggested by his doctor to "loosen up" his bones. Webb supported himself as a newspaper boy to save enough money to buy drums and first played professionally at age 11.

== Career ==
At age 17, Webb moved to New York City, and by 1926, he was leading his own band in Harlem. Jazz drummer Tommy Benford said that he gave Webb drum lessons when he first reached New York.

Webb alternated between band tours and residencies at New York City clubs through the late 1920s. In 1931, his band became the house band at the Savoy Ballroom. Webb became one of the best-regarded bandleaders and drummers of the new "swing" style. Drummer Buddy Rich cited Webb's powerful technique and virtuoso performances as heavily influential on his own drumming, and even referred to Webb as "the daddy of them all". Webb was unable to read music, and instead memorized the arrangements played by the band and conducted from a platform in the center. He used custom-made pedals, goose-neck cymbal holders, a 28-inch bass drum and other percussion instruments.

At the Savoy, Webb competed in battle of the bands contests with the Benny Goodman Orchestra and the Count Basie Orchestra. Webb lost to Duke Ellington in 1937. Although a judge declared Webb's band the winner in 1938 over Count Basie's, and Basie himself said he was relieved to come away from the contest without embarrassing himself, musicians debated the result for decades.

Webb married Martha Loretta Ferguson (also known as "Sally"), and in 1935, he began featuring a teenaged Ella Fitzgerald as a vocalist. Webb and Fitzgerald performed hits such as "A-Tisket, A-Tasket", which was composed by Van Alexander at Fitzgerald's request. Despite rumors to the contrary, "Ella was not adopted by Webb, nor did she live with him and his wife, Sally," according to Stuart Nicholson in his Fitzgerald biography.

== Declining health and death ==
In November 1938, Webb's health began to decline; however, he continued to play for a time, refusing to give up touring so that his band could remain employed during the Great Depression. Webb disregarded his own discomfort and fatigue, which often found him passing out from physical exhaustion after finishing sets. Finally, Webb had a major operation at Johns Hopkins Hospital in Baltimore in 1939. He died from Pott's disease on June 16, 1939, in Baltimore. Webb's last words were reportedly, "I'm sorry, I've got to go." He was buried in Arbutus Memorial Park, in Arbutus, Baltimore County, Maryland.

Webb's death hit the jazz/swing community very hard. After his death, Ella Fitzgerald led the band until she left for a solo career in 1942, causing the band to break up. Art Blakey and Duke Ellington both credited Webb with influencing their music. Gene Krupa credited Webb with raising drummer awareness and paving the way for drummer-led bands like his own. Webb's thundering solos created a complexity and an energy that paved the way for Buddy Rich and Louie Bellson.

On February 12, 1940, a crowd of about 7,500 people attended a Chick Webb Benefit in Baltimore, Maryland. In attendance were Sally Webb, Chick's widow, his mother Marie Webb, his sister Mabel Porter, Governor Herbert R. O'Conor, Fitzgerald and boxing champion Joe Louis.

== Discography ==
- 1931–39 Stomping at the Savoy (4xCD) (Proper, 2006)
- 1934–41 The Complete Chick Webb & Ella Fitzgerald Decca Sessions (8xCD) (Mosaic, 2013)

== Bibliography ==
- Crease, Stephanie Stein (2023). Rhythm Man: Chick Webb and the Beat that Changed America. Oxford University Press. ISBN 978-0190055691.
