= Violons d'Ingres =

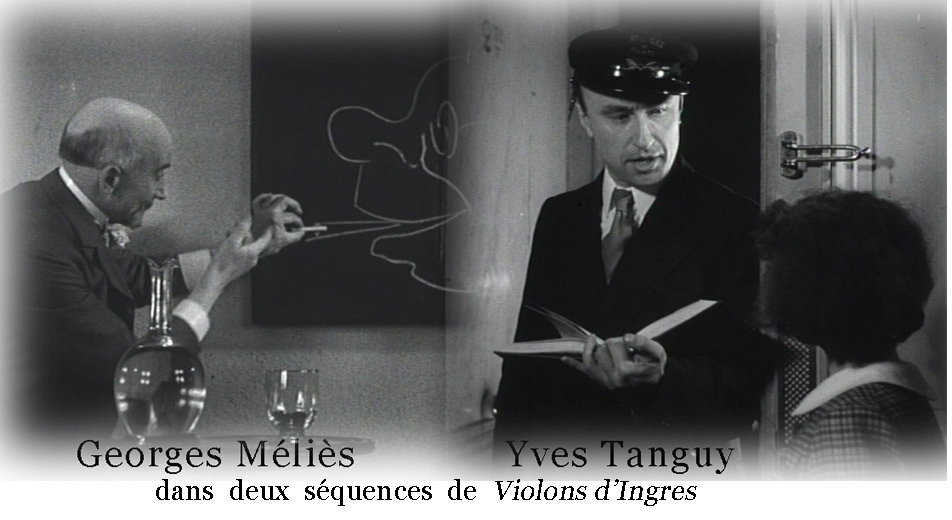
- Directed by: Jacques B. Brunius; Georges Labrousse
- Written by: Jacques B. Brunius
- Starring: Georges Méliès; Yves Tanguy
- Narrated by: Yves Gladine; Agnès Capri
- Cinematography: André Dantan
- Edited by: Brunius and Labrousse
- Music by: Maurice Jaubert
- Release date: 1939
- Running time: 32 minutes
- Country: France
- Language: French

Violons d'Ingres (literally "Violins of Ingres"), released in English-speaking markets as Hobbies Across the Sea and as Creation and Recreation, is a 1939 French short surrealist documentary film directed by Jacques B. Brunius, in collaboration with Georges Labrousse.

== Production ==
Jacques B. Brunius, a French artist active in the Surrealist movement, did much work in the French film industry in the 1930s. In addition to acting onscreen, he assistant-directed feature films, directed short advertisements, wrote film reviews, and made seven documentary films, the last of which was Violons d'Ingres.

The sequence featuring Georges Méliès was directed by Méliès in 1933, as an advertising film for the Régie des Tabacs of France, commissioned by Brunius and Jean Aurenche. The 28-second sequence, a trick film featuring two uses of the substitution splice technique Méliès had made famous, is notable as his final completed work as a film director.

== Style and themes ==
The film is directed and edited in a surrealistic style, freely departing from the representative realism standard for documentary films of the time. The title derives from the French phrase violon d'Ingres, meaning a hobby or avocation; it refers to the celebrated nineteenth-century painter Jean-Auguste-Dominique Ingres, who played the violin for enjoyment. A story goes that, when hosting visitors at his studio, Ingres demanded they listen to his amateur violin efforts rather than study his acclaimed paintings. The film praises hobbyist artistry, inviting the viewer to think of amateur work in terms of childlike creativity and imagination surviving through adulthood.

== Release and legacy ==
Violons d'Ingres premiered at the 1939 New York World's Fair. It was also screened at the Berkeley Art Museum and Pacific Film Archive in 1990, and at the Jihlava International Documentary Film Festival in 2015. It remains the best-known of the seven documentaries made by Brunius. A 2013 essay in the Journal of Film Preservation, highlighting the themes of amateur artistry and of "the survival of the childhood spirit", named it as Brunius's "most personal film".
