= Coordinating Council of Audiovisual Archives Associations =

Professional organization of Audiovisual Archives

The Coordinating Council of Audiovisual Archives Associations (CCAAA) is an umbrella group of international private organizations working on audiovisual archiving. These professional organizations have a common goal of promoting and encouraging the preservation and accessibility of the world's audiovisual heritage. The CCAAA member organisations work with many AV materials including: films, TV, radio, photographs and audio recordings.

== History ==
The Coordinating Council of Audiovisual Archives Associations traces its origins to the Roundtable of Audiovisual Records, which was organized in 1982 in response to the UNESCO report "Recommendation for the Safeguarding and Preservation of Moving Images" (1980). The report called for cooperation and coordination between organizations tasked with preserving the world's audiovisual heritage. The five founding members were the International Federation of Film Archives (FIAF), the International Federation of Television Archives (FIAT/IFTA), the International Federation of Library Associations and Institutions (IFLA), the International Association of Sound Archives (IASA), and the International Council on Archives (ICA). A major early project was organizing a Joint Technical Symposium of preservation experts from around the world, to be held every few years. The first JTS was held in Stockholm in 1983, with later editions in Berlin (1987), Ottawa (1990), London (1995), and Paris (2000). The Roundtable also produced papers on archival matters, and worked closely with UNESCO on audiovisual preservation.

By 1999 it was felt that the Roundtable needed to become more proactive in shaping policy in the audiovisual archive field, to include lobbying for greater preservation efforts worldwide. To accomplish this it was reconstituted as the CCAAA in 2000, and new members were added. The Joint Technical Symposiums continued, with new conferences held in Toronto (2004, 2007), Oslo (2010), and Singapore (2016). The CCAAA was instrumental in the establishment and management of UNESCO's "World Day for Audiovisual Heritage" (observed on October 27 each year), which was approved in 2005 and first observed in 2007. It has also launched an "Archives at Risk" initiative to aid endangered archives, and taken positions on subjects as disparate as the impact of copyright on preservation and access and the repatriation of audiovisual heritage items to originating countries.

Since the CCAAA is an "association of associations," its membership generally consists of the president and secretary general (or equivalent) of each of its member organizations. The presidency rotates among the members, and there is also a secretary general and a treasurer. All positions are filled by volunteers and there is no paid staff.

The current Chair of the CCAAA is Rachael Stoeltje, representing FIAF.

== Joint Technical Symposium ==
The Joint Technical Symposium (JTS) is organised by CCAAA for AV specialists interested in audio-visual, cinema and sound heritage.

== Members ==
- Association for Recorded Sound Collections
- Association of Moving Image Archivists
- International Association of Sound and Audiovisual Archives
- International Council on Archives
- International Federation of Film Archives
- International Federation of Television Archives
- Southeast Asia-Pacific Audiovisual Archive Association
- Federation of Commercial Audio Visual Libraries

== See also ==
- UNESCO Memory of the World
- UNESCO World Day for Audiovisual Heritage
- National Film Preservation Foundation
- Film preservation
- Optical media preservation
- Lost film
- Orphan film
