= Association of Moving Image Archivists =

US non-profit to advance the field of moving image archiving

- AMIA Logo
- Abbreviation: AMIA
- Formation: 1990
- Type: 501(c)(3)
- Legal status: Articles of Association
- Purpose: Professional Body
- Headquarters: Los Angeles
- Region served: Worldwide
- Members: 1,017 (as of Nov, 2015)
- Official language: US English
- President: Andrea Leigh
- Main organ: Board of Directors
- Staff: 7
- Volunteers: 200 approx.
- Website: www.amianet.org

The Association of Moving Image Archivists (AMIA) is a 501(c)(3) not-for-profit organization established to advance the field of moving image archiving by fostering cooperation among individuals and organizations concerned with the acquisition, description, preservation, exhibition and use of moving image materials.

== History ==
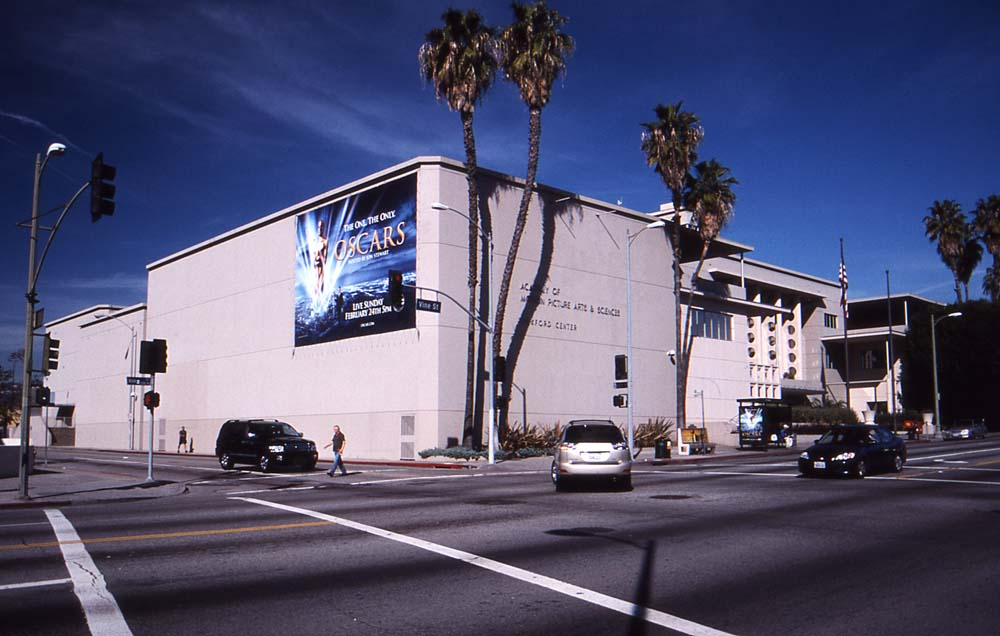
The Academy of Motion Picture Arts and Sciences's Pickford Center for Motion Picture Study, 1313 N. Vine St., Hollywood - Home to the AMIA Office

Since the late 1960s, representatives from moving image archives have recognized the value of regular meetings to exchange practical information and experiences. Over the years, this group of archivists originally known as the Film and Television Archives Advisory Committee (F/TAAC) expanded from a handful of participants to several hundred archivists from over 100 national, regional and local institutions. In 1990, the name of the group was changed to the Association of Moving Image Archivists. In 1991, AMIA voted to formalize as an individual-based member-based professional association, the only one of its kind in the moving image archival field. Although AMIA's office is based in the US, its membership is now drawn from across the world.

== Membership ==
Unlike F/TAAC's free mailing list, AMIA charged dues, and growth was initially slow: in early 1995 membership was around 200, including roughly 30 to 40 institutional members. A Membership Development Committee formed that year became a permanent committee of the board in 1996.Reported membership rose from 266 in 1995 to 419 in 1997 and 576 in 2000, and later peaked at about 1,033. Growth masked heavy turnover: between 2001 and 2003, net membership rose from 633 to 672, though 312 members joined and 273 left.

Membership is open to anyone who has an interest in the preservation of moving images and associated sound recordings: in practice, most of the membership are professional archivists (both public sector and commercial) and people working in associated professions, e.g. librarianship, the film and television industry or academics in related fields. AMIA offers both individual and institutional membership.

== Governing structure ==
AMIA is governed by a Board of Directors, which is elected by the membership on a two-year cycle, and chaired by a president. The Board oversees and ratifies the work of the sub-groups through which the work of the organization is undertaken. The last significant changes to the governing structure were undertaken in 2009, when the present structure of committees and task forces was introduced.

=== Current President ===
- 2026–2027: Andrea Leigh

=== Former Presidents ===
- 2021–2025: Rachael Stoeltje
- 2018–2021: Dennis Doros
- 2016–2017: Andrea Kalas
- 2012–2015: Caroline Frick
- 2009–2011: Wendy Shay
- 2005–2009: Janice L. Simpson
- 2003–2005: Milt Shefter
- 1999–2003: Sam Kula
- 1997–1999: Linda Tadic
- 1996–1997: Andrea Kalas
- 1995–1996: Maxine Fleckner Ducey
- 1994–1995: Eddie Richmond
- 1993–1994: Ernest Dick
- 1992–1993: Chris Horak
- 1991–1992: Bill Murphy

=== Committees and Task Forces ===
AMIA is a volunteer based organization and projects rely on work done by its members in Committees and Task Forces.

Committees of the Board carry out the core management and policymaking functions of AMIA, e.g. running elections and organizing the conference. Chairs are appointed directly by the Board of Directors, and although their members are volunteers drawn from within the wider AMIA membership, the rosters of Committees of the Board have to be approved by the Board.

- Advocacy Committee, Chair(s): Guillaume Boure and Valeria Dávila
- Awards Committee, Chair(s): Andrea McCarty
- Conference and Steering Committee, Chair(s): Leong and Louisa Trott
- Elections and Nominations Committee, Chair(s): Jan-Christopher Horak
- Publications Committee, Chairs(s): Melissa Dollman and Karen Gracy

Committees of the Membership are the bodies through which AMIA's professional presence in the field exists. They develop expertise, advocacy and education in the different topics and activities related to moving image archiving, e.g. preservation, copyright and cataloguing. Their rosters are volunteers from within the AMIA membership, and they elect their chairs directly. As of November 2026, six of the seventeen comittees have gone on hiatus.

- Accessiblity Committee, Chairs(s): Hiatus
- Cataloging and Metadata Committee, Chairs(s): Hiatus
- Copyright Committee, Chairs(s): Jennifer Matz
- Education Committee, Chairs(s): Jen O'Leary Hashida and Felicity Flesher
- Independent Media Committee, Chairs(s): Hiatus
- International Outreach Committee, Chairs(s): Hiatus
- LGBT Committee, Chairs(s): Kristen Muenz
- Magnetic Media Crisis Committee, Chairs(s): Brianna Toth & Libby Hopfauf
- Moving Image Related Materials and Documentation Committee, Chairs(s): Hiatus
- News, Documentary, and Television, Chairs(s): Karen Cariani and Alexis Scargill
- Nitrate Committee, Chairs(s): Rachel Del Gaudio, Amanda McQueen and Oscar Becher
- Open Source, Chairs(s): Annie Schweikert
- Preservation Committee, Chairs(s): Susan Etheridge and Julia Mettenleiter
- Projection & Technical Presentation Committee, Chairs(s): Spencer Christiano
- Regional Audiovisual Archives Committee (RAVA), Chairs(s): Hiatus
- Small Gauge and Amateur Film Committee, Chairs(s): Hugo Ljungbäck, and Agata Zborowska

Task Forces are created by the Board of Directors to carry out a specific projects which does not fall squarely within the remit of an existing committee, and are dissolved on completion of that task. The most recent completed taskforces have been:

- Local Television Task Force (2018-2024)
- Continuing Education Advisory (CEA) Task Force (2018 – 2023)
- AMIA Pathways Fellowship Task Force (2019-2023)

== Annual conference locations ==
- 2026: Pittsburgh, Pennsylvania
- 2025: Baltimore, Maryland
- 2024: Milwaukee, Wisconsin
- 2023: Tulsa, Oklahoma
- 2022: Pittsburgh, Pennsylvania
- 2021 November: Online
- 2021 Spring: Online
- 2020: Online
- 2019: Baltimore, Maryland
- 2018: Portland, Oregon
- 2017: New Orleans, Louisiana
- 2016: Pittsburgh, Pennsylvania
- 2015: Portland, Oregon
- 2014: Savannah, Georgia
- 2013: Richmond, Virginia
- 2012: Seattle, Washington
- 2011: Austin, Texas

=== Archival Screening Night ===
AMIA's Archival Screening Night is a program of film and video clips shown at AMIA's annual conference, in which members present recent acquisitions, discoveries, and preservation efforts from their collections.

== See also ==
- Coordinating Council of Audiovisual Archives Association
- UNESCO Memory of the World
- UNESCO World Day for Audiovisual Heritage
- National Film Preservation Foundation
- Film preservation
- Optical media preservation
- Lost film
- Orphan film
