= Cristóbal Díaz Ayala =

Cuban musicologist, radio producer and lawyer (1930–2026)

- Díaz in 2014
- Born: Cristóbal Héctor Díaz Ayala; June 20, 1930; Cerro, Havana, Cuba
- Died: May 4, 2026 (aged 95); Guaynabo, Puerto Rico
- Education: University of Havana
- Known for: Diaz Ayala Cuban and Latin American Popular Music Collection
- Spouse: Marisa Méndez Rosas (m. 1953)
- Awards: ARSC Lifetime Achievement Award, 2009

Cristóbal Héctor Díaz Ayala (Note: Surname is also cited as Díaz-Ayala and Díaz y Ayala.) (June 20, 1930 – May 4, 2026) was a Cuban musicologist, curator, radio producer and lawyer, known for the Diaz Ayala Cuban and Latin American Popular Music Collection.

== Biography ==
Díaz was born Cristóbal Héctor Díaz Ayala on June 20, 1930, in Cerro, Havana, to a lower middle class family. In 1944, aged 14, Díaz began collecting American music records and at 16 hosted an American music program for Radio Quiza-Seigle. (Note: The program is cited as lasting just under a year and between two or three years.)

He studied at the University of Havana, where he attended the School of Journalism, obtained a degree in social sciences, and graduated from the Faculty of Law. On December 19, 1952, Díaz married María Isabel "Marisa" Méndez Rosas (born 1931) in Havana. (Note: Surname is also cited as Méndez y Rosas and Mendez Rosas y Diaz.)

Díaz and his wife entered Miami on 30 April 1960, before immigrating to Puerto Rico the same year. Díaz was admitted by the Puerto Rican Law Association in 1966. He has published hundreds of articles and more than a dozen books. Among his most prominent works and cited by relevant researchers we can find Música cubana del Areito a la Nueva Trova (1981); Si te quieres por el pico divertir: historia del pregón musical latinoamericano (1988); Música cubana del areito al rap cubano (1993); Cuando salí de La Habana: 1898-1997: cien años de música cubana por el mundo (1998); La marcha de Los Jíbaros 1898-1997 (1998); Cuba canta y baila: discografía de la música cubana, primer volumen: 1898-1925 (1994) y segundo volumen: de 1925 a la actualidad (2005); Los contrapuntos de la música cubana (2006), San Juan-New York: discografía de la música puertorriqueña (2009), Oh Cuba Hermosa Volumen 1 y 2. Díaz has also compiled and published two major selections of the most representative music of Cuba (100 Canciones cubanas del Milenio) and Puerto Rico.

In 2001, Díaz gifted his collection of Cuban and Latin American music to Florida International University. A member of the Association for Recorded Sound Collections (ARSC), Díaz was awarded the ARSC Lifetime Achievement Award in 2009.

Díaz died on May 4, 2026, in Guaynabo, Puerto Rico, aged 95.
