= Milt Shefter =

American archivist (born 2000)

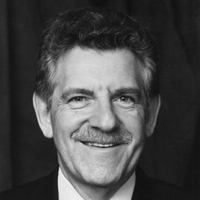
- Milt Shefter, Founder and President of Miljoy Ent. Inc. and 2004 President of Association of Moving Image Archivists
- Born: Reading, Pennsylvania, United States
- Education: Syracuse University
- Occupations: Film archivist and preservationist
- Spouse: Joy
- Parent(s): Bernard and Ann

Milton R. Shefter is a Los Angeles-based film and media-asset archivist and preservationist. He is best known for the creation, design, and management of the extensive Paramount Pictures Asset Protection Program, and for co-authoring the 2007 report from the Science and Technology Council of the Academy of Motion Picture Arts and Sciences, The Digital Dilemma, as well as its 2012 followup, The Digital Dilemma 2.

== Early life and career ==
Shefter was born in Reading, Pennsylvania. He graduated from Syracuse University in New York. He moved to California to work for Consolidated Film Industries, eventually becoming Vice President of CFI's Video Division. He then worked at Bonded Services, an international media storage and distribution company, where he created a computerized tracking system that enabled studios and other content owners to inventory and track their films, television programs, and other moving image assets.

== Paramount Pictures ==
In 1987, Paramount Pictures retained Shefter as Director of Library Resources to build an archive to preserve Paramount's extensive library of motion picture and television programs. Paramount recognized that it needed “asset protection” when it realized that "all its holdings were in Los Angeles, and if a big earthquake came along, it could lose everything."

Shefter created a plan and supervised the design and construction of a new four-story 40,000 square foot archive building on Paramount's Hollywood studio lot, featuring environmentally-controlled vaults. Several hundred thousand cans of film and tape, some dating back to Paramount's inception, were located worldwide, identified, bar-coded, and consolidated in this one central location. Shefter also implemented a “protection-by-separation” strategy for archiving Paramount's valuable and irreplaceable film and video assets. Mirror-image archival vaults were built at an underground facility in Pennsylvania and in London, England. This was the very first motion picture studio worldwide with a total Asset Protection Program.

Shefter has performed similar services for other major studios and other organizations with large libraries of moving images and recorded sound content in the United States and Europe.

== Subsequent preservation work ==
In 1994, Shefter headed the Task Force on Public Awareness for the National Film Preservation Board, which led to the formulation of the NFPB's National Film Preservation Plan. Shefter was also on the original design team for the National Audio-Visual Conservation Center of the Library of Congress, located in Culpeper, Virginia.

Shefter testified before the National Fire Protection Association for revisions in their storage standards on nitrate film. According to his company website, he has also testified as an expert witness on nitrate film for the United States Department of Justice before the United States Court of Appeals for the Federal Circuit in Washington, D.C.

== The Digital Dilemma ==
In 2006, the Academy of Motion Picture Arts and Sciences asked its Science and Technology Council to study the state of digital preservation worldwide. The Council created a Digital Motion Picture Archival Project, and appointed Shefter as its Lead. Together with Andy Maltz, Director of the Council, Shefter co-authored and co-edited The Digital Dilemma, the very first "white paper" from the Academy. Published in November 2007, The Digital Dilemma addressed the effects of digital technology on the motion picture industry.

The Digital Dilemma won the 2008 Outstanding Preservation Publication Award from the Society of American Archivists, the oldest and largest archivist association in North America. As a result of The Digital Dilemma, the Academy partnered with the Library of Congress on the Digital Motion Picture Archive Framework Project.

In 2012, Shefter and Maltz co-authored a follow-up report, The Digital Dilemma 2, produced in partnership with the Academy and the Library of Congress, and focusing more on independent filmmakers and small archives.

== Other achievements and awards ==
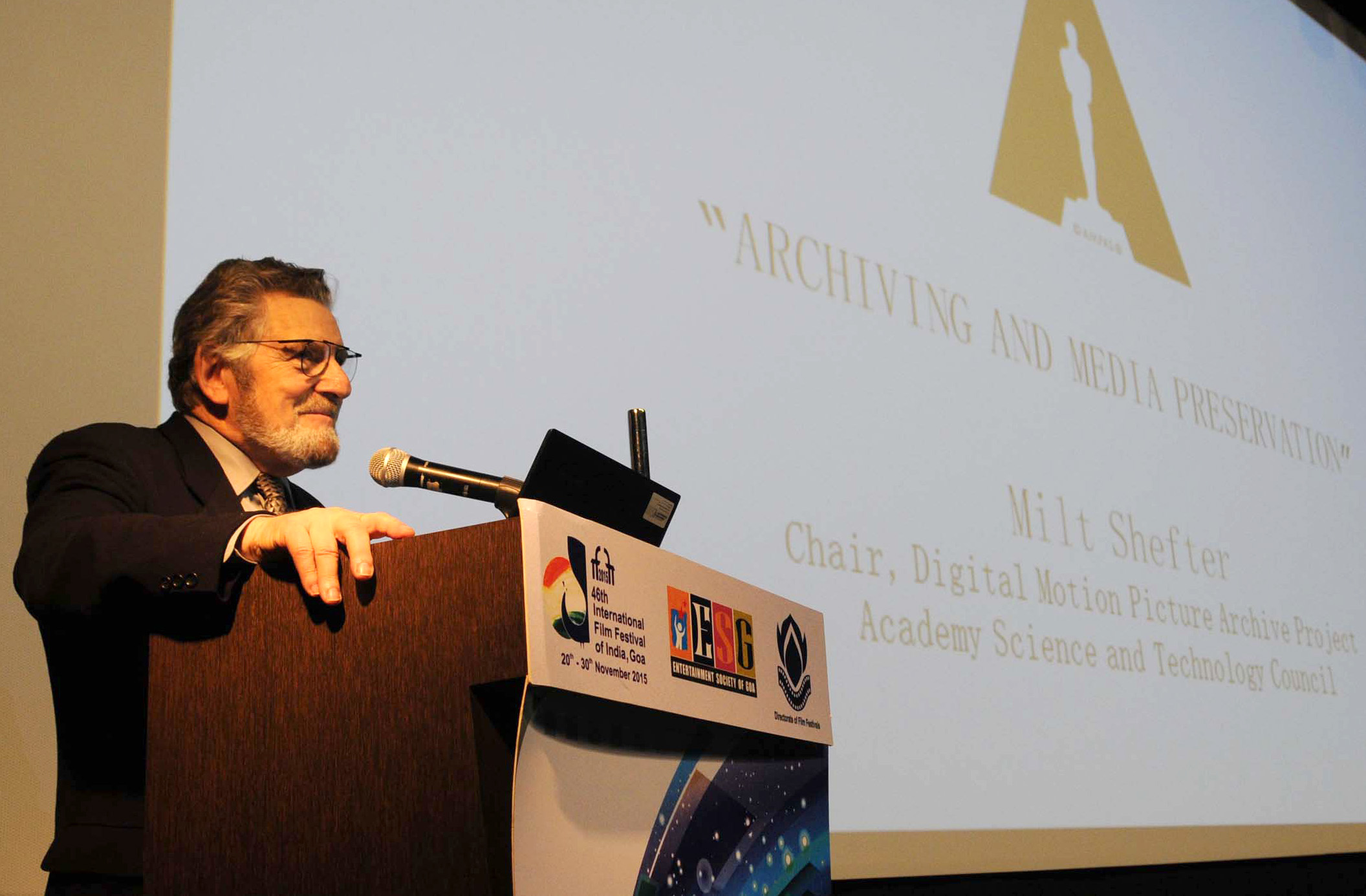
Shefter at IFFI 2015

Shefter is a former Governor of the Society of Motion Picture and Television Engineers. SMPTE has elevated him to Fellow membership status, "awarded to individuals who have, by proficiency and contributions, attained an outstanding rank among engineers or executives in the motion-picture, television or related industries." In 1992, Shefter received SMPTE’s Citation for Outstanding Service to the Society. In 2013, he received The Archival Technology Medal from SMPTE "in recognition of his long-standing and continued leadership contributions to the motion picture and television industry in defining practices for the storage and archive of the industry’s film legacy and digital media content."

Shefter is a past President of the Association of Moving Image Archivists, and served as Chair of the International Coordinating Council of Audiovisual Archives Associations. He served on the Library of Congress's National Film Preservation Board. He is an associate member of the American Society of Cinematographers, and directs and narrates their annual awards show. He is also a member of the Writers Guild of America and of the Academy of Motion Picture Arts and Sciences.
