= National Library of Burkina Faso =

- Bibliotheque Nationale du Burkina
- 12°21′50.94″N 1°31′59.81″W
- Location: Ouagadougou, Burkina Faso
- Established: 1996

Collection
- Legal deposit: Yes

The Bibliothèque nationale du Burkina Faso (transl. National Library of Burkina Faso) is the legal deposit and copyright library for Burkina Faso. It was established on November 6, 1996.

National legislation determines the process of collection and preservation of national documentary heritage, primarily through legal deposit. Laws and regulations also govern the publication of the national bibliography, bibliographic control and the management of ISBNs and ISSNs. According to the United Nations, as of 2014 approximately 34 percent of adult Burkinabés can read.

== See also ==
- National Archives of Burkina Faso

== Bibliography ==
- Marcel Lajeunesse, ed. (2008). "Burkina Faso". Les Bibliothèques nationales de la francophonie (PDF) (in French) (3rd ed.). Bibliothèque et Archives nationales du Québec. OCLC 401164333.
- "Burkina Faso", World Report 2010, The Hague: International Federation of Library Associations, OCLC 225182140, archived from the original on 2019-06-29, "Freedom of access to information". (Includes information about the national library)
