= Journal of Film Preservation =

- Frequency: Biannual
- Publisher: International Federation of Film Archives
- Founded: 1972
- ISSN: 1609-2694

The Journal of Film Preservation (JFP) is a journal published twice a year by FIAF, the International Federation of Film Archives.

== History and profile ==
The journal was founded in 1972. It was published under the title of FIAF Information Bulletin from 1972 to 1993. Initially a newsletter for affiliates of FIAF, it has become over the years a more scholarly magazine, offering a forum for both general and specialised discussions on all theoretical, technical and historical aspects of moving image archival activities around the world. It is a trilingual journal – articles are written in English, French or Spanish, and include summaries in the other two languages. A new design, combined with a more modern editorial content was launched in April 2012 with issue #86. Its current editor is Elaine Burrows.

== See also ==
- List of film periodicals
