= Videolog.tv =

Videolog was a video-sharing website on which users can upload, share, and view videos. It was founded in May 2004 by Ariel Alexandre and Edson Mackeenzy, and became one of the main online video providers from Brazil.

== Popularity ==
In 2006, Videolog made a partnership with the giant Brazilian internet service provider UOL. Videolog is then reported as having 170.000 registered users, 95% from Brazil, and more than 190.000 videos. The report also states figures such as 1.5 million unique visitors per month, 35 million page views and 3.5 million videos accessed on a daily basis.

In November 2010, the partnership ended and Videolog joined the Brazilian news portal R7, from the Record media conglomerate.

R7 reported that since 2010, Videolog received 80 million unique visitors and 250 million videos were accessed.

As of December 2011, Videolog.tv is ranked #300 by Alexa in the list of most accessed websites from Brazil, and #12404 taken into account globally visited websites.

In January 2015 Videolog.tv was closed by its owners.

== Features ==
Videolog permitted users to upload videos limited to 25 minutes and 400 MB, except for the Videologgers PRO which can upload videos irrespective of length, and up to 700 MB.

The player also supported High Definition playback in 1280x720 (720p).

== See also ==
- Comparison of video services
