= Diaz Ayala Cuban and Latin American Popular Music Collection =

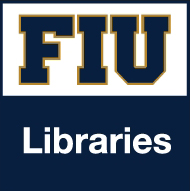
FIU Libraries

The Diaz Ayala Cuban and Latin American Popular Music Collection-FIU, located in the City of Sweetwater, Miami-Dade County, Florida, is a Special Collection of Latin American Music donated to Florida International University Libraries in 2001 by the Cuban musicologist, radio producer and lawyer Cristóbal Díaz Ayala.

== The Collection ==
The Diaz Ayala Cuban and Latin American Popular Music Collection (DAC) is the most extensive publicly available collection of Cuban music in the United States. It was donated to Florida International University Libraries in 2001 by the Cuban discographer and Lawyer Cristobal Diaz Ayala. The archive supports the Florida International University's mission of teaching, research, and service by providing means for the discovery and the pursuit of knowledge. It was started prior to 1960 in Cuba and then restarted in Puerto Rico in 1960. At present the collection comprises approximately 150,000 units.

Format	Records
Books and magazines	5,000
Clippings	18,000
LPs	45,000
78 rpm records	15,000
45 rpm records	2,500
CDs	5,000
Photos	3,000
Videocassettes	2,000
Cassettes	4,000
Sheet music, catalogs, brochures	8,000
Folders("libretas", with chips)and indexes	500
Copies of RCA Victor's recording session history cards	41,000
Billboards and lobby cards of Mexican movies	150

== History ==
This initiative was started prior to 1960 by Mr. Diaz-Ayala. The collection contains more than 150,000 items in total and is currently being expanded. It was recently appraised at over one million of dollars. The materials collected include a variety of formats such as books, LP’s, 78rpm, 45rpm, CDs, photos, videos, cassettes, sheet music, catalogs, RCA Victor cards, and posters, among others. The collection does not only include materials from Latin America musicians but also from artists from all around the world that have a connection to Latin roots.

Rare and valuable items recorded during the pre-revolutionary Cuba are part of the DAC. Under this category, it is possible to find cylinders, pianola rolls, 78 rpm, and rare books. Fragile 78 rpm records have been digitized in order to preserve them and keep them available for academic and research purposes. At the moment, it is possible to retrieve information about all the 78 rpm records as well as part of the Cuban and Puerto Rican LPs recordings through the collection metadata available at DAC website.

More than 350 interviews were incorporated into the DAC collection. Renowned performers, composers, and musicians such as Alfredo "Chocolate" Armenteros, Abelardo Barroso, Bola de Nieve, and Isolina Carrillo are part of these conversations. The interviews contain significant and non-published information about how the groups were created, when and by whom, names and history about music companies, artist’s biographical information, and others. It provides researchers with the opportunity to learn more about personal experiences and anecdotes of the artists, groups, entrepreneurs, etc.

The largest part of the magnetic tape collection corresponds to recordings made from 78’ discs that are not contained in the collection or were never recorded in any other format, not only from Cuban music but also from other Latin American countries. Today, the FIU libraries are trying to fund a project that allows the digitization of magnetic tapes, since most of the tapes have more than 40 years of existence, which places them in a dangerous situation. The risk of demagnetization increases daily, since the estimated tape life expectancy ranges from less than ten years to a couple of decades.

== The Discography ==
Cuba Canta y Baila is a discography written by Cristóbal Díaz Ayala, available online at no cost and without access restrictions. The Discography is organized in alphabetical order by last name. It has been published in two volumes. Volume one contains information related to music and musicians from 1898 to 1925. Volume two includes information from 1925 to 1960. The discography does not only contain a list of discs recorded by specific artists, but also biographic information of performers, musicians, composers, among others.

== Copyright ==
The Sound and Image Department at the FIU Libraries does not claim copyright for any item in the collection. Copies for transmission, broadcast, reproduction, publishing, etc., not covered by fair use, require the written permission of the copyright owners. The user assumes all responsibility for clearing reproduction rights and fees as well as any infringement of United States copyright law (U.S. Code, Title 17) Authorized materials used for publication, exhibition, or display must be credited to "The Diaz-Ayala Cuban and Latin American Popular Music Collection, Florida International University Library". The Sound and Image Department and the FIU Libraries specifically disclaim any and all liability for any loss or damages which may be incurred, directly or indirectly, as a result of the use of the information in the DAC, or for any omissions or errors contained in this collection.
