= Arxivers sense Fronteres =

The Arxivers sense Fronteres (English: Archivists without Borders) (est. 1998) is an organization of archivists headquartered in Barcelona, Spain. It facilitates volunteer efforts to preserve documentary heritage, especially in developing countries.

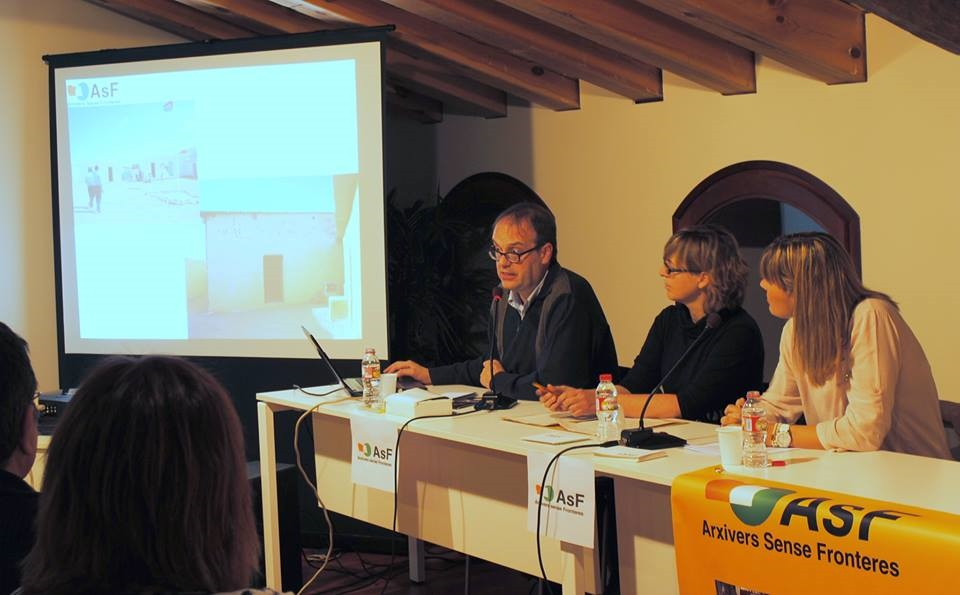
An archival and human rights session in the Sahrawi Republic

== Associated organizations ==
The group coordinates with branch organizations in other countries, such as:

- Archiveros Sin Fronteras Chile (est. 2012)
- Archivistes sans Frontières, France (est. 2005)

== Bibliography ==
- Ramon Alberch; et al. (2003). "Arxivers sense Fronteres, una aposta per la solidaritat arxivística internacional". Lligall. Revista Catalana d'Arxivística (in Catalan) (21). Barcelona. ISSN 1130-5398.
- Jackson Guterres Santos (2010). A arquivística social expressa na Declaração Universal sobre os Arquivos: o caso dos Arquivistas Sem Fronteiras - ASF (Graduação thesis) (in Portuguese). Brazil: Federal University of Rio Grande do Sul. hdl:10183/28447.
