= Hilton Schleman =

English writer (1905–1952)

Henry Hilton Roy Schleman (February 1905 – 10 February 1952) was an English publicity agent, air force officer, editor, and author who wrote on early 20th-century jazz music.

== Early life ==
Born at Bush Hill Park, Middlesex, the only son of Henry Anthony William Schleman (1865–1915), a master mariner, and his wife Nellie Maud Dixon, he was educated at Cranleigh School. His father died in March 1915, when Schleman was ten.

== Career ==
In 1926, Schleman received a short-service commission into the Royal Air Force as a pilot officer.

By 1929, Schleman was editor of the Western Electric Courier and the Western Electric Exhibitor, publications of the Western Electric company. In May 1932, he was appointed as studio press representative of Paramount British Productions. He was later a record company publicity agent for United Artists in London. His book Rhythm on Record: A Complete Survey and Register of All the Principal Recorded Dance Music from 1906 to 1936, and a Who's Who of the Artists Concerned in the Making, which was printed in 1936 by Melody Maker and reprinted in 1978 by Greenwood Press remains a foundational work on early jazz music.

In August 1940, Schleman returned to the Royal Air Force as a pilot officer. In May 1941, he was promoted to Flying Officer.

== Personal life ==
On 15 June 1940, at St Mary Abbots, Kensington, Schleman married Jean Frances Winifred Phyllis Lockhart (1909–1987), known as Freda Bruce Lockhart, a younger sister of the diplomat and spy R. H. Bruce Lockhart and the Indian Army general Rob Lockhart, herself an actress and film critic. There were no children of the marriage.

In May 1946, Freda Bruce Schleman announced in The London Gazette that she had abandoned the name of Schleman. The couple had separated by the time of Schleman's death in February 1952, at 13 Albany Crescent, Edgware, and probate on his estate valued at £6,715 was granted to May MacGregor, single woman. In June 1952, under her maiden name, Freda Bruce Lockhart returned from Cape Town on RMS Andes, giving a different home address, in Holland Park, W8.

== Selected publications ==
Hilton R. Schleman, Rhythm on Record: Who's Who and Register of Recorded Dance Music 1906–1936 (London: Melody Maker, 1936)
