= International Federation of Film Archives =

French organization

- Fédération internationale des archives du film
- Founders: Cinémathèque française; Reichsfilmarchiv; British Film Institute; Museum of Modern Art
- Founded at: Paris, France
- Location: Brussels, Belgium
- Country: France (registered)
- Coordinates: 48°51′24″N 2°21′08″E
- Official Languages: English; French; Spanish

The International Federation of Film Archives (French: Fédération internationale des archives du film, FIAF) is a film preservation organization founded in Paris in 1938 by the Cinémathèque Française, the Reichsfilmarchiv in Berlin, the British Film Institute and the Museum of Modern Art in New York City. As of March 2026, it consists of 186 member institutions in 80 countries.

== List of FIAF presidents (1938–present) ==
	Name	Term	Nationality
1	John E. Abbott	1938-1939	United States
2	Frank Hensel	1939-?	Germany
3	Iris Barry	1946–1947	United Kingdom
4	Jerzy Toeplitz	1948–1972	Poland
5	Vladimir Pogačić	1972–1979	Yugoslavia
6	Wolfgang Klaue	1979–1985	Germany
7	Anna-Lena Wibom	1985–1989	Sweden
8	Robert Daudelin	1989–1995	Canada
9	Michelle Aubert	1995–1999	France
10	Iván Trujillo Bolio	1999–2003	Mexico
11	Eva Orbanz	2003–2009	Germany
12	Hisashi Okajima	2009–2011	Japan
13	Éric Le Roy	2011–2017	France
14	Frédéric Maire	2017–2023	Switzerland
15	Peter Bagrov	2023–present	Russia

== Affiliates ==
FIAF's members are archives that are actively engaged in the activities and fully committed to the ideals described earlier. Current members reflect a wide range of non-profit institutions, including government archives, independent foundations and trusts, self-contained cinematheques, and museum or university departments.

FIAF's Associates are non-profit institutions that support the goals of the Federation but are not involved in film preservation per se. In this way, FIAF is joined by moving image museums, videotheques, documentation centres, and so on.

== Activities ==
Much of the work of FIAF takes the form of active cooperation between members on projects of mutual benefit or interest - for example, the careful restoration of a particular film, or the compilation of a national or international filmography. The more visible activities include the annual congress, publications and the work of the specialist commissions.

The Annual Congress FIAF meets every year in a different country. The Congress combines a General Assembly at which the formal business of the Federation is transacted with a programme of symposia and workshops on technical or legal aspects of film archive work and on aspects of film history and culture. The final congress of Fiaf was held in Budapest on 24–29 April 2022.

The Specialized Commissions The Commissions are groups of individual experts from affiliated archives who meet regularly to pursue work programmes that promote and assist in the development and maintenance of standards at both the theoretical and the practical level. The three FIAF Commissions are the Cataloguing and Documentation Commission, the Technical Commission, and the Programming and Access to Collections Commission.

== Publications ==
FIAF publishes the Journal of Film Preservation twice a year. A special office compiles and publishes the International Index to Film Periodicals and the FIAF International FilmArchive Database. Publications also include an annual bibliography of members' publications, the proceedings of symposia or workshops, the results of surveys and reports, manuals and discussion papers prepared by the specialist Commissions and the results of other FIAF projects.

- Journal of Film Preservation
- International Index to Film Periodicals
- FIAF Databases
- FIAF Bulletin Online
- Film Atlas

== Relations with international organisations ==
FIAF has always had an active international profile. It was closely involved in the preparatory work for the UNESCO Recommendation for the Safeguarding and Preservation of Moving Images, approved in Belgrade in 1980. In pursuit of the goals of the Recommendation, the Federation facilitates contacts between developing archives and older archives to make sure that experience is passed on. The Federation is a member of the Coordinating Council of Audiovisual Archives Associations (CCAAA).

== Education ==
Training of archive personnel takes place at FIAF Summer Schools and Technical Symposia that have been held several times in various countries. Their aim is to introduce participants to the necessary skills of preservation, cataloguing, documentation and even administration.

== FIAF Award ==
The FIAF Award celebrates an individual – external to the FIAF archival community – whose experience in the field of cinema underlines the objectives and goals of the Federation.

The FIAF Award was created in 2001, and has since then been presented to the following figures:

- Martin Scorsese (2001)
- Manoel de Oliveira (2002)
- Ingmar Bergman (2003)
- Geraldine Chaplin (2004)
- Mike Leigh (2005)
- Hou Hsiao-hsien (2006)
- Peter Bogdanovich (2007)
- Nelson Pereira dos Santos (2008)
- Rithy Panh (2009)
- Liv Ullmann (2010)
- Kyōko Kagawa (2011)
- Agnès Varda (2013)
- Jan Švankmajer (2014)
- Yervant Gianikian and Angela Ricci Lucchi (2015)
- Jean-Pierre Dardenne and Luc Dardenne (2016)
- Christopher Nolan (2017)
- Apichatpong Weerasethakul (2018)
- Jean-Luc Godard (2019)
- Walter Salles (2020)
- Amitabh Bachchan (2021)
- Tilda Swinton (2022)
- Guillermo del Toro (2023)
- Wim Wenders (2024)
- David Woodley Packard (2025)
- Ardiouma Soma (2026)

== See also ==
- Cinematheque
- List of film archives
- Association of European Film Archives and Cinematheques
- Coordinating Council of Audiovisual Archives Association
