= International Council on Archives =

Industry organization based in France

- International Council on Archives
- Founded: June 9, 1948; 78 years ago
- Type: Professional Organization
- Purpose: Archivists, Archive Conservators & Record Managers
- Location: Paris, France
- Method: Industry standards, Conferences, Publications
- Website: www.ica.org

The International Council on Archives (ICA; French: Conseil international des archives; Spanish: Consejo Internacional de Archivos) is an international non-governmental organization which exists to promote international cooperation for archives and archivists. It was set up on 9 June 1948, with Charles Samaran, the then director of the Archives nationales de France, as chairman, and membership is open to national and international organisations, professional groups and individuals. In 2024, it grouped together about 2,000 institutional members in 149 countries and territories. Its mission is to promote the conservation, development and use of the world's archives.

ICA has close partnership links with UNESCO, and is a founding member of the Blue Shield, which works to protect the world's cultural heritage threatened by wars and natural disasters, and which is based in The Hague.

== Mission statement ==
ICA's mission statement reads: "The International Council on Archives (ICA) is dedicated to the effective management of records and the preservation, care, and use of the world's archival heritage through its representation of records and archive professionals across the globe. Archives are an incredible resource. They are the documentary by-product of human activity and irreplaceable witness to past events, underpinning democracy, the identity of individuals and communities, and human rights. But they are also fragile and vulnerable. The ICA strives to protect and ensure access to archives through advocacy, setting standards, professional development, and enabling dialogue between archivists, policymakers, creators, and users of archives. The ICA is a neutral, non-governmental organization, funded by its membership, which operates through the activities of that diverse membership. For over sixty years ICA has united archival institutions and practitioners across the globe to advocate for good archival management and the physical protection of recorded heritage, to produce reputable standards and best practices, and to encourage dialogue, exchange, and transmission of this knowledge and expertise across national borders."

== History ==
In the aftermath of World War II, preserving historical records became a global priority. Governments, archivists, and international organizations recognized that safeguarding archives was essential to ensuring historical continuity amid geopolitical shifts and post-war recovery. The establishment of the International Council on Archives (ICA) arose from these collective efforts, driven by the need to manage archival materials across borders. With support from UNESCO and other key partners, the ICA evolved into a cornerstone institution, advancing archival practices and fostering international cooperation.

The ICA emerged in response to global challenges following the Second World War, rooted in the need to safeguard and manage archival materials across borders. During its initial stages between 1945 and 1950, the ICA’s foundation was shaped by three significant pressures: collaboration with the United Nations Archives, the development of a specialized archival program under UNESCO, and the establishment of an international organization for archivists. These efforts arose from concerns about the preservation of vital historical records, as war and territorial shifts raised uncertainties about the fate of many nations’ archives. With support from UNESCO, the ICA became a key player in promoting international cooperation for restoring and advancing archival services, especially in territories impacted by military occupation and post-war reorganization. The Society of American Archivists, alongside other international organizations, played a collaborative role in laying the groundwork for the ICA’s mission to ensure archives’ accessibility and sustainability across geopolitical boundaries.

Recognizing the need for inclusivity, the ICA also prioritized extending support to underrepresented regions and marginalized groups. Through various initiatives, it facilitated the development of archival infrastructure in countries with fewer resources, helping build sustainable archives where such efforts were previously limited. The ICA encouraged the sharing of best practices among archivists from diverse backgrounds, offering training and technical assistance to areas facing post-colonial challenges or recovering from conflict. This commitment to inclusivity reflects the organization’s belief that safeguarding cultural heritage and collective memory requires a global effort, ensuring that smaller or vulnerable communities are not left behind.

The ICA formally coalesced during the 1940s and 1950s, evolving to meet shifting global needs. Initially, the organization faced challenges in asserting its authority on the international stage and securing consistent funding. However, financial backing from partners like UNESCO enabled the ICA to pursue technological developments crucial to modern archival practices, which became particularly necessary in the 1970s and 1980s. The overarching objective of the ICA has remained focused on elevating archival administration standards globally, allowing institutions to better manage their collections and ensure historical continuity. The organization’s evolution exemplifies how unforeseen developments—such as the post-war restructuring of societies—required archivists to adapt and innovate to meet new challenges, cementing the importance of the ICA as a guardian of collective memory in an increasingly interconnected world.

== Organization ==
The ICA is organized in thirteen regional branches with varying levels of activity, including the Caribbean branch (CARBICA), the Eastern and Southern Africa branch (ESARBICA), the South and West Asian branch (SWARBICA), the European branch (EURBICA) and the Pacific Region branch (PARBICA). The North American branch (NAANICA) operates "virtually" and by contributions to meetings of the Society of American Archivists and the Association of Canadian Archivists. ICA has twelve professional sections, which provide much of the organization's archival content and activity, including the Section for Archival Education (SAE), the Section for Archives and Human Rights (SAHR), the Section for Architectural Records (SAR), the Section for Business Archives (SBA), the Section for Archives of Literature and Art (SLA), the Section for Local, Municipal and Territorial Archives (SLMT), the Section on Sports Archives (SPO), the Section for Archives of Parliaments and Political Parties (SPP) and the Section for University and Research Institutions (SUV).

It is based in the Marais quarter of the 3rd arrondissement of Paris, rue des Francs-Bourgeois, in the premises of the French national archives.

Member groups include the Arxivers sense Fronteres, among others.

== Activities ==
ICA publishes a review Comma, which appears once or twice a year and includes material in United Nations languages as well as German.

Every fourth year, ICA hosts its major International Congress. In recent years, these have been held in Vienna (2004), Kuala Lumpur (2008), Brisbane (2012) and Seoul (2016), and Abu Dhabi (2023; delayed from 2020 by the COVID-19 pandemic). Until 2011, ICA also hosted the annual meetings of CITRA, the International Conference of the Round Table on Archives, which brought together heads of national archival institutions, presidents of national professional associations, and the ICA sections, branches, and committees. The last three CITRA meetings were held in Malta (2009); Oslo, Norway (2010) and Toledo, Spain (2011). After the CITRA in Toledo, ICA replaced CITRA meetings with an annual conference. The first three annual conferences were in European venues: Brussels (2013), Girona (2014) and Reykjavík (2015). These were followed by annual conferences in Mexico City in 2017, Yaoundé in 2018, Adelaide in 2019, and Rome in 2022, before the delayed four-yearly Congress in Abu Dhabi in 2023 and a further Congress in Barcelona in 2025.

=== ISAD(G) ===
In 1993, the International Council on Archives approved the first draft of ISAD(G) (General International Standard Archival Description), intended to be a standard for elements that should be included in a finding aid register for archival documents produced by corporations, persons and families.

A revised version, known as ISAD(G)2, was issued in 2000.

=== President ===
Josée Kirps (2022-2026)

== See also ==
- International Standard Archival Authority Record
- Records in Contexts
- List of archives
- Coordinating Council of Audiovisual Archives Association
