= Optical media preservation =

Practice to keep optical discs accessible

The preservation of optical media is essential because it is a resource in libraries, and stores audio, video, and computer data. While optical discs are generally more reliable and durable than older media types, (magnetic tape, LPs and other records) environmental conditions and/or poor handling can result in lost information.

== Types of media ==
The two broad types of optical discs are Compact Discs (CDs) and DVDs. Data is retrieved by both CDs and DVDs by devices that focus a laser light beam against the reflective layer allowing data to be read. The data layer, supported by the polycarbonate substrate can be metallic or dye-based, depending on the disc type.

The reflective and data layers of CDs are just below the label and a thin sheet of polycarbonate substrate. A much thicker layer of the substrate supports and protects the bottom of the disc. The reflective and data layers of double-sided DVDs are in the center of the disc structure, housed between two equal layers of polycarbonate substrate. Because the data layer of CDs is more exposed than double-sided DVDs, a thin lacquer layer is used to protect the surface of the CD. The top of a CD is delicate and fragile; the bottom is merely a transparent protective covering.

For preservation purposes: Gold CD-R (Compatible Disc-Recordable) and DVD-R (Digital Video Disc-Recordable or Digital Versatile Disc-Recordable) discs are preferred by experts over aluminium and silver for reliable long-term backup storage—the reflective layer of the optical disc is gold.

Permanent and long-term storage are distinct. “[D]igital archiving experts commonly acknowledge that no carrier is permanent. Instead, one must maintain data transferred to storage and provide access and ensure integrity of the information for the long-term.” As technology changes data can be migrated from an older to a newer type of media to avoid media failure or “format obsolescence”—a real threat for technology when it is no longer supported. If the machine required to play and read the discs is not kept in working order and maintained, data loss may result. Risks involved with optical media are covered below.

Issues which affect data longevity of nominally archival-grade discs include the following: dye failure (discs with premium organic and pthalocyanine-based long-life dyes are more suitable); bonding failure (premium bonding agents and edge-to-edge coverage improve longevity); scratches, minimised by careful handling and a scratch-resistant coating; production quality (some factories have better quality control standards, and discs from a batch known to be good may be more reliable than another batch). Testing is required since conditions vary from machine to machine and from disc to disc; environmental control is required to prevent damaging conditions. When these conditions are met it is believed that the life of an archival-quality CD-R or DVD-R can be as long as 100 years, compared to the typical five to ten years for non-archival quality optical discs. The ISO 9660 standard specifies a stable room temperature of 18–23 °C (64–73 °F) with relative humidity of 30% to 50%. Keeping multiple copies of discs is necessary for added protection. “One Master, stored under optimal conditions, one Working copy to be used for access purposes or copying, and one Safety copy to be stored at a different location.” According to the Institute of Conservation the container most suitable for storage is a rigid high-quality case made from inert polyester placed vertically.

There is still speculation on how reliable optical media is. There are no accepted standards for blank discs and recording devices, so acceptable performance cannot be relied upon. The longevity of rewritable formats—CD-RW, DVD-RAM, DVD-RW and DVD+RW—is less well known; they are also susceptible to accidental overwriting.

== Optical disc types ==
CD-ROMs/DVD-ROMs (read-only-memory) are commercial grade discs and use a metallic data layer created using a molding machine that stamps pits (depressions) and lands (flat surfaces) into a polycarbonate substrate base. The metal layer is then applied to the base, creating the data layer. While aluminium is most frequently used, it can potentially oxidize and lose data, a process sometimes called "disk rot". For archival discs, silver or gold layers are preferred because of longer life expectancies and better reflectivity. DVD-ROMs can also support a double layer of data, using two metal layers, one semi-reflective and the other fully reflective. Laser light beams can read the two layers separately. If both sides of a DVD are used, double-layer technology provides four data layers.

CD-Rs/DVD-Rs (recordable) are recordable, write-once discs which use photosensitive organic dye just below the reflective layer; the dye undergoes a chemical change when exposed to specific laser light beams, creating bits (marks) containing data.

Dyes used in DVD-Rs and CD-Rs include Phthalocyanine (greenish) Cyanine (blue) and Azo (dark blue). Silver, silver alloys and gold are used as reflective layers on recordable CDs and DVDs. Both gold and silver will outlast the organic dyes, which will decay over time. Aluminium is not used because it may cause reactions with the dyes.

CD-RW/DVD-RWs (rewritable) are recordable, erasable and re-recordable discs that use a phase changing film data layer that reacts to heat. Laser light beams melt bits into the film to create data. These bits can be erased and re-recorded by adjusting the temperature of the laser. Rewritable CDs and DVDs usually use aluminium reflective layers, because the phase changing film degrades faster than aluminium oxidizes.

Blu-ray Discs/HD DVDs represent a new generation of optical media. Both disc types use unique blue-violet laser beams to read data, and are not compatible with equipment for other formats. Blu-ray Discs and HD DVDs are incompatible, and were engaged in a format war until Toshiba announced its discontinuation of the HD DVD format on February 19. 2008. The structure of HD DVDs is similar to normal DVDs, with the data layer protected by layers of substrate on each side. The structure of Blu-ray discs is more similar to CDs, with the information stored directly beneath the surface. Early Blu-ray discs were easily damaged, but a protective layer that made them less delicate was developed.

== Damage to optical discs ==
Optical discs are not subject to wear as they are read without mechanical contact with the surface, but are susceptible to scratches from handling. The risk of scratching is minimised by handling discs only by their edges and the center hole or hub. Machines used to read discs can damage them if mechanically faulty.

=== Scratches ===
==== Scratches on the laser-reading side of an optical disc ====
Data recorded on discs has redundancy, so that error detection and correction can compensate for some degree of damage. The depth and width of scratches as well as the direction in which scratches on the bottom run all determine whether or not the data on the optical disc will be readable. Small scratches on the substrate generally have no effect on the readability of a disc as the laser is reading through the substrate to the data layer. If a scratch is deep or wide enough to affect laser focus, error correction is usually possible, but scratches can be too deep and wide or too close together for error correction to be successful. If a scratch runs along a track or is deep enough to scratch the data layer, data may be lost.

==== Scratches on the top of an optical disc ====
Because a CD's reflective metal layer and data layer are both directly beneath the thin lacquer surface of the label, data can be destroyed by even a small scratch on the top of a CD. The instrument used to label CDs should be seriously considered. Pens or markers with hard tips, or with solvents that can affect the protective layers, can scratch or damage the data layer; water-based felt-tip pens are safest. The data layer of a double-sided DVD is in the middle of the disc, surrounded by the substrate on both sides so scratches to either side are equivalent.

=== Environmental considerations ===
Optical discs can be damaged by exposure to extreme temperatures; direct sunlight may overheat the disc or damage the data layer with UV rays. Exposure to heat and light have different effects on discs with data and metal layers of different composition. In all optical discs high temperatures can cause the substrate to soften and the disc to warp. Ambient heat, heat build-up, and light do little to damage the data layer of a ROM disc as it is made of aluminium; the only known problem occurring with the prolonged exposure of ROM discs to light is "clouding" or "coloring" of the polycarbonate substrate. CD-R, DVD-R, DVD+R, CD-RW, DVD-RW, DVD+RW and DVD-RAM discs are all affected by exposure to ambient heat as well as heat build-up due to direct sunlight. A CD-R's data layer is made of dye that degrades at high temperatures, becoming less transparent so that pits and lands are read incorrectly, making the data unreadable. UV rays in sunlight are energetic enough to produce a photochemical reaction that changes the optical properties of the dye. RW and RAM discs' data layers are composed of a phase-changing film that is even more sensitive to heat than the dye found in R discs, so that they degrade even faster when subjected to ambient heat or direct sunlight. The phase-changing film in RW and RAM discs is not light-sensitive, and UV rays do not affect the optical properties of the film. After being exposed to freezing temperatures a disc's separate layers may warm at different speeds, causing separation of the layers. If heated or cooled significantly a disc should be allowed to return to room temperature before use.

The polycarbonate substrate of discs exposed to high humidity or immersion may absorb some water, and should be allowed to dry out in a less humid environment before being used. After drying discs should be usable unless minerals left behind from the water react with the components of the disc, damaging the layers and making it unreadable, as sometimes happens.

== Disc quality scanning ==
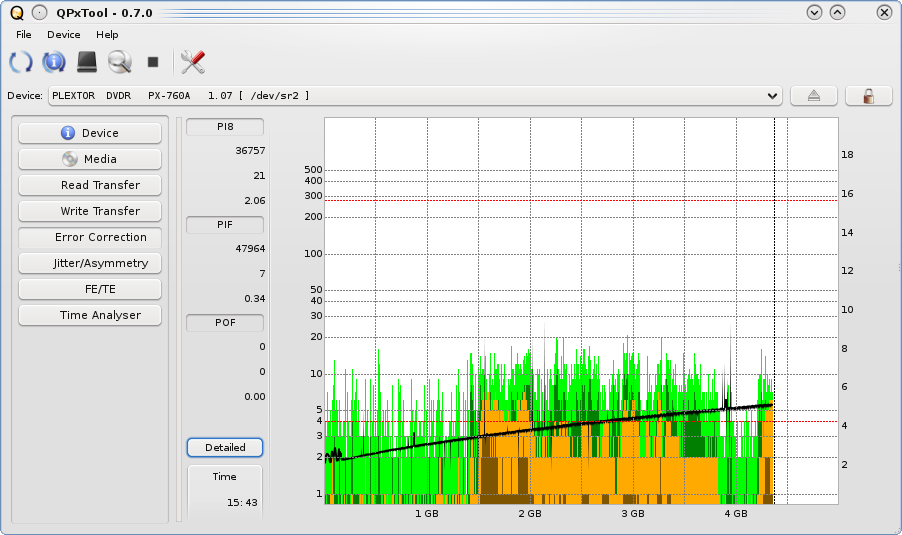
Error rate measurement on a DVD+R. The error rate is still within a healthy range.

By measuring the rate of correctable data errors, potential future data losses caused by media degradation can be predicted.

Types of correctable data errors include so-called C1 (also known as E31) and C2 errors (also known as E32) on CDs, and Pairity Inner Errors (PIE), Pairity Inner Failures (PIF) and Pairity Outer Errors (POE) on DVDs, while uncorrectable errors are CU (or E32) on CDs and Pairity Outer Failures (POF) on DVDs.

A high rate of errors may also be caused by scratches and dirt on the surface, low quality media, recording speeds incompatible with the specific media, and data written using a malfunctioning optical drive.

Too many consecutive smaller data errors could lead to data loss. Due to the weaker error correction used on Audio CDs and Video CDs than on data CDs, a C2 error already represents data loss.

Support for error scanning does vary among vendors and models of optical drives.

== Cleaning of optical discs ==
Optical media discs often require professional preventative or routine cleaning to ensure data accuracy and accessibility; those with no professional experience may scratch the disc surface in their attempt to clean the disc. Build up of dust and oily contaminants on the disc surface, and fingerprints can typically impede the laser beam's ability to penetrate the substrate to read the data layer, and more often impede writing. Minor interferences with reading is handled by error correction technology. If an audio CD (with a much lower accuracy threshold than a data disc) becomes dirty, it can be cleaned safely with a dry, soft lint-free cloth, holding the disc by the edges or by the center hole. Light dirt that is not removed by this method can be removed with a cloth dampened with water or a suitable optical disc-cleaning fluid. It has been advised that excess dust be blown off an optical disc before reading, to avoid buildup of dust in the reader, particularly on the laser.

== Storage of optical discs ==
Individual storage containers protect optical discs from scratches and dust. It has been recommended that discs be stored vertically, if possible in a cabinet or drawer less susceptible to changes in temperature or humidity. For long-term storage it has been advised that any paper inside the case—liner, booklet—be removed to minimise the collection and retention of moisture inside the case.

== Repair and reclamation of data from optical discs ==
If scratches on the laser-reading side of an optical disc prevent it from being read, it may be possible to recover all or most of the content once, and transfer it to another storage medium. There are software packages that analyse data on a damaged storage medium and can recover some or all otherwise inaccessible information. Commercial companies offer data recovery services.

Also, the disc itself can be repaired. There are various machines that will repair discs by polishing, buffing or grinding the playable surface. Usually the disc will appear like new and most importantly the data can once again be read by the laser. Some game shops, pawnbrokers and supermarkets provide a disc repair service. However, since this is an ablative process in which a layer of the substrate is removed, it is only safe to do a few times before risking the loss of the whole disc.

== See also ==
- M-DISC (DVD and Blu-Ray for long term digital preservation)
