= Audiovisual archive =

Archive that contains audio-visual materials

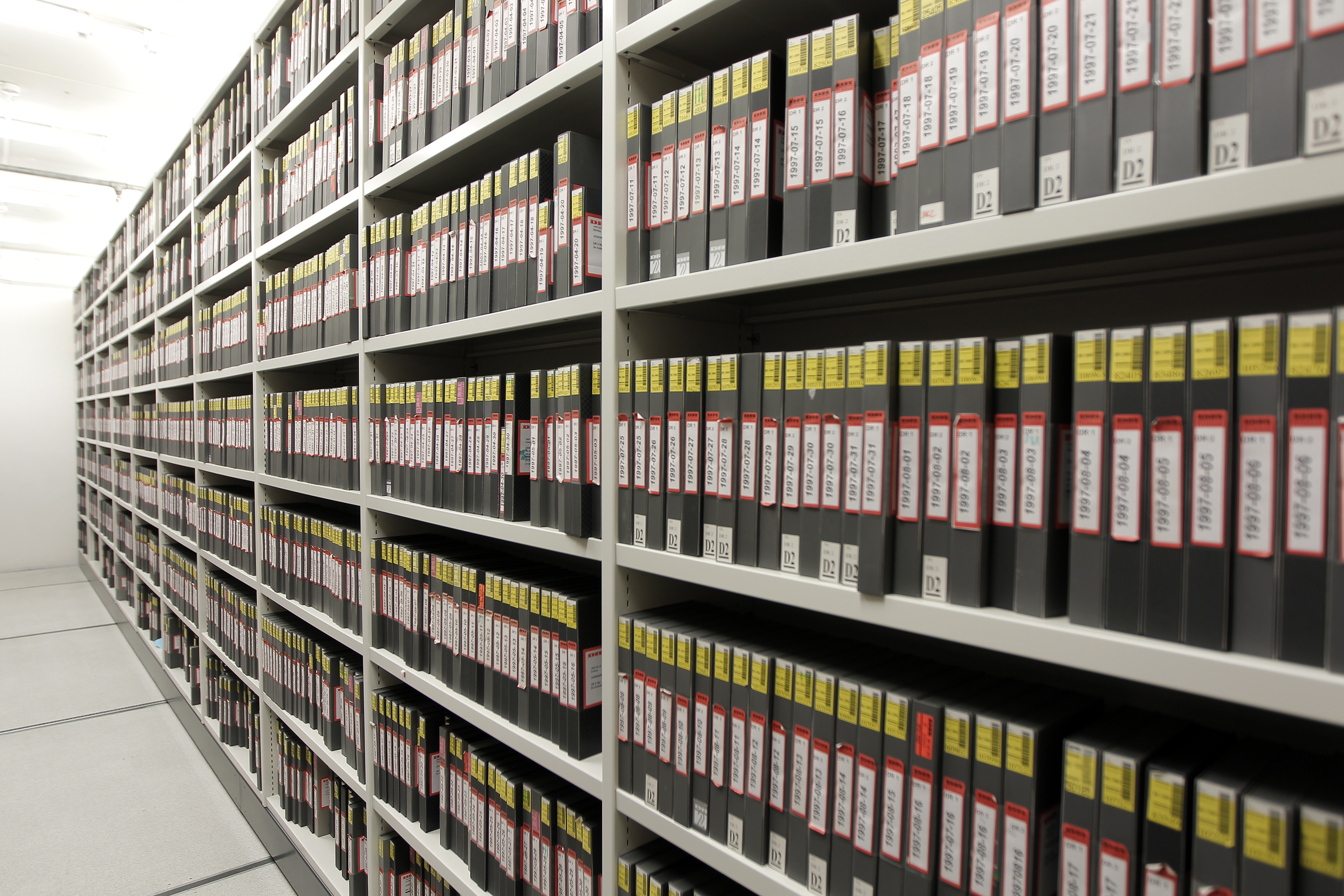
Video tape Archive

An audiovisual archive is concerned with the preservation and access to films, videos, audio recordings, images, television, radio, and other audio and visual media, rather than written documents. In addition to media, it distinguishes itself from other forms of archiving by having its tradition of theory, a body of research, principles, vocabulary, and unique skills, as well as specific sets of standards to follow. Changes in technology create challenges with cost, access, preservation, and training.

== History ==
The first audiovisual archives began in the early 20th century. In the second half of the century, technology and formats proliferated, requiring distinct archival practices, standards, and means of access on a global scale.

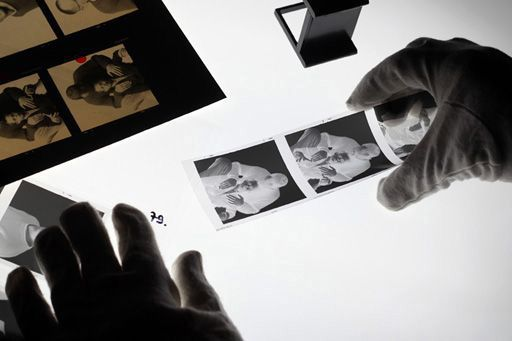
Andreas Bohnenstengel Negative

== Importance ==
There is an ongoing conversation about audiovisual archiving existing as a distinct field. The Audiovisual Philosophy and Principles document from UNESCO cites practitioners coming from film, television, and radio rather than established archival training programs as a unique characteristic of audiovisual archivists. Scoped training, certificates, and specialized degrees help make an argument that it is a distinct discipline. Providing access and preservation for audiovisual archival material is "no less important, and in some contexts more important, than other kinds of documents or artifacts."

== Challenges ==
As with any kind of archiving, challenges exist with preservation and access. More unique to audiovisual archiving, the diversity of audiovisual materials, both in digital and physical formats, adds a layer of complexity.

Another challenge is "an exponentially growing literature base is now beyond the capacity of any one individual to master comprehensively." Whereas archives were largely physical items, the transition to digitized, partly digital, and born-digital works has introduced complications to the field. A proliferation of standards has both helped address these complications and entrench them further.

Concerns like the fragility of physical material, copyright, and persistent development of new digital formats provide additional obstacles for audiovisual archives. Large-scale data management and preservation can be expensive and technically challenging.

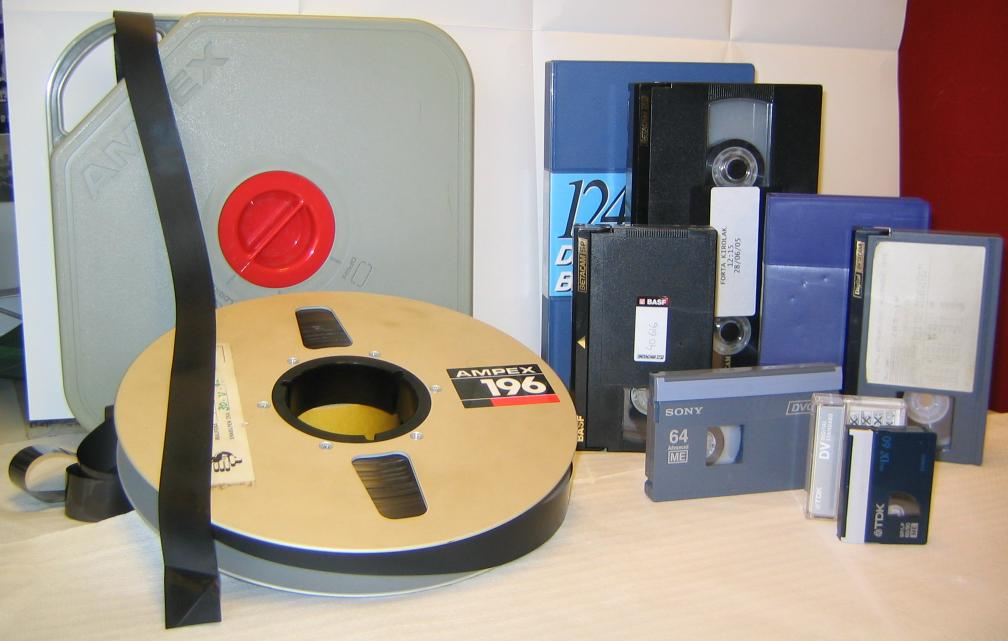
Assorted video tapes

== Principles ==
Similar to other archives, but modified for specific media, audiovisual archives follow similar principles. Some of these principles are:

- provenance: the origin of the record in the collection
- order: preserving the order and arrangement of audio and visual records as they were created or used
- access and use: balancing accessibility for research and education while respecting legal and ethical constraints like copyright and privacy
- preservation: safeguarding audiovisual materials through digitization, storage, restoration, and maintenance
- technology integration: staying current with technologies to ensure the continued usability of digital formats and tools for managing and accessing collections

== Standards ==
Audiovisual archives follow standards and models for consistency, interpretability, clarity, and efficiency. These standards commonly include:

- SMPTE The Society of Motion Picture and Television Engineers Timecode: a standard for synchronizing audio and video, including physical interfaces for transmission of television signals and related data, color bars, test card patterns, the material exchange format (MXF), among other standards
- Material Exchange Format (MXF): MXF is a standard file format for the interchange of audio and video material
- PBCore: Developed by the Public Broadcasting Preservation Fellow project, PBCore is a metadata standard specifically designed for audiovisual materials in public broadcasting archives
- FADGI (Federal Agencies Digitization Guidelines Initiative): FADGI provides guidelines and standards for digitization and preservation of audiovisual materials, especially for government agencies
- PREMIS (Preservation Metadata: Implementation Strategies): PREMIS is a metadata standard for digital preservation, including audiovisual content
- OAIS (Open Archival Information System): The OAIS model is a reference model for digital preservation, helping organizations manage, preserve, and provide access to their audiovisual archives
- METS (Metadata Encoding and Transmission Standard): METS is a standard for encoding descriptive, administrative, and structural metadata about objects within digital libraries, which can be applied to audiovisual materials
- Encoded Archival Description (EAD): While primarily used for textual materials, EAD is often adapted for audiovisual collections, providing a standardized way to encode finding aids
- Dublin Core: is a standardized set of metadata vocabulary for describing digital or physical resources.

Standards like these can assist with the management and sharing of records in audiovisual archives. They can help ensure an archive's compatibility, accessibility, and long-term preservation of records over time.

== Formats ==
=== Video ===
Digital preservationists require specific file type information to make the best decisions for long-term digital preservation. The following formats have been recommended for images, audios, and video files: JPEG 2000, TIFF, FLAC, MP3, Wave, Broadcast Wave, Digital Cinema Package (DCP), Motion JPEG 2000, MPEG-2, MPEG-4.

The Library of Congress releases a Recommended Formats Statement every year, which includes a list of recommended and acceptable formats that are most ideal for preservation and future access. The 2023-2024 preferred video formats are Interoperable Master Format (IMF), FFV1 (Matrovska .mkv wrapper), ProRes, MPEG-2, and XDCAM. In the 2023-2024 Recommended Formats Statement, the FFV1 format was upgraded from an "acceptable" to a "preferred" format for video.

== See also ==
- Archival informatics
- Archival research
- Archival science
- Archive file
- Archivist
- Archives management
- Audiovisual
- International Council on Archives
- Manuscript processing
- National Archives and Records Administration
- Preservation (library and archival science)
- List of Sound Archives
- List of Film Archives
