= Association of European Cinematheques =

International cinema archives affiliation

The Association of European Cinematheques (French: Association des Cinémathèques Européennes, ACE) is an affiliation of 49 European national and regional film archives founded in 1991. Its role is to safeguard the European film heritage and make these rich audiovisual records collected and preserved by the various film archives accessible to the public. ACE is a regional branch of FIAF Fédération Internationale des Archives du Film / International Federation of Film Archives. ACE members are non-profit institutions committed to the FIAF Code of Ethics.

== History ==
European film archives have been collecting, preserving, and restoring films and other materials relating to films since the 1930s. The collections range from pre-cinema apparatus to digital cinema files, all of which require specific methods, techniques and an extensive knowledge of film history for preservation.

In 1991, representatives of 31 main European film archives came together to create LUMIERE, a pan-European film restoration project. It was the first large-scale film restoration project funded by the MEDIA I Programme of the European community. The LUMIERE project lasted between 1991 and 1996, during which more than 1000 film titles were preserved and restored, 700 films were re-discovered and identified and a Joint European Filmography (JEF) was established.

ACE started in 1991 as the Association des Cinémathèques de la Communauté Européenne (ACCE). By the end of the LUMIERE project in 1996, the association renamed to its current title, Association des Cinémathèques Européennes (ACE), and established collaboratively its role in raising awareness of the cultural and economic value of European film heritage among policymakers and the audiovisual industry.

Operating on the European level, ACE also represents the interest of its members in the European Union. ACE works to support and improve the economic and legal conditions, as well as technical and scientific research for digitization and long-term film preservation.

== ACE members ==
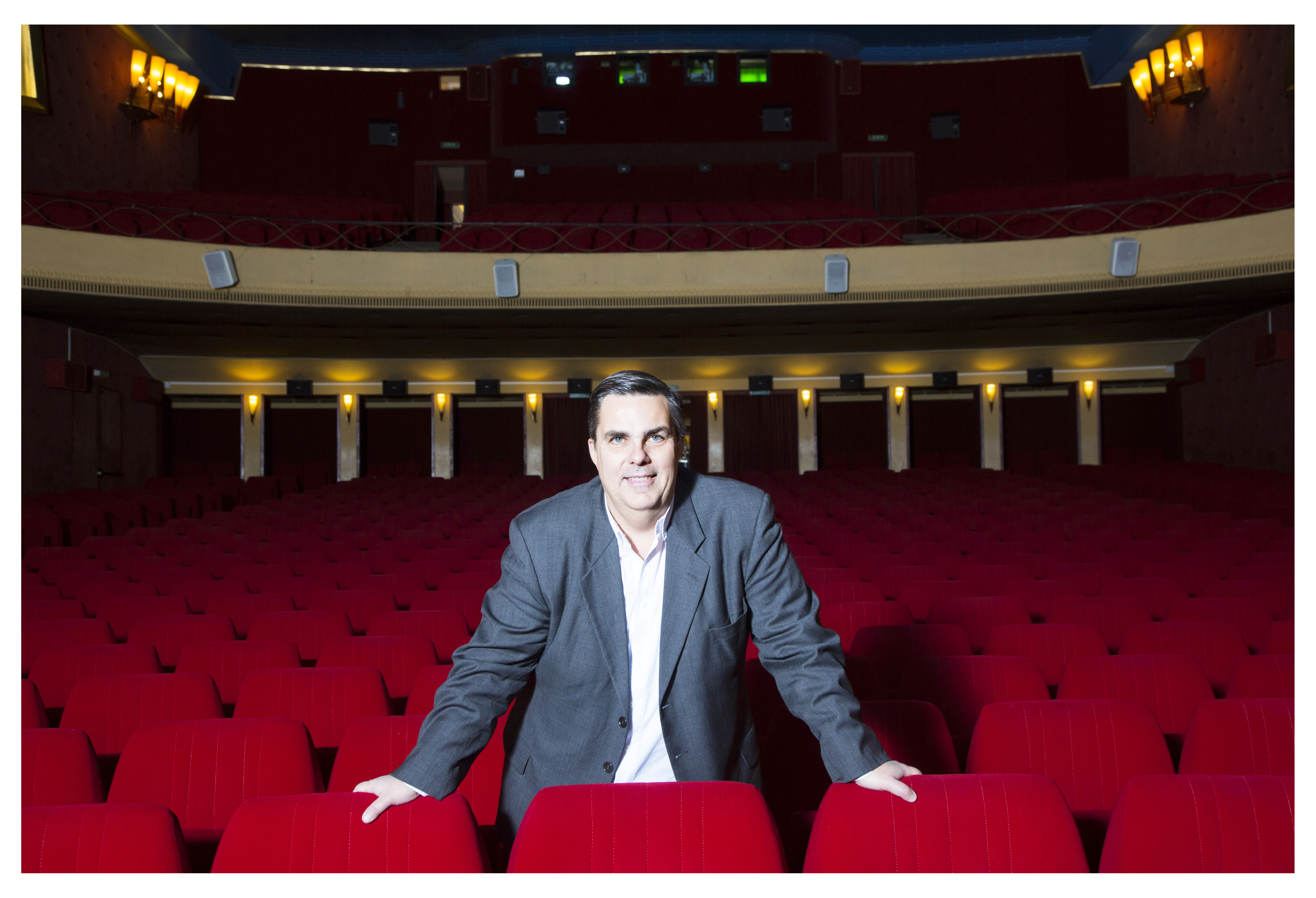
The director of the Swiss Film Archive, in the Cinéma Capitole (2015)

ACE is an affiliation of 49 national and regional European film archives:

1. Eye Filmmuseum, Amsterdam
2. Greek Film Archive, Athens
3. Filmoteca de Catalunya, Barcelona
4. Filmske novosti, Belgrade
5. Yugoslav Film Archive, Belgrade
6. German Federal Archives, Berlin
7. Deutsche Kinemathek, Berlin
8. Kinemathek Bern, Bern
9. Centre national du cinéma, Bois d’Arcy
10. Fondazione Cineteca di Bologna, Bologna
11. CINEMATEK, Brussels
12. Arhiva Națională de Filme, Bucharest
13. National Film Institute Hungary – Film Archive, Budapest
14. Danish Film Institute, Copenhagen
15. Irish Film Institute, Dublin
16. DFF – Deutsches Filminstitut & Filmmuseum, Frankfurt
17. La Cineteca del Friuli, Gemona
18. National Audiovisual Institute (Finland), Helsinki
19. Swiss Film Archive, Lausanne
20. Cinemateca Portuguesa – Museu do Cinema, Lisbon
21. Slovenski filmski arhiv, Ljubljana
22. Slovenska kinoteka / Slovenian Cinematheque, Ljubljana
23. British Film Institute, London
24. Imperial War Museums, London
25. La Cinémathèque de la Ville de Luxembourg, Luxembourg
26. Filmoteca Española, Madrid
27. Fondazione Cineteca Italiana, Milan
28. Gosfilmofond, Moscow
29. Filmmuseum München, Münich
30. National Library of Norway, Oslo
31. Norwegian Film Institute, Oslo
32. Cinémathèque Française, Paris
33. Crnogorska Kinoteka, Podgorica
34. Czech Film Archive, Prague
35. Cineteca Nazionale, Rome
36. Kinoteka Bosne i Hercegovine, Sarajevo
37. Cinematheque of Macedonia, Skopje
38. Bulgarian National Film Archive, Sofia
39. Swedish Film Institute, Stockholm
40. Film Archives of the National Archives of Estonia, Tallinn
41. Central State Film Archive (Albania), Tirana
42. La Cinémathèque de Toulouse
43. National Museum of Cinema, Turin
44. Filmoteca Valenciana – Institut Valencià de Cultura, Valencia
45. Vatican Film Library, Vatican
46. Filmarchiv Austria, Vienna
47. Austrian Film Museum, Vienna
48. Filmoteka Narodowa – Instytut Audiowizualny, Warsaw
49. Croatian state archive – Croatian cinematheque, Zagreb

== Protection of film heritage in Europe ==
The European Commission directly supports efforts to protect Europe's film heritage. The legal basis for action is Article 167 of the TFEU (Treaty on the Functioning of the European Union), which encourages member states to support the conservation and safeguard of the cultural heritage, including film heritage. The Film Heritage Recommendation 2005 invites the member states to systematically collect, catalogue, preserve, and restore Europe's film heritage.

== Projects ==
ACE has initiated several film heritage projects funded by the European Union:

- LUMIERE (1991–1996), supported by MEDIA I programme.
- All the Colours of the World. Colours in early mass media 1900-1930 (1996–1997). Supported by KALEIDOSCOPE.
- Search For Lost Films (1997–1999), supported by RAPHAEL.
- FAOL – Film Archives On Line (1997–2000). Creation of web-based learning tools in the field of film preservation/restoration. Supported by LEONARDO.
- ARCHIMEDIA (1997–2004). European training network for the promotion of cinema heritage, supported by MEDIA II.
- FIRST – Film Restoration and Conservation Strategies (2002–2004). Research project on the application of digital techniques to film heritage. “Film Archives on the Threshold of a Digital Era”: Technical Issues from the EU FIRST Project. FIAF Journal of Film Preservation n° 68, 12/2004. IST - 5th Framework Programme.
- MIDAS – Moving Image Database for Access and Re-use of European Film Collections (2006–2009). The web portal Filmarchives online gives access to catalogue information from film archives all over Europe.
- EDCINE – Enhanced Digital Cinema (2006–2009): Research and development of applications for storing, managing and distributing digitised archival films (IST 6th Framework Programme).
- EN 15744 and EN 15907: Cinematographic works standards on the interoperability of film databases (2005–2010). The standardization work was mandated in 2005 by the European Commission and delegated to CEN (European Committee for Standardization).
- The European Film Gateway (2008–2011). The EFG Portal gives access to digitised films and film related material held in European film archives (eContentplus Programme).
- EFG1914: World War I Film digitisation project (2012–2014), supported by the ICT-Policy Support Programme.
- FORWARD: Framework for an EU wide Audiovisual Orphan Works Registry (2013-2016). The project develops a system for assessing the rights status of audiovisual works and a registry of orphan film compliant to the Directive 2012/28/EU. The project is co-funded by the ICT-Policy Support Programme.
- ABCinema is a joint project of Europeana film archives and film education organisations to share best practices and new approaches in film literacy.
- A Season of Classic Films (2019–today): a series of free screenings across Europe to raise awareness of the work of European film archives, with many new digital film restorations presented by the ACE participating film institutions - supported by the EU Creative Europe programme.
- ArteKino Classics (2022-today): a partnership between ARTE and ACE to make European films and cinema history more visible and accessible to greater audiences by presenting a diverse programme of films by European archives.
