= Freddy Buache =

Swiss journalist, cinema critic, and film historian (1924–2019)

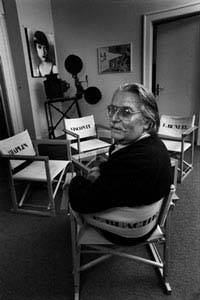
Freddy Buache in 1987

Freddy Buache (29 December 1924 – 28 May 2019) was a Swiss journalist, cinema critic and film historian. He was the director of the Swiss Film Archive (a foundation for the conservation and study of films and cinematography) from 1951 to 1996. He was a privatdozent at the University of Lausanne.

== Biography ==
He was born in Lausanne, Switzerland, spending his early childhood in Villars-Mendraz, where his parents ran the Café de la Poste. The family moved to Lausanne in 1933, where Buache later attended the Collège Scientifique. A meeting with Henri Langlois in 1945 at an international cinema conference in Basel led to the start-up with other film enthusiasts of Lausanne's first film club in 1946.

In 1948 Buache and Charles Apothéloz made a stage adaptation of a film script by Jean-Paul Sartre entitled Les Faux Nez (The False Noses) for the Société de Belles-Lettres. It was performed by Apothéloz' amateur theatre company at the Théatre de l'Atelier, Lausanne, on 22 and 23 June 1948 as a competition entry. Buache played the part of the Prince. Apothéloz' company took its name "La Compagnie des Faux-Nez" from the play, and the underground former wine-cellar which housed their plays when the company turned professional is still called "Le Caveau des Faux-Nez".

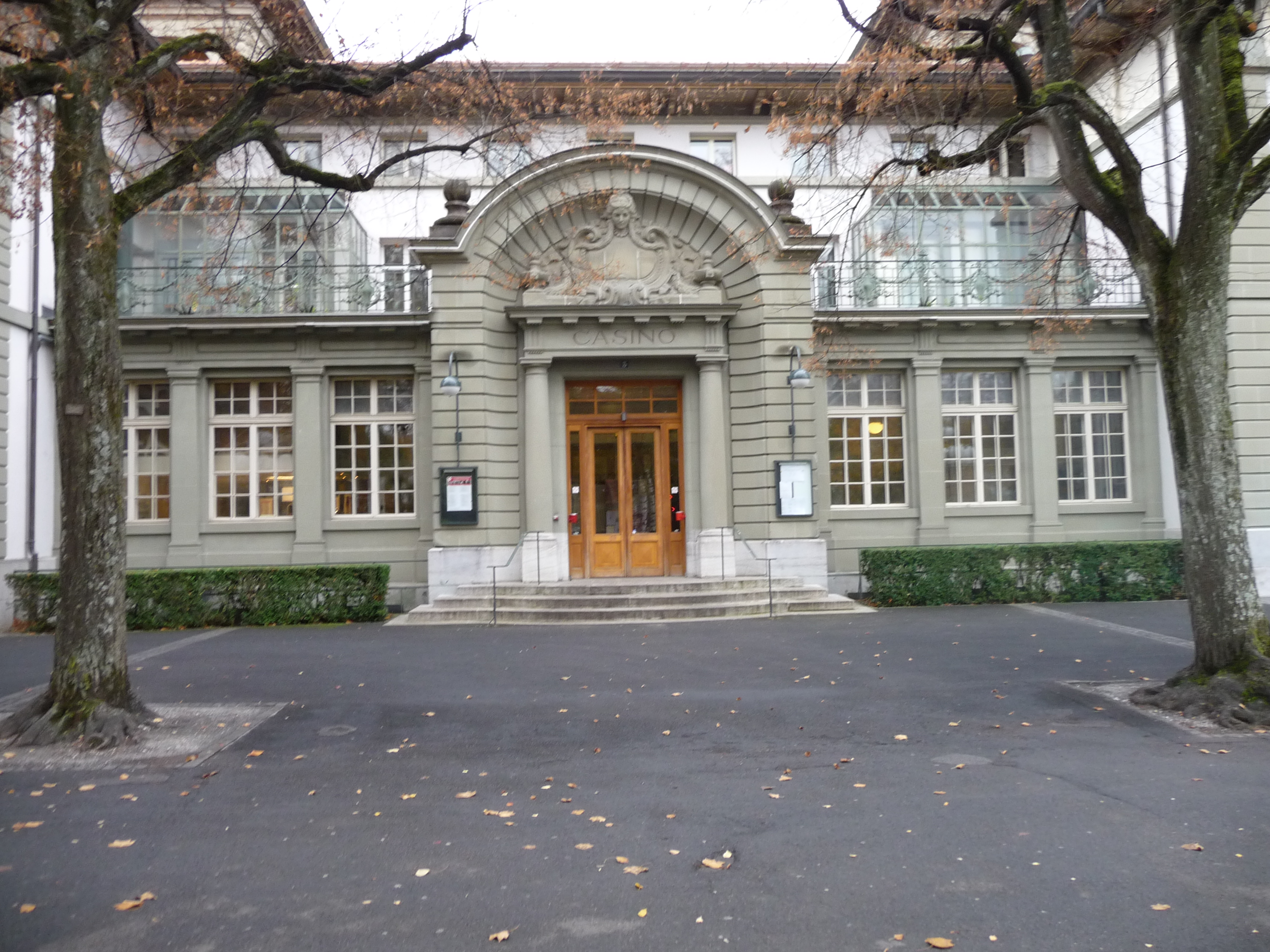
The Swiss Film Archive's headquarters in Lausanne, at the Casino de Montbenon

As an independent journalist Buache wrote the "Cinema" column for the Nouvelle Revue de Lausanne between 1952 and 1959, and from 1959 for the Tribune de Lausanne which later became Le Matin. His continuing contacts with the founders of the Cinémathèque Française, Henri Langlois and the film director Georges Franju, resulted in an equivalent Swiss institution: Buache was one of the ten co-founders in 1950 of the Swiss Film Archive (fr:Cinémathèque Suisse), a foundation for the conservation and study of films and cinematography. He was the director from 1951 to 1996 and afterwards the president of its council. His successor was Hervé Dumont, who inherited some 65,000 copies of films amassed during Buache's time as director.

From 1967 to 1970 Buache was the co-director with Sandro Bianconi of the Locarno International Film Festival, and the second head of the jury at the 1973 Berlin International Film Festival.

== Political views ==
In 1955 Buache was a contributor to the short-lived Marxist review Clartés along with Roland Barthes and others. He was also sympathetic to the Algerian independence movement, showing a number of films by the Provisional Government of the Algerian Republic (GPRA) at the Swiss Film Archive (to an invited audience). In the somewhat conservative Swiss political atmosphere of the 1950s and early 1960s, his reviews of East German films at the 1964 Karlovy Vary International Film Festival attracted attacks in right-wing journals such as the Bulletin National d'Information accusing him of "abject bias, insincerity and vulgarity". In a 1987 interview, he hoped that he continued to hold left-wing views.

== Personal life ==
He married the French journalist and art critic Marie-Magdeleine Brumagne (8 July 1920 – 10 November 2005); they first met in 1951. He died in May 2019 at the age of 94.

== Books ==
Buache wrote a number of books in French about films and the cinema. At least one has been translated into English:

- Buache, Freddy; Graham, P. (trans.) (1973). The cinema of Luis Bunuel. International Film Guide Series (reprint). London: Tantivy Press. ISBN 0-498-01302-2.

For a more complete list of his books, see the French Wikipedia article.

== Film appearances ==
In Jean-Luc Godard's 1987 film King Lear, Buache plays the uncredited part of Professor Kozintsev (usually incorrectly given as 'Professor Quentin'). (Note: The usual name assigned to Buache's role is 'Professor Quentin'; but this is a mis-heard transcription of the name of Grigori Kozintsev, director of the 1971 USSR film King Lear. Godard's film (which contains no on-screen credits at all) includes an excerpt from the sound-track of Kozintsev's version shortly after Buache's only appearance. The name 'Professor Quentin' was apparently propagated by the subtitles for the original Italian video release of the Godard film. Much of the film's soundtrack is deliberately difficult to hear.)

He appeared in À la recherche du lieu de ma naissance (1990) directed by Boris Lehman.

Buache provided the voice-over for Lettre a Jean-Luc Godard (2007), a collaborative project with four cinéastes of a younger generation (Annie Aubergier, Nicolas Costanzo, Pierric Favret & Sarah Richit). The 6-minute film, a homage to the Nouvelle Vague style of Jean-Luc Godard, is an epistolary reply (albeit 25 years late) to Godard's 1982 short film Letter to Freddy Buache.

== Awards ==
- 1985 Prix de la Ville de Lausanne (not to be confused with the ballet award)
- 1996 Prix Maurice Bessy, Cannes Film Festival
- 1998 Léopard d'honneur, Locarno International Film Festival. (Note: Although all the other recipients of the prize since its inception have been cinematic directors, its awarding to Buache as a critic, conservator and writer singled out his contribution to the New Wave and to Swiss cinema.)

== Cultural references ==
A Letter to Freddy Buache is an elegiac short documentary 1982 film by Jean-Luc Godard set in Lausanne, dealing with the slow dissipation of the impetus behind the Nouvelle Vague. Buache does not appear in the film.

== See also ==
- Cinema of Switzerland
- Swiss Film Archive
