= Historical Archive of Bitola =

- Историски архив на Битола (Macedonian)
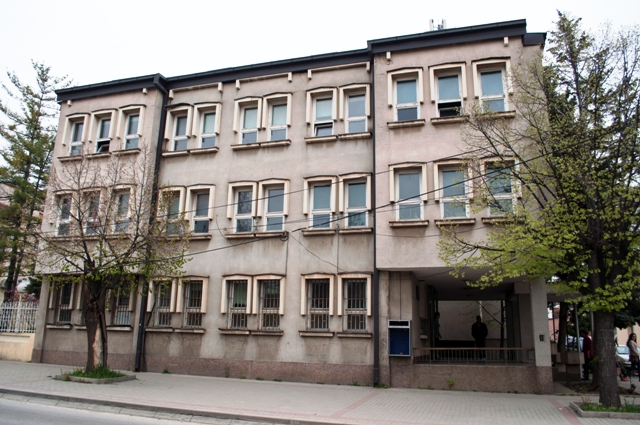
- building housing the archive

Agency overview
- Formed: 1954; 72 years ago
- Jurisdiction: Government of North Macedonia
- Headquarters: Prvi Maj br. 55, 7000 Bitola, North Macedonia
- Parent agency: State Archives of the Republic of North Macedonia

The State Archive of the Republic of Macedonia - Department Bitola (Macedonian: Државен архив на Република Македонија - Одделение Битола, romanized: Državen arhiv na Republika Makedonija - Oddelenie Bitola), more commonly known as the Historical Archive of Bitola (Macedonian: Историски архив на Битола, romanized: Istoriski arhiv na Bitola) is the primary institution responsible for preservation of archival materials in the City of Bitola and Pelagonia Statistical Region.

== History ==
The archive was established on May 26, 1954, by the decision of the then People's Committee of Bitola County, initially as a local institution under municipal jurisdiction.

Since 1990 the archive formally function as a regional centre of the State Archives of the Republic of North Macedonia. In 2024 an event was held commemorating the 70th anniversary of the institution at which a monograph titled "70 Years of the Bitola Archival Chronotope" was presented.

== Gallery ==
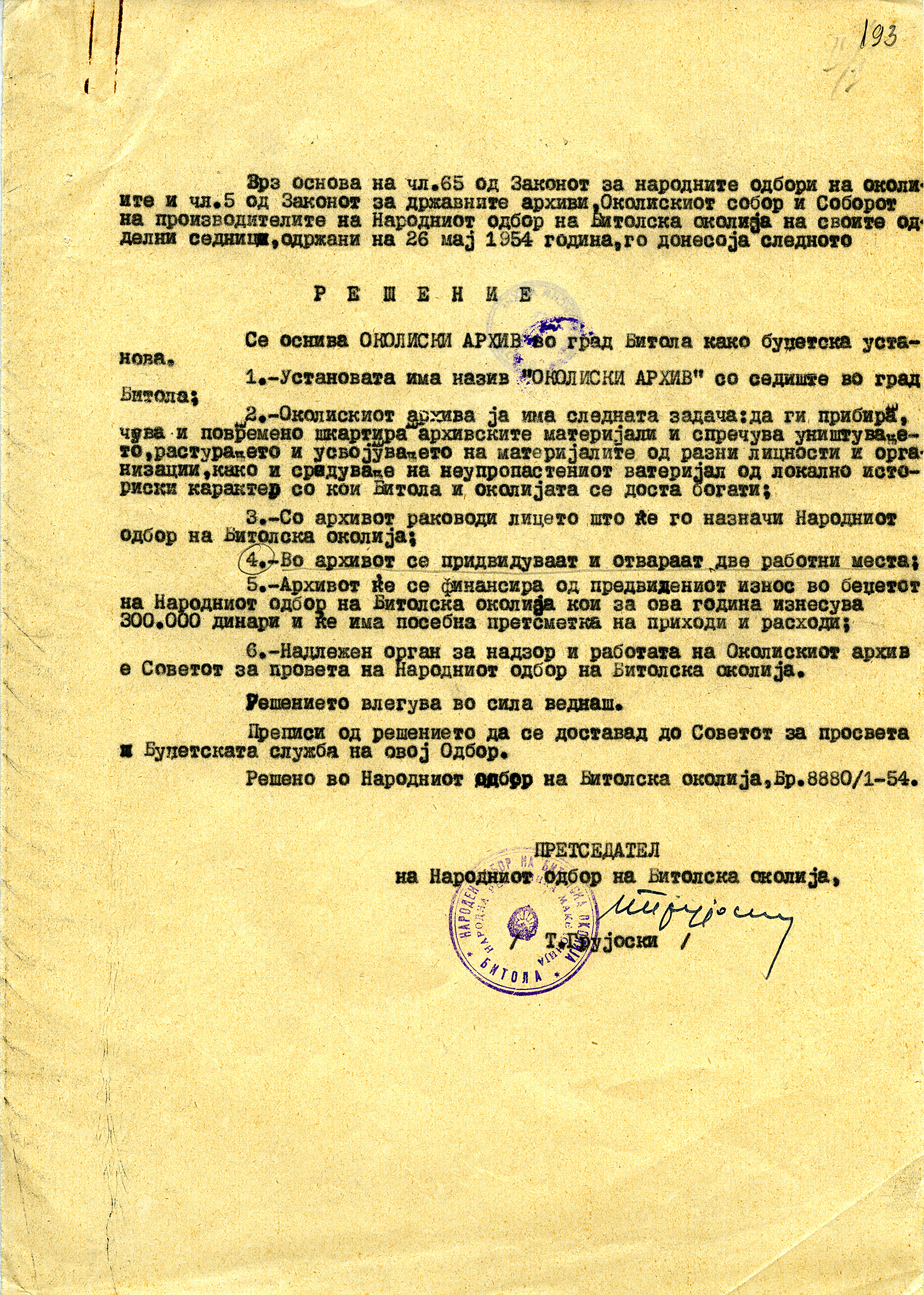
1954 Decision on the establishment of the archive

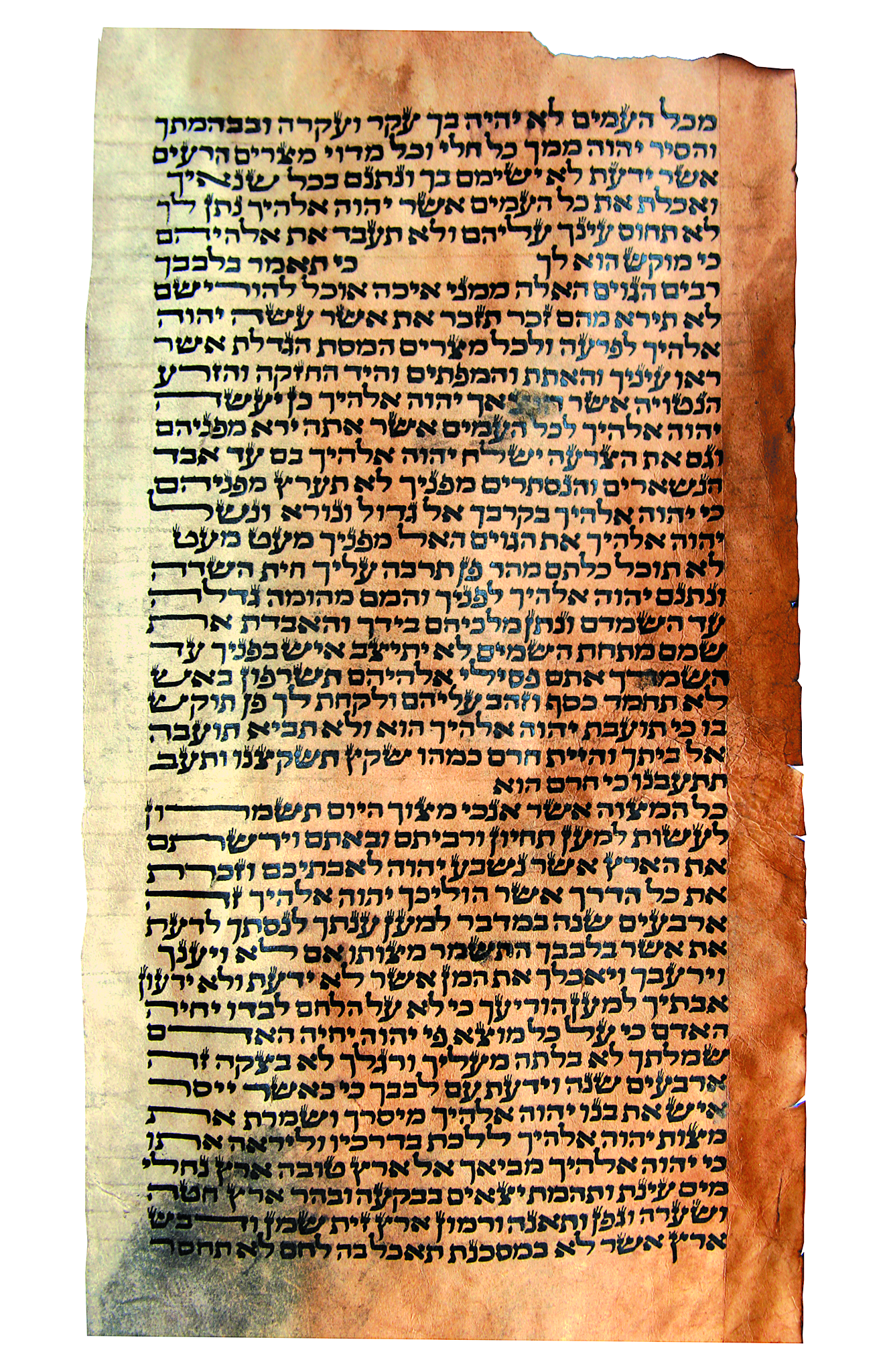
Medieval Hebrew document kept at the archive

== See also ==
- List of archives in North Macedonia
