= Festival cinémas d'Afrique Lausanne =

European film festival on Africa

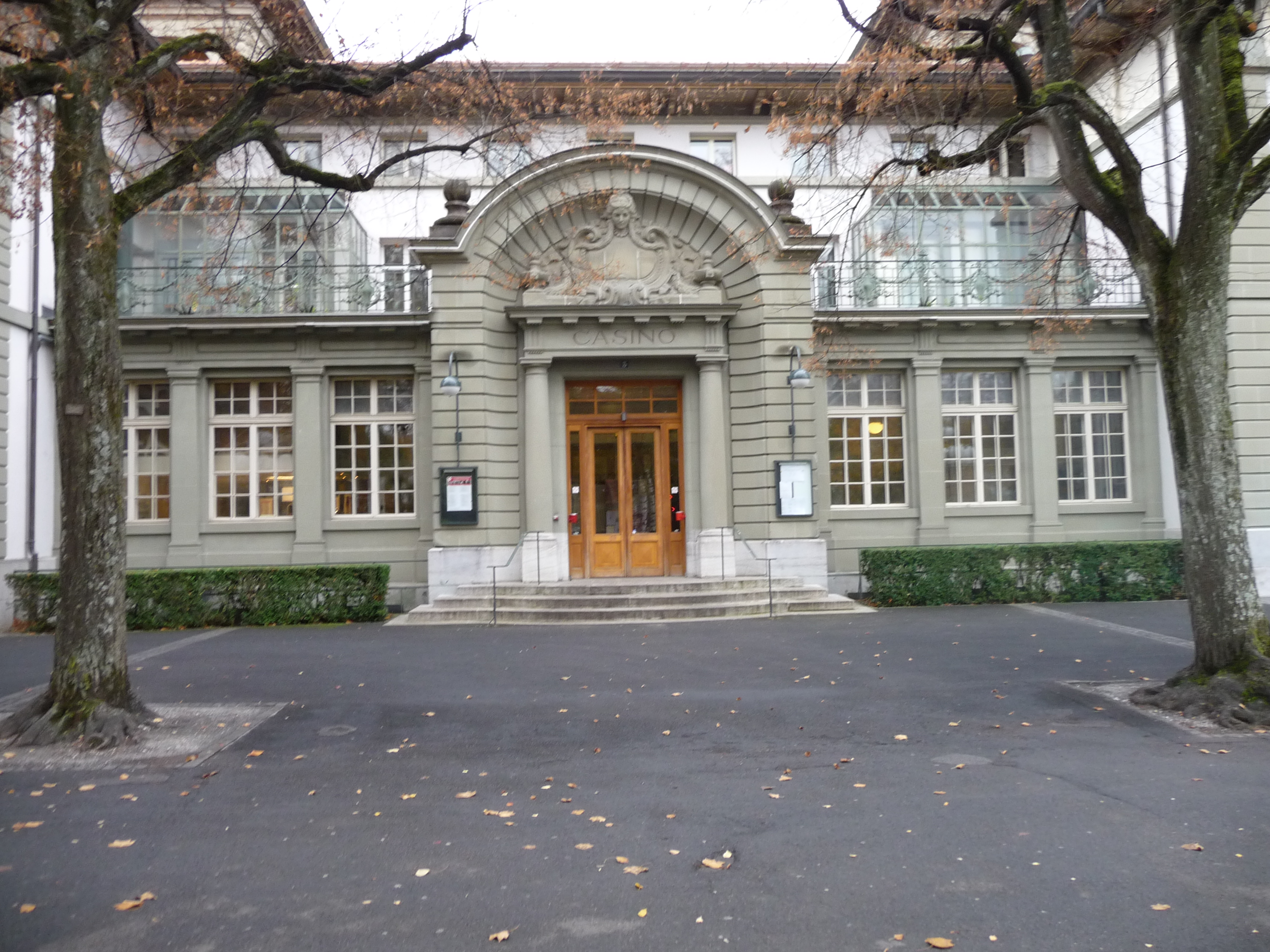
Casino de Montbenon, Lausanne, hosts the Festival cinémas d'Afrique Lausanne. Photo 2009.

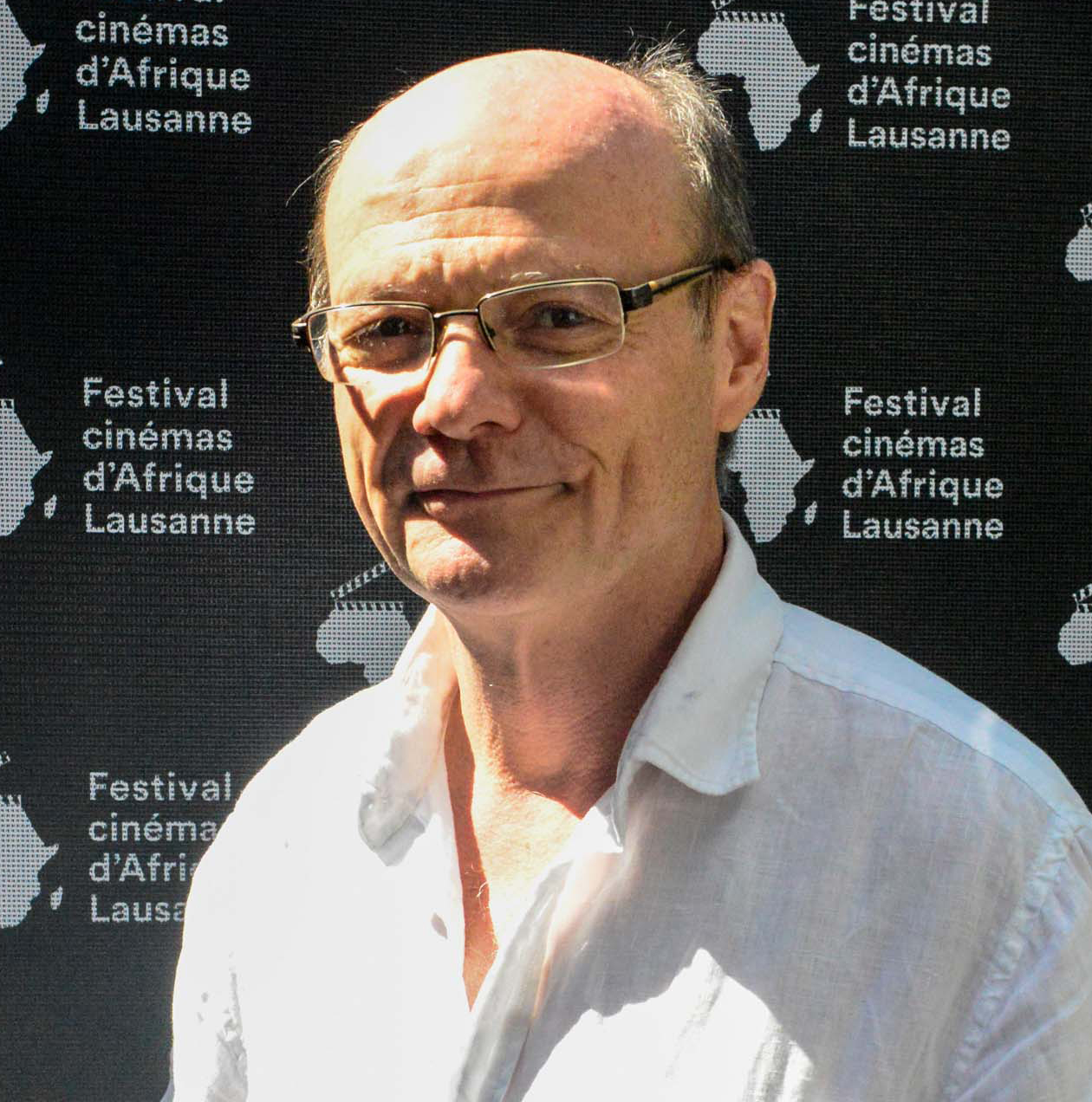
French film journalist and researcher Olivier Barlet at the Festival cinémas d'Afrique Lausanne 2017.

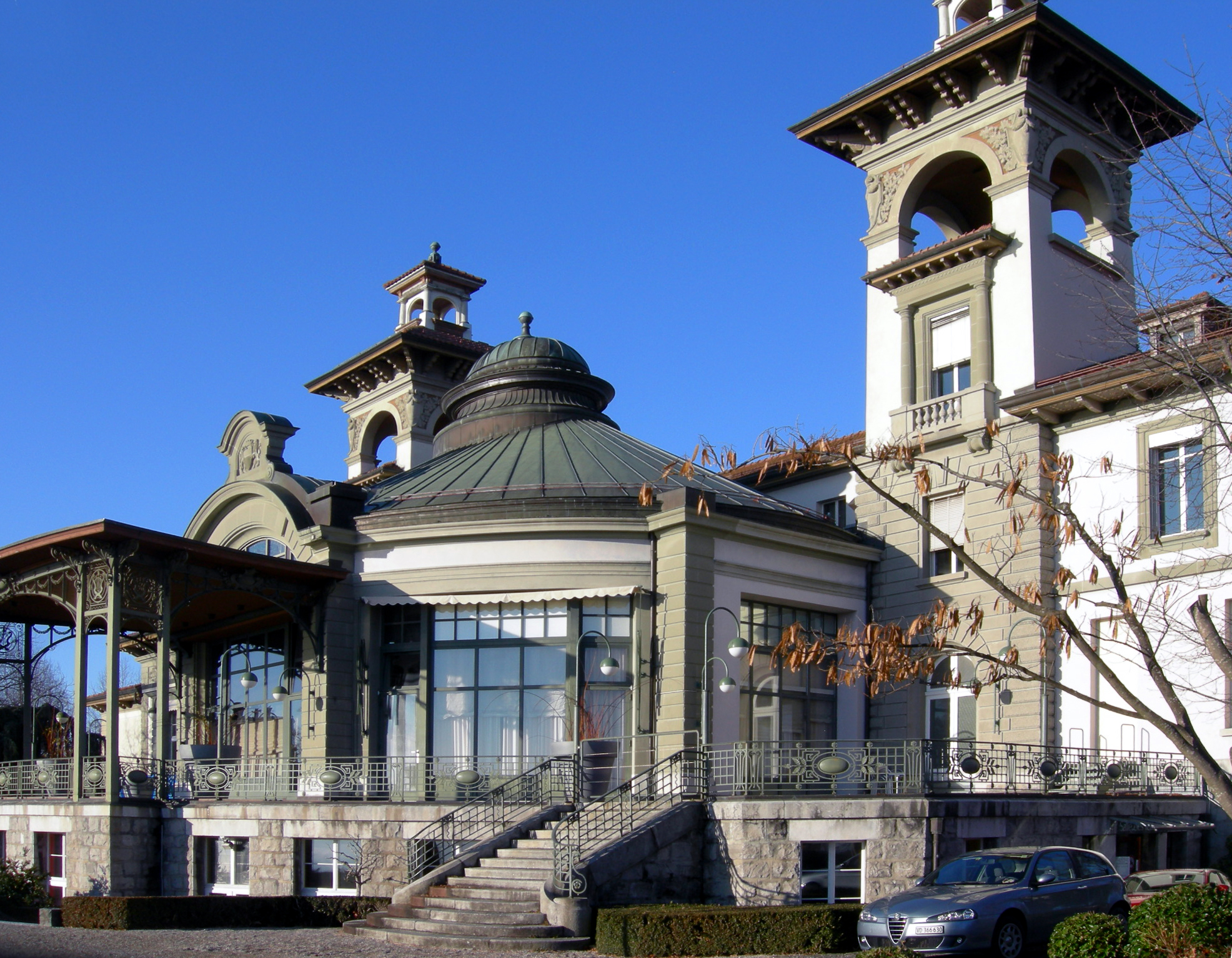
Casino de Montbenon, Lausanne. Photo 2019.

The Festival cinémas d'Afrique Lausanne is an international yearly film festival held in August at Lausanne, Switzerland, since 2006 screening new films about or originating from Africa.

The festival is organised by the local society Association Afrique cinémas and covers both cinematic and TV productions in all genres including fiction, documentary, animation, and virtual reality. It has been supported by various partners, such as the city of Lausanne, the Swiss canton of Vaud, the Organisation Internationale de la Francophonie, the Sandoz Family Foundation and the Loterie romande, the Romandy Lottery. The screenings are hosted by the Swiss Film Archive (Cinémathèque suisse) at the Casino de Montbenon in Lausanne.

== Literature ==
- Association Afrique cinémas (Lausanne) (2006). Festival cinémas d'Afrique (in French). Lausanne: Association Afrique Cinémas, Lausanne. OCLC 997464785.
