= Historical Archive of Skopje =

Macedonian state archive

- Историски архив на Скопје (Macedonian); Arkivi Historik i Shkupit (Albanian)
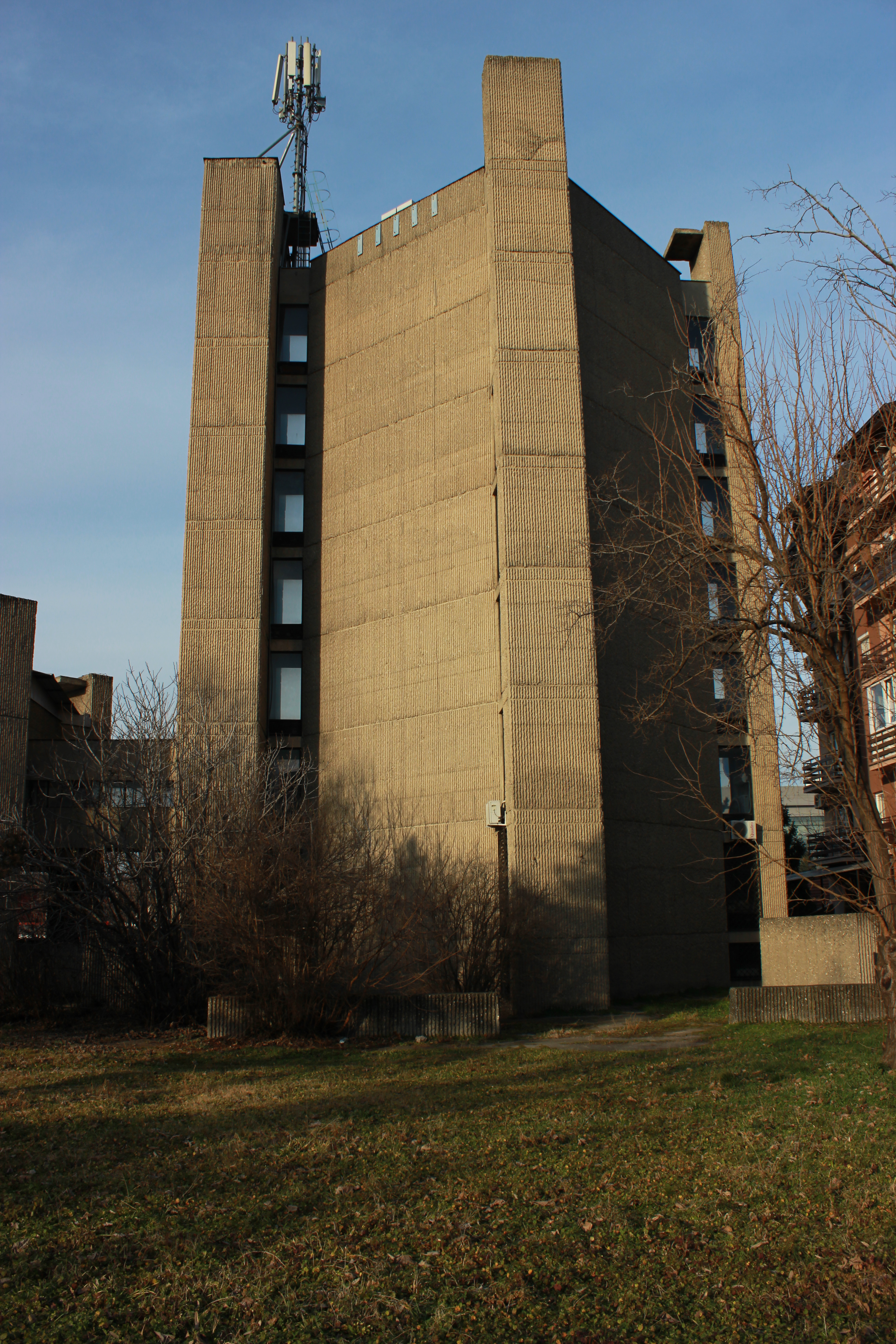
- building housing the archive

Agency overview
- Formed: 1952; 74 years ago
- Jurisdiction: Government of North Macedonia
- Headquarters: Skopje, North Macedonia
- Parent agency: State Archives of the Republic of North Macedonia

The State Archive of the Republic of Macedonia - Department Skopje (Macedonian: Државен архив на Република Македонија - Одделение Скопје, romanized: Državen arhiv na Repubika Makedonija - Oddelenie Skopje), more commonly known as the Historical Archive of Skopje (Macedonian: Историски архив на Скопје, romanized: Istoriski arhiv na Skopje, Albanian: Arkivi Historik i Shkupit) is the primary institution responsible for preservation of archival materials in the City of Skopje and Skopje Statistical Region. Since 1990 the archive formally function as a regional centre of the State Archives of the Republic of North Macedonia.

Following the end of the World War II in Yugoslav Macedonia and the subsequent creation of the archival centre in the city in 1951, the People's Committee of Skopje decided in 1952 to establish the State Archive. This marked the beginning of systematic archival preservation in the newly established People's Republic of Macedonia. Initially named the District Historical Archive-Skopje from late 1953, the institution was later renamed Historical Archive of Skopje. In 1974, it became known as the Archive of Skopje-Skopje, and in 1990, it was restructured into a regional department under the unified administration of the State Archives of the Republic of North Macedonia.

The archive holds 675 fonds and 10 collections, with notable fonds including those related to the City Administration of Skopje, national liberation and people's committees, educational and cultural institutions, commercial enterprises, and religious organizations. The Historical Archive of Skopje building was constructed in brutalist style during the reconstruction of Skopje after 1963 Skopje earthquake based on project prepared by Georgi Konstantinovski.

== See also ==
- List of archives in North Macedonia
