= European Film Gateway =

Film archives portal

- Website: www.europeanfilmgateway.eu
- Launched: 2008; 18 years ago

The European Film Gateway (EFG) is a single access point to the digitized holdings of historical European film documents from numerous film archives and cinematheques, including over 600,000 individual objects from over 60 collections. The European Film Gateway gives access to images, textual materials, and moving images. The vast contents include film stills, set photos, posters, set drawings, portrait photographs, scripts, correspondences, film censorship and visa rulings, out-of-print books, film programs and reviews, as well as newsreels, documentaries, commercials, and feature films. The portal facilitates access to the archives which hold the original materials.

== Background ==
The online portal European Film Gateway is the main outcome of the EU-funded project “EFG – European Film Gateway”. Working with 22 partner organizations from 16 European countries, EFG addressed issues for access to digital content, namely, technical and semantic interoperability, metadata standards, practices for rights’ clearance, and Intellectual Property Rights (IPR) management of cinematographic works. The project was coordinated by the Deutsches Filminstitut (DIF) and funded by the European Commission under eContentplus, the Information and Communication Technologies Policy Support Programme (ICT PSP). It ran from September 2008 to August 2011 was supported by the Association des Cinematheques Europeennes (ACE) as well as the EDL Foundation.

== Key issues ==
=== Technical interoperability and access ===
All metadata provided by the contributing archives is stored centrally in the EFG metadata repository, which was developed in the EFG project. The EFG metadata model is mostly based on the EN 15907: Film identification - Enhancing interoperability of metadata - Element sets and structures standard. Also other models, such as FRBR as well as WPE defined by the OLAC have been considered during establishing the EFG data model.

The multilingual and non-standardized metadata delivered by content providers is harmonised and cleaned before it is ingested in the EFG system. In contrast to the metadata, which is stored centrally, the digital objects remain on individual online platforms run by the archives. Deep links refer the user directly to the objects.

The EFG implemented the technology developed by the Digital Repository Infrastructure Vision for European Research (DRIVER) project. This open service system enables the creation and maintenance of infrastructures capable of supporting the construction of Information Spaces of digital objects collected from various archives. It also permits the creation of service-oriented applications where services can be shared and re-used in other contexts.

=== IPR management and administration ===
The EFG project assessed copyright regulations and legal framework for online use of archival contents through research reports on open content models as well as working with organisations engaged with online publishing of copyrighted archival film material. EFG provided individual network partners with tools for consultations with representatives from rights owners’ and producers’ organisations in order to make the archival material available online.

== Follow-up project ==
EFG1914 is the follow-up project of EFG. It began in February 2012 and runs for two years. Coinciding with the centenary of the First World War, EFG1914 focuses on the digitization of films and other documents from and relating to the war, making the contents available through the European Film Gateway and Europeana. Like EFG, it is funded by the European Commission and coordinated by Deutsches Filminstitut. The project consortium consists of 26 partners, 21 of which are film archives.

To date, only about 20% of the silent film production of the time remains safe-guarded in the archives and was largely unavailable to the public. EFG1914 significantly simplifies access to these films, covering various fields, from newsreels to documentary, fiction, and propaganda films. EFG1914 also includes anti-war films produced after 1918, which reveal the tragedies of the 1910s.

== EFG and Europeana ==
The European Film Gateway is linked to Europeana, the digital showcase of Europe's cultural and scientific heritage. Europeana.eu offers search capabilities through millions of digital objects provided by Europe's museums and galleries, archives, libraries and audio-visual organisations.

== Partners and contributors ==
Institutions	City	Role	Project Partner
Deutsches Filminstitut	Frankfurt	Coordinator/Content Provider	EFG/EFG1914
Arhiva Nationala de Filme	Bucharest	Content Provider	EFG1914
Association des Cinémathèques Européennes (ACE)	Brussels/Frankfurt	Organizational Partner	EFG/EFG1914
Athena Research and Innovation Center in Information Communication & Knowledge Technologies	Athens	Technology Provider	EFG1914
Centre national du cinéma et de l’image animée – Archives françaises du Film	Bois d'Arcy	Content Provider	EFG1914
Cinecittà Luce S.p.A.	Rome	Content Provider	EFG/EFG1914
Cinemateca Portuguesa, Museu do cinema	Lisbon	Content Provider	EFG
Cineteca del Comune di Bologna	Bologna	Content Provider	EFG/EFG1914
Cinémathèque Royale de Belgique	Brussels	Content Provider	EFG1914
La Cineteca del Friuli	Gemona	Content Provider	EFG1914
CNR-ISTI	Pisa	Technology Provider	EFG/EFG1914
Det Danske Filminstitut	Copenhagen	Content Provider	EFG/EFG1914
Deutsche Kinemathek – Museum für Film und Fernsehen	Berlin	Content Provider	EFG1914
Europeana Foundation	The Hague	Promoting Concertation	EFG
Eremo srl	Cupramontana	Project Management Consultancy	EFG
Estonian Film Archive	Tallinn	Content Provider	EFG1914
EYE Film Institute Netherlands	Amsterdam	Content Provider	EFG/EFG1914
Fern Universität Hagen	The Hague	Content Provider	EFG
Filmarchiv Austria	Vienna	Content Provider	EFG/EFG1914
Filmoteka Narodowa	Warsaw	Content Provider/ Associated Partner	EFG
Fondazione Cineteca Italiana	Milan	Content Provider	EFG1914
Fraunhofer Institute for Integrated Circuits IIS	Erlangen	Technology Provider	EFG1914
Imperial War Museums	London	Content Provider	EFG1914
Instituto de la Cinematografia y Artes Audiovisuales – Filmoteca Española	Madrid	Content Provider	EFG1914
CulturArts Generalitat. Unidad de Audiovisual y Cinematografía	Valencia	Content Provider	EFG1914
Jugoslovenska Kinoteka	Belgrade	Content Provider	EFG1914
National Audiovisual Institute (Finland)	Helsinki	Content Provider	EFG
La Cinémathèque Française	Paris	Content Provider	EFG
Lichtspiel- Kinemathek Bern	Bern	Content Provider	EFG
Lietuvos Centrinis Valstybés Archyvas	Vilnius	Content Provider	EFG
Hungarian National Digital Archive MANDA	Budapest	Content Provider	EFG/EFG1914
Národní filmový archiv	Prague	Content Provider	EFG/EFG1914
Nasjonalbiblioteket	Oslo	Content Provider	EFG/EFG1914
Österreichisches Filmmuseum	Vienna	Content Provider	EFG1914
Reelport GmbH	Cologne	Technology Provider	EFG/EFG1914
Tainiothiki tis Ellados - Greek Film Archive	Athens	Content Provider	EFG

== See also ==
- Europeana
