= Filmportal.de =

Online database related to German film

filmportal.de
- Website type: Database
- Available in: German
- Country of origin: Germany
- Industry: Film industry
- Products: Information on films and filmmakers
- Website: filmportal.de
- Registration: Optional
- Current status: Active

filmportal.de is an online database of information related to German film. It includes extensive information on films and filmmakers as well as articles on film issues. The website was released on occasion of the 54th Berlin International Film Festival on 11 February 2005. filmportal.de was revised and expanded in 2011/2012.

== Content ==
The database provides information on about 85 000 German cinema and television films (as of June 2015) from 1895 to the present. About 8 000 films are presented in detail with content descriptions, stills and/or posters. In addition, filmportal.de catalogues about 190 000 names of filmmakers, 5 000 of these entries feature a biography.

The lexical information is supplemented by trailers, film clips from German classics, and, increasingly, full-length films. Moreover, editorial texts link the information with the history of film in the Weimar Republic, Nazi Germany and the GDR.

== Organising institutions ==
filmportal.de was established by Deutsches Filminstitut (Frankfurt) in collaboration with CineGraph - Hamburg Center for Research on Film and with support of the other members of the German Kinematheksverbund and the associations of the German film industry. The website is cooperating with the Association of European Cinematheques (ACE), Arte, DEFA Foundation, Goethe-Institut, German Films Service + Marketing GmbH, Deutsche Filmakademie and Berlin International Film Festival.
