= Deutsches Filmarchiv =

German film archive

Coordinates: 51°N 9°E

The Deutsches Filmarchiv ("German Film Archive"), originally the Archiv für Filmwissenschaft ("Archive for Film Science"), formally established in 1947, was the first film archive set up in West Germany after World War II.

== Archiv für Filmwissenschaft (1947-52) ==
By the end of the war in 1945, the two greatest existing German film collections, the Reichsfilmarchiv and the Ufa-Lehrschau ("UFA Educational Viewing"), had been in part destroyed and in part scattered to the four winds. The initiative for the setting up of a new film archive came from Hanns Wilhelm Lavies, who immediately after the war, on his own initiative and without any organisational backing, began intensively collecting films and film-related documentation in Berlin and the West German zone of occupation. From the beginning of the Cold War he had the support of the American occupying authorities.

At first he tried to have his collection, formalised in 1947 as the Archiv für Filmwissenschaft, attached to the photographic collection of Marburg University, but without success. However, with the support of Curt Oertel, Lavies' collection was accepted in 1948 for placement at Wiesbaden, and was moved the following year to Schloss Biebrich. On 13 April 1949 it was renamed the Deutsches Institut für Filmkunde (DIF) ("German Institute for Film Studies"). In 1952 the Archiv für Filmwissenschaft became a department within the expanded DIF and was renamed the Deutsches Filmarchiv ("German Film Archive").

== Deutsches Filmarchiv (1952-56) ==
Lavies, as the creator of the collection, remained as the head of the new operation, which however he continued to run as his own private endeavour; this brought him into repeated conflict with his funders in the film world. He stayed however until 1 January 1959, by which time most of the underlying organisational problems had been resolved.

As proper storage of the vulnerable archive material and film stock was not possible in the institute's premises, part of the collection had to be stored offsite in the Bundesarchiv ("German Federal Archive"), founded in 1954, and systematic sorting and conservation of the DIF film prints did not start until 1958.

However, the constant disagreements about the institute's finances and the fact of its support from both the film industry and the public purse, which raised serious questions about the ownership of the collections, led to a split on 29 May 1956 between the DIF and the film archive, which was turned into an association called Das Deutsche Filmarchiv ("The German Film Archive"), under which name it joined the Fédération Internationale des Archives du Film (FIAF).

== See also ==
- List of film archives

== Sources ==
- Deutsches Filminstitut website: foundation of the Archiv für Filmwissenschaft (in German)
- Deutsches Filminstitut website: the Filmarchiv and the turmoil of its formative years (in German)
