= List of archives in North Macedonia =

This is a list of archives in North Macedonia.

== Archives in North Macedonia ==
- State Archives of the Republic of North Macedonia
  - Historical Archive of Bitola
  - Historical Archive of Veles
  - Historical Archive of Kumanovo
  - Historical Archive of Ohrid
  - Historical Archive of Prilep
  - Historical Archive of Skopje
  - Historical Archive of Strumica
  - Historical Archive of Tetovo
  - Historical Archive of Štip
- Cinematheque of Macedonia

== See also ==
- List of archives
- List of museums in North Macedonia
- Culture of North Macedonia
