= Kinemathek Bern =

Museum in Bern, Switzerland

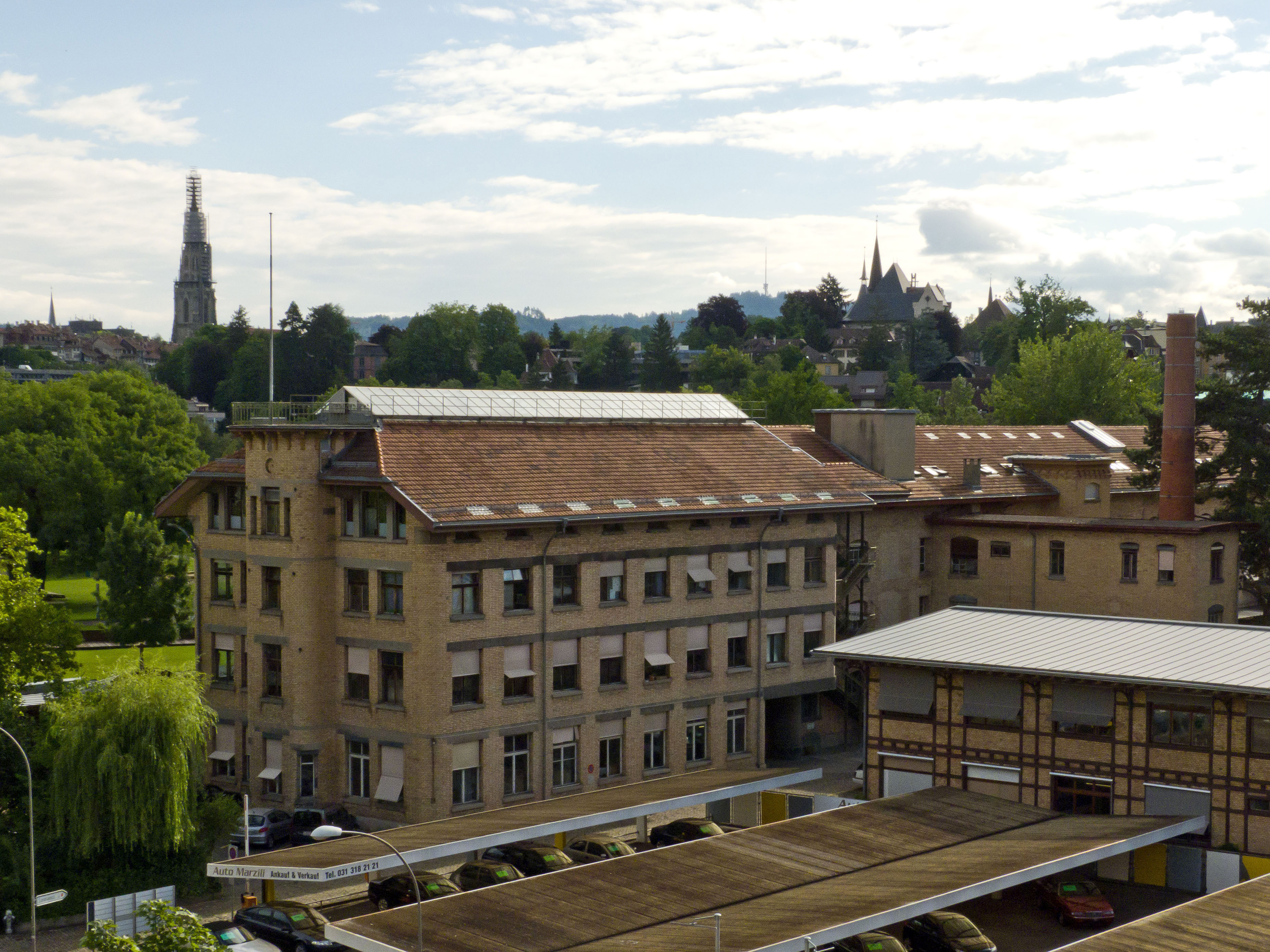
- Established: 2000
- Location: Bern, Switzerland
- Coordinates: 46.940°N 7.442°E

The Lichtspiel / Kinemathek Bern is a film archive in Bern, Switzerland.

In summer 2000, cinema technician Walter A. Ritschard took care of the Lichtspiel, an old cinematographic collection, and from this a regional film archive was developed. Since 2005, the Lichtspiel has been a member of the Fédération Internationale des Archives du Film (FIAF).

== History ==
The Lichtspiel is concerned with preserving the national film and cinema heritage, through preservation and restoration of old materials.

Since 2012, the Lichtspiel is a part of the Filmhaus Bern, a building housing various Bernese filmmakers, and in this community much more a place between film production and museum. There are often a program with films from people, who work in the same house.

The Lchtspiel is run by an association with around 700 members (as of 2025), a few staff members, people doing alternative civilian service and many volunteers.

== Program ==
Since the opening of the Lichtspiel, there are shown every Sunday evening two film reels with short clips from the archive and gives the chance to take a view inside the collection of the archive.

== Archive and Collection ==
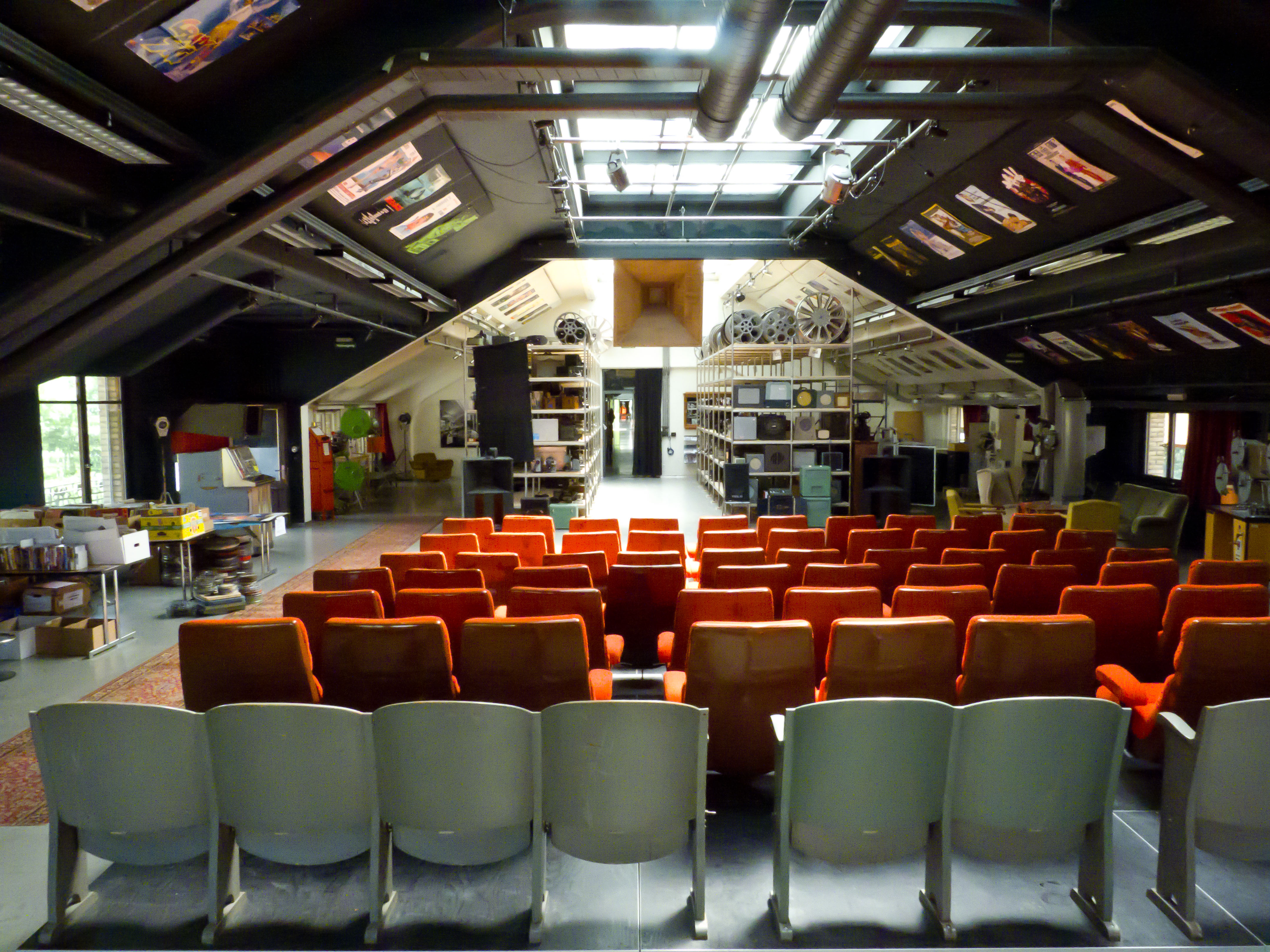
Screening room in the Lichtspiel (2012)

The collections of the Lichtspiel are made up of various deposits of filmmakers as well as private collections and numerous discounts from different personalities.

The Film Collection contains in this moment 30'000 film reels (as of 2025) mostly with semi-professional, education and documentary films. Further it is a special interest of the archive to collect Scopitones and animation films.

The Library contains a lot of literature to film in generally and in detail a lot of Swiss film journals. There are also a lot of stuff to the technical aspects of cinema and projection.

== See also ==
- List of film archives
- ACE Association of European Film Archives and Cinematheques
- Swiss Film Archive
