= Swiss Posters Collection =

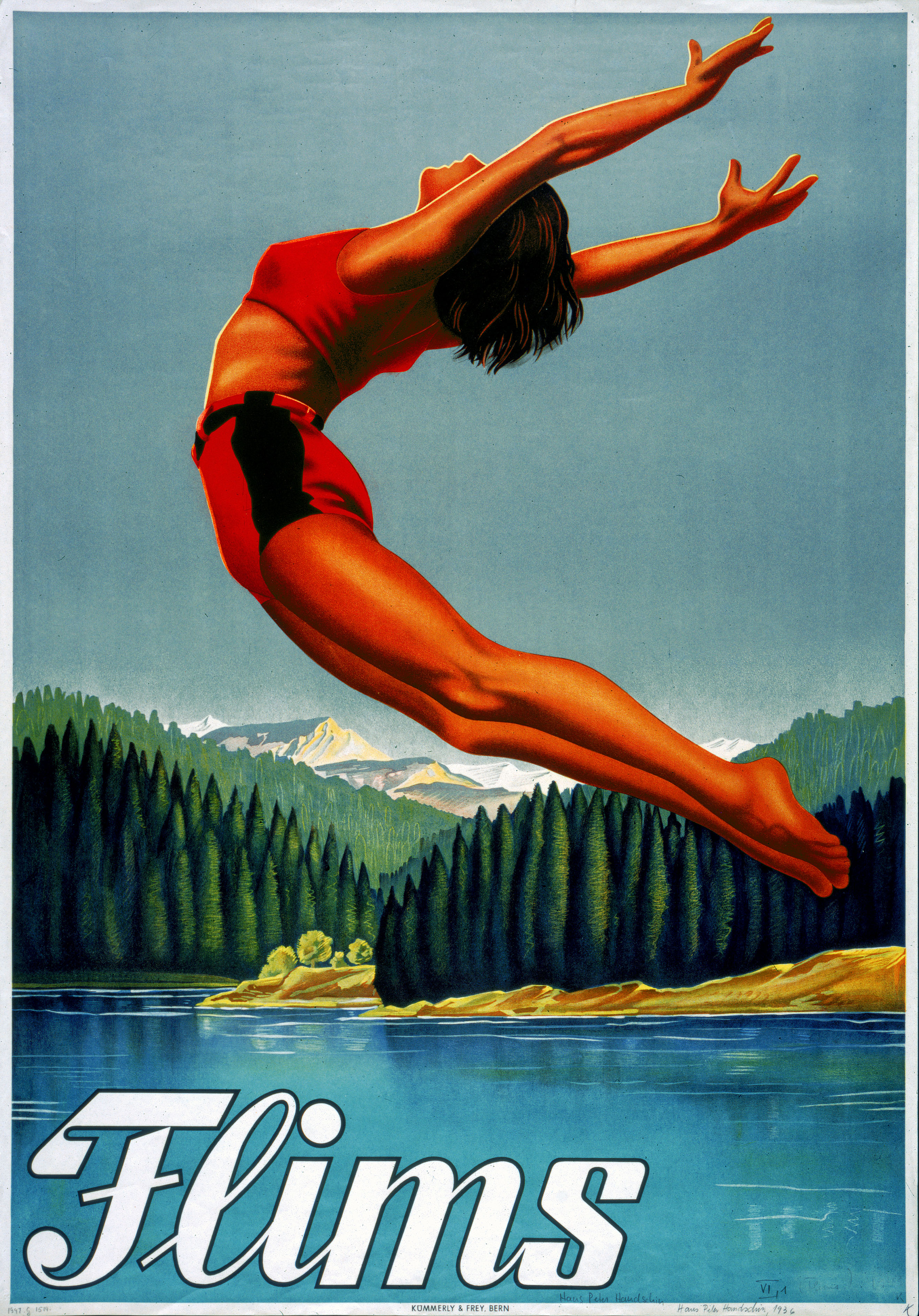
A poster from the Swiss National Library (depicting Flims, around 1936).

The Swiss Poster Collection is a Swiss archive which, in a joint effort with various Swiss libraries and museums, offers access to digitized posters covering “a time span from the second half of the 19th century to the present”.

Currently, the posters come from the Swiss National Library, university libraries or libraries in the cantons of Fribourg, Geneva, Neuchâtel, Vaud and Valais, the Swiss Museum of Transport, the St. Maurice's Abbey as well as the Swiss Film Archive.

== Literature ==
- Bruno Margadant. The Swiss poster: 1900–1983. Basel: Birkhäuser, 1983.
- Willy Rotzler. Das Plakat in der Schweiz: mit 376 Kurzbiographien von Plakatgestalterinnen und Plakatgestaltern. Schaffhausen: Stemmle, 1990.
- 50 years Swiss posters selected by the Federal department of home affairs: 1941–1990. Genève: Société générale d'affichage / Bern: Kümmerly + Frey, 1991.
- Schweizer Plakate des Jahres ... ausgezeichnet vom Eidgenössischen Departement des Innern. Genève: Société générale d'affichage, 1976–1999

== See also ==
- Swiss National Library
- Federal Archives of Switzerland
- Swiss Film Archive
