= Cinematheque of Macedonia =

- Кинотека на Македонија (Macedonian)

Agency overview
- Formed: 1974; 52 years ago
- Jurisdiction: Government of North Macedonia
- Headquarters: Skopje, North Macedonia
- Agency executive: Boško Grujoski, Director
- Website: Official website

The Cinematheque of Macedonia (Macedonian: Кинотека на Македонија, romanized: Kinoteka na Makedonija) is a film archive located in Skopje, the capital of North Macedonia. Founded in 1974 and operational since 1976, it is the national film library of North Macedonia. It is affiliated with several international organizations, including the International Federation of Film Archives (FIAF), the European Association of Cinematheques (ACE), and the "Europa Cinemas" association. The institution houses a movie theater with 136 seats, offering film screenings as part of a regular program every weekday from Monday to Saturday.

== See also ==
- Cinema of North Macedonia
- North Macedonia Film Agency
- List of archives in North Macedonia
- Culture of North Macedonia
- Yugoslav Film Archive
