= Swiss Film Archive =

Swiss film archives and cinematheque

Cinémathèque suisse
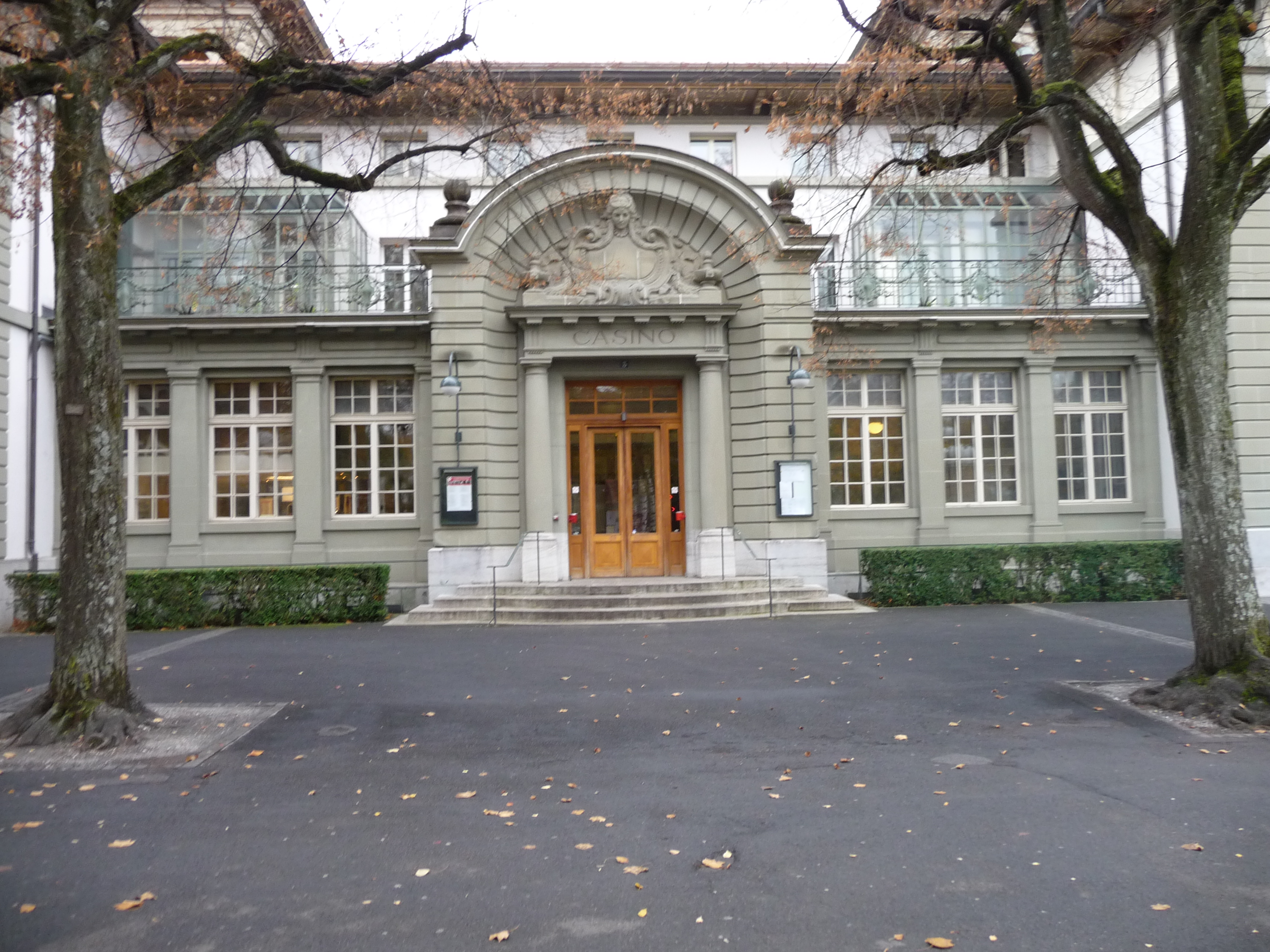
- Type: NPO
- Legal status: Private foundation
- Purpose: Cinematheque; Cinematography study centre National museum
- Headquarters: Casino de Montbenon
- Location: Lausanne, Switzerland
- Coordinates: 46°31′14″N 06°37′30″E
- Chief Executive: Frédéric Maire
- Chairman: Jean Studer
- Affiliations: International Federation of Film Archives
- Budget: CHF5 million
- Staff: 100 (total)
- Website: cinematheque.ch/en
- Formerly called: Archives cinématographiques suisses

The Cinémathèque suisse (Swiss Cinematheque), formerly the Archives cinématographiques suisses (Swiss Film Archive), is a Swiss state-approved non-profit foundation headquartered in Lausanne. It aims to collect, protect, study and present film archives. The Swiss Cinematheque has its archives in Penthaz and a branch office in Zürich.

== History ==
=== Timeline ===
With the support of the Kunstmuseum Basel, a group of admirers of independent films founded the Archives cinématographiques suisses (Swiss Film Archive) in Basel in 1943.

Subsequently, the Association cinémathèque suisse (Swiss Cinematheque Association) was created. The archives were transferred to Lausanne to the Cinémathèque suisse (Swiss Cinematheque), co-founded by Freddy Buache in 1948 and inaugurated by Erich von Stroheim in 1950. In precarious condition, the Swiss Cinematheque was located on Place de la Cathédrale in Lausanne. At the time, it had no projection room.

The Swiss Cinematheque was one of the first members of the International Federation of Film Archives.

Claude Emery was the Swiss Cinematheque's first director until Buache held this position from 1951 to 1996.

In 1981, the Cinematheque acquired and moved to the former Casino of Montbenon in Lausanne to establish itself in a better environment.

In 1992, the Swiss Cinematheque began to store archives in a Penthaz building.

The Swiss Cinematheque has been considered "one of the ten most important cinematheques in the world" by the International Federation of Film Archives.

In 1995, the collection of the Swiss Cinematheque ranked sixth among the "most important in the world" after those of Bois d'Arcy [National Centre for Cinema and the Moving Image], Brussels [Cinematek], London [BFI National Archive], Moscow [Gosfilmofond], and Washington [Library of Congress].

The Swiss Federal Office of Culture has been the foundation's primary funder with the City of Lausanne and the canton of Vaud.

Hervé Dumont was its director from 1996 to 2008.

In the early 2000s, a project was initiated to make the Penthaz site the first federal building dedicated to cinema.

Dumont was succeeded by Vinzenz Hediger in 2008.

Frédéric Maire was appointed director in 2009.

In 2010, renovation and expansion work on the Penthaz building began.

Jean Studer, chairman of the Bank Council of the Swiss National Bank and lawyer, became chairman of the Foundation Board of the Swiss Cinematheque on 1 July 2016, thus succeeding Marc Wehrlin.

=== Activities ===
Filmmakers Jean-Luc Godard and Jean-Marie Straub were affiliated with the Swiss Cinematheque and maintained close relations with the foundation's members throughout their careers.

The premises in Penthaz became the Swiss Cinematheque Research and Archiving Centre. It was inaugurated on 6 September 2019 in the presence of Federal Councillor Alain Berset and Vaud State Councillor Cesla Amarelle. The total cost was 50.6 million Swiss francs. Located near Lausanne, in the canton of Vaud, the 13,000 square metres (140,000 sq ft) building properly stores hundreds of thousands of film reels and posters. The archives are grouped on three levels in the basement of the Penthaz centre on an area of 5,300 square metres (57,000 sq ft).

On average, 400 films are donated annually to the Swiss Cinematheque by filmmakers, distributors and collectors. Around 15 to 20 films are restored annually by the involvement of the Swiss Cinematheque's staff, which includes 100 professionals, 75 of whom work full-time, as of 2023. The 100 people working for the foundation are spread over three sites: Lausanne, Penthaz and Zürich. About 50 people work at Penthaz, while the branch office is in Zürich and the seat is in Lausanne.

== Holdings ==
As of 2019, the Swiss Cinematheque holds 700,000 reels, 85,000 films, 10,000 scripts, 26,000 books, 500,000 posters, 2,000 old cameras, 3 million photos and 1 million posters. It also includes quantities of documents and other Swiss and foreign cinema objects.

== Gallery ==
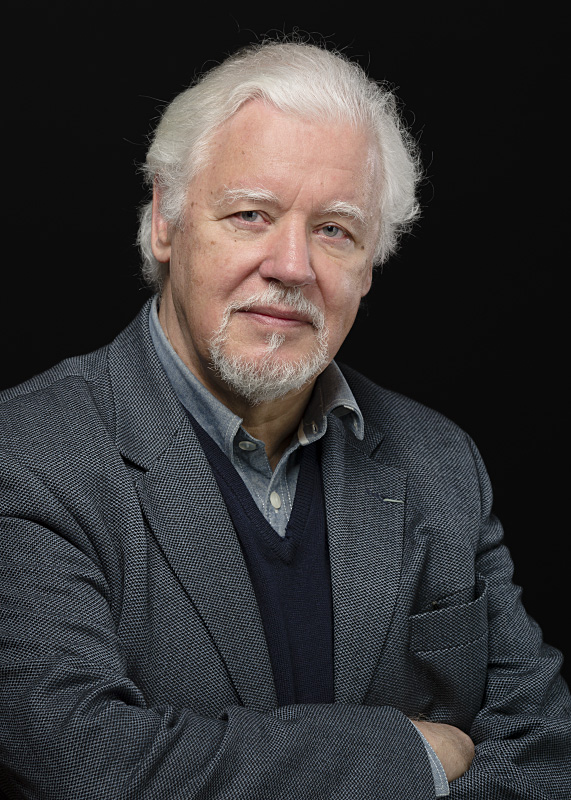
Hervé Dumont was director of the Swiss Cinematheque from 1996 to 2008

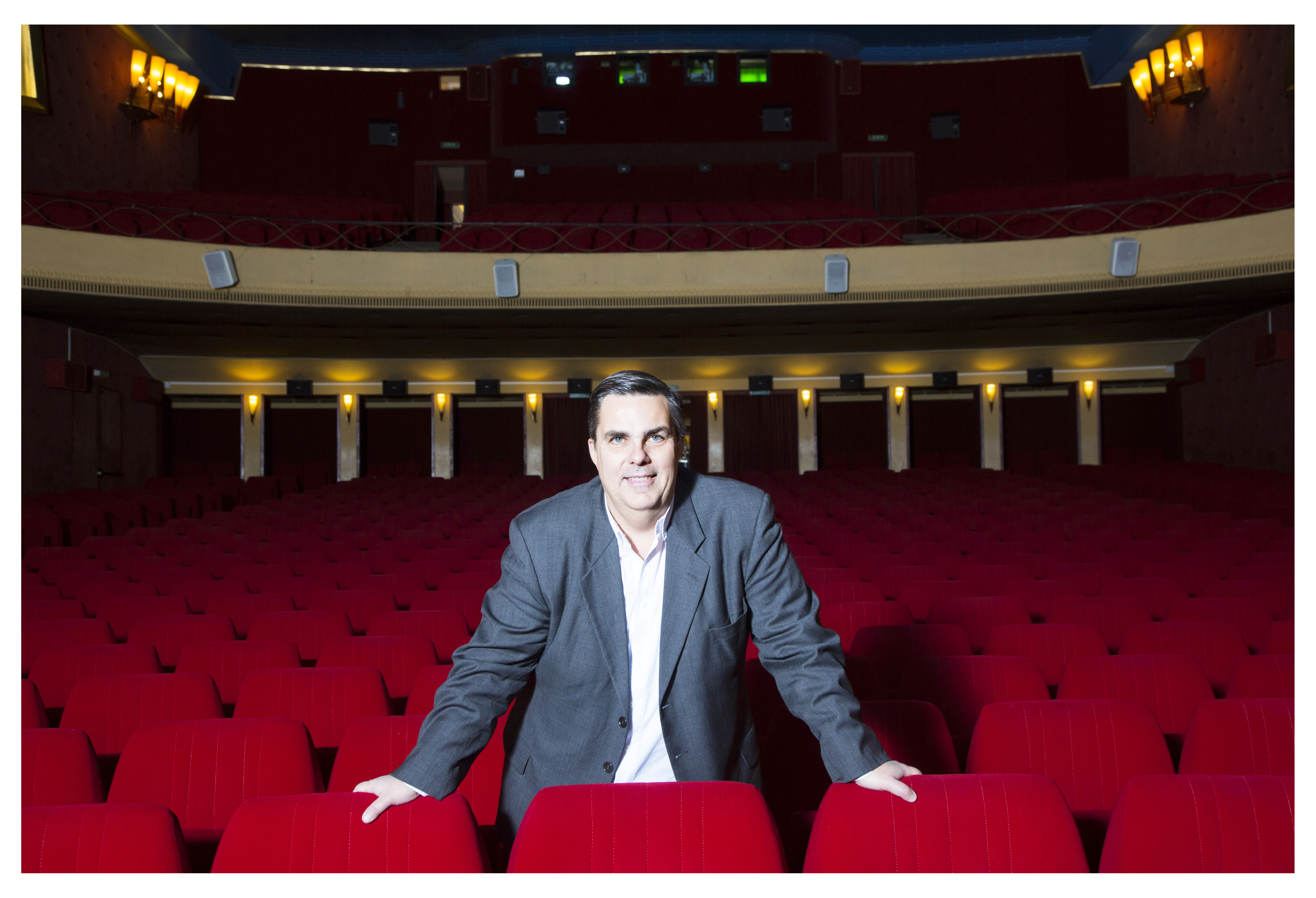
Frédéric Maire, director since 2009, in the Cinéma Capitole

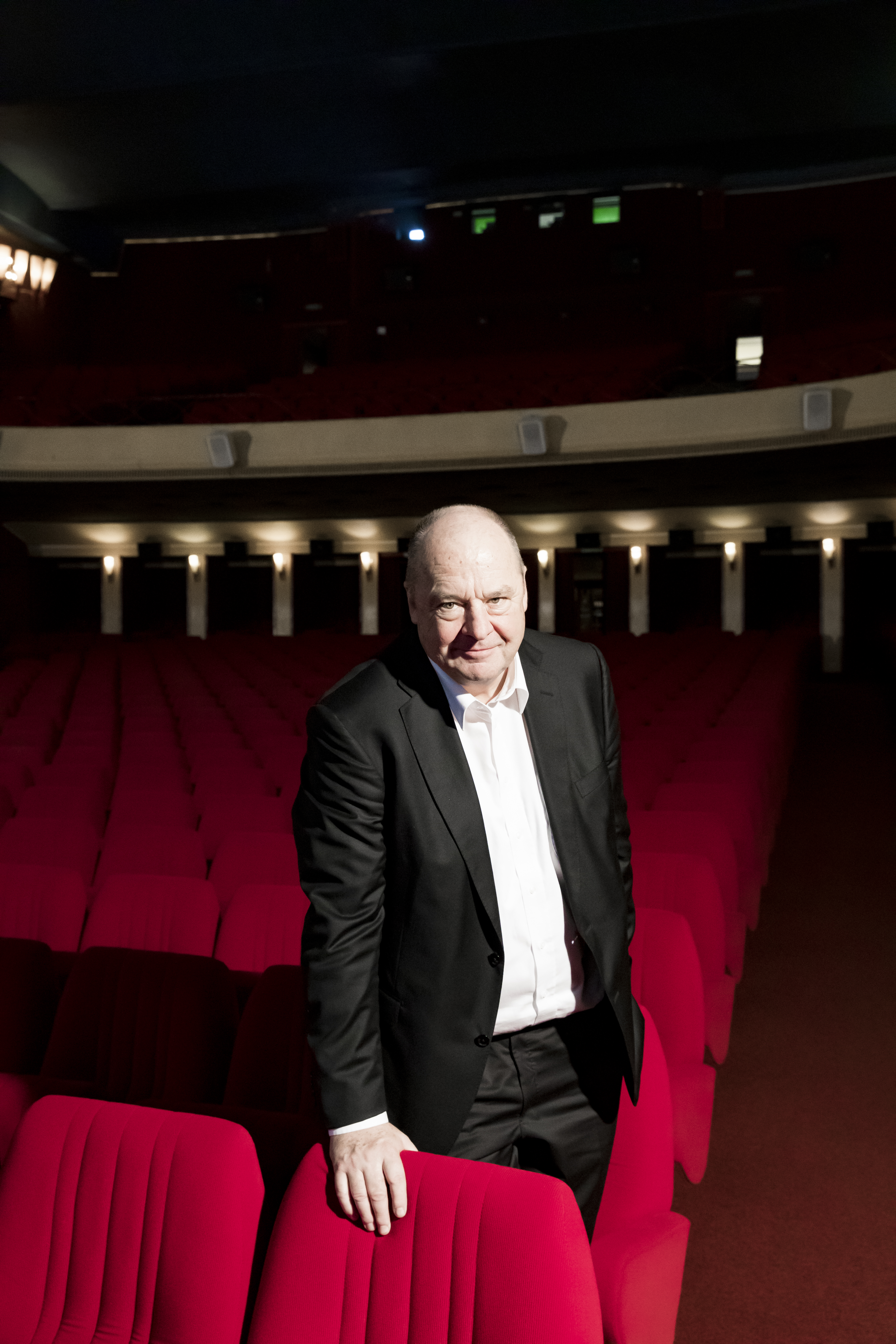
Jean Studer, chairman of the Foundation Board of the Swiss Cinematheque since 2016

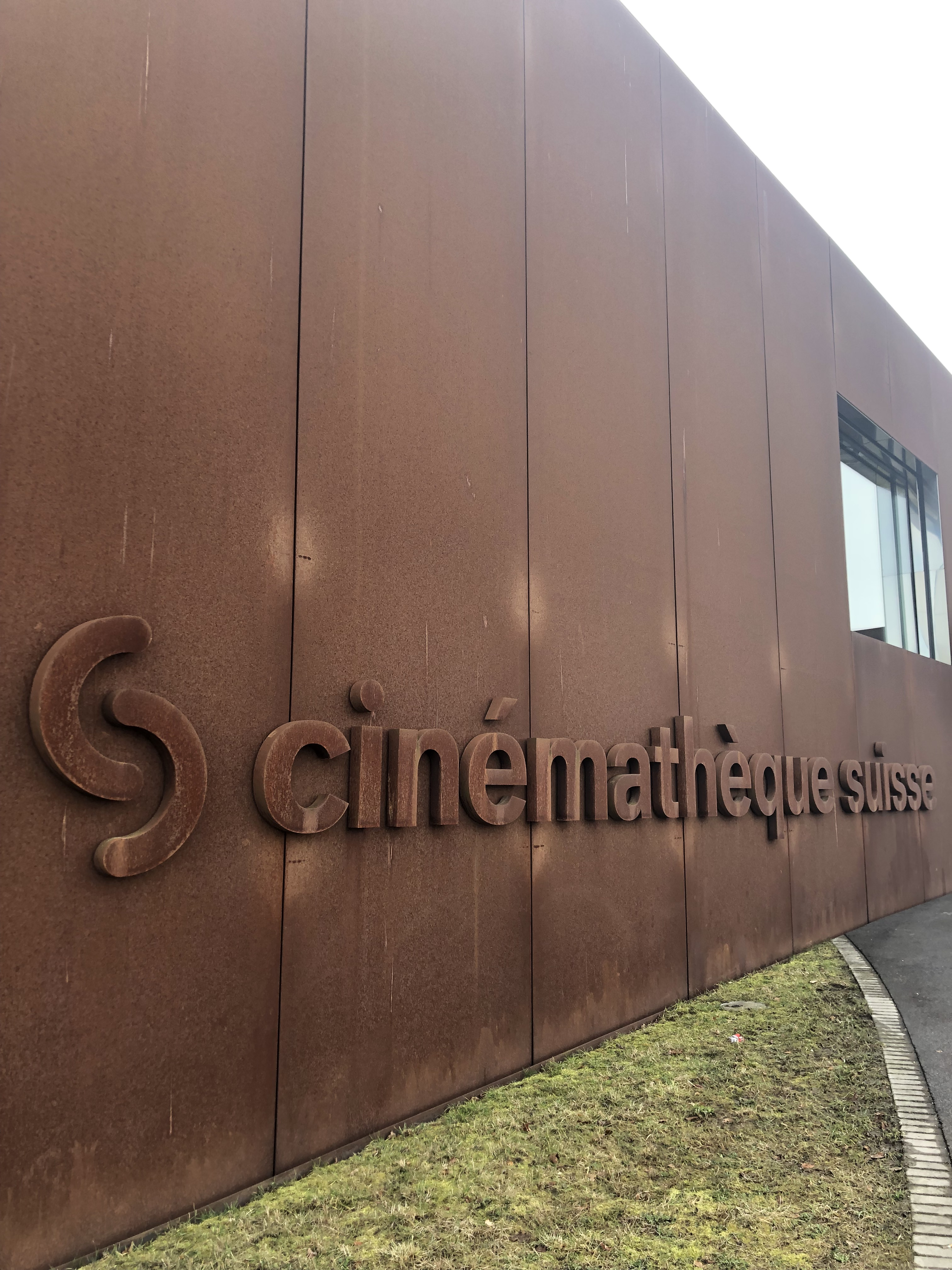
The Swiss Cinematheque Research and Archiving Centre in Penthaz

== See also ==
- Association des Cinémathèques Européennes (ACE)
- Cinéma Capitole
- Cinema of Switzerland
- Federal Archives of Switzerland
- List of film archives
- List of Swiss films
- Swiss Posters Collection
