= Deutsches Filminstitut =

German institute for the study of film

The Deutsches Filminstitut – DIF ("German Film Institute") is an institute for the study of film, based in Frankfurt am Main, Germany.

== History ==
The Deutsches Filminstitut was founded on 13 April 1949 as the Deutsches Institut für Filmkunde (DIF). In 1952, the Deutsches Filmarchiv ("German Film Archive"; founded in Marburg in 1947 by Hanns Wilhelm Lavies as the Archiv für Filmwissenschaft) was set up as an autonomous department of the DIF, from which it separated again after a reorganisation in 1956.

On 1 January 1959, Lavies left the DIF and was succeeded as director by Max Lippmann. Theo Fürstenau headed the institute between 1966 and 1981. In 1981, Gerd Albrecht was appointed director of the DIF. On February 1, 1997, Claudia Dillmann became head of the institution, which has been officially known as the "Deutsches Filminstitut – DIF" since October 30, 1999. In January 2006, the organisation merged with the Deutsches Filmmuseum ("German Film Museum"), also based in Frankfurt am Main. Claudia Dillmann took early retirement in mid-September 2017. In September 2017, the DIF's administrative board appointed Ellen Harrington as her successor, who held office from January 1, 2018, to July 2024. She changed the name of the institution to DFF – Deutsches Filminstitut & Filmmuseum e.V. In July 2024, Tobias Römer (administrative director) and Christine Kopf (initially acting, officially artistic director since April 2025) took over the management of the institution, whose board they also form. Dr. Simone Emmelius joined this committee as the third board member in July 2025.

== Functions ==
The DFF has one of the largest film archives in Germany and one of the most comprehensive collections of material on all aspects of cinematography and cinema.

Current projects include:

- The edition and publication of the censorship decisions of the Berliner Film-Oberprüfstelle ("Berlin Film Inspection Point") from 1920 to 1938
- COLLATE – a collaborative system for the annotation and indexing of archive material
- filmportal.de – an internet portal for German film
- filmarchives-online.eu – union catalogue of European film archives
- EFG – The European Film Gateway – a single access point to digital collections held in European film archives and cinémathèques

The DIF is a founding member of the Deutscher Kinemathekenverbund ("German Union of Cinematheques").

== See also ==
- Museumsufer
