= Gosfilmofond =

Main film archive of the Russian Federation

Gosfilmofond of Russia
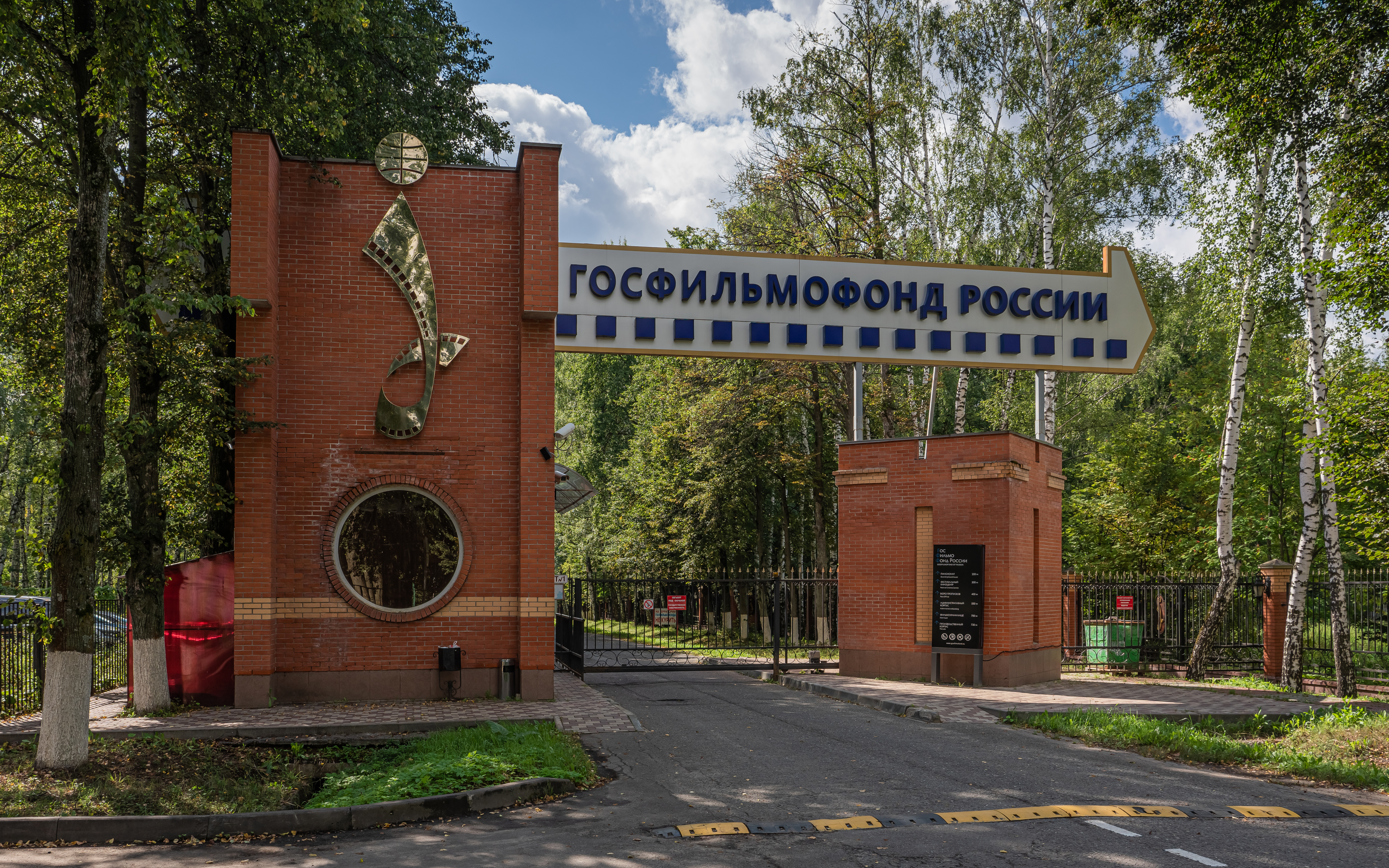
- Formation: 1948
- Type: Film archive
- Headquarters: Belye Stolby, Domodedovo, Moscow Oblast, Russia
- Website: gosfilmofond.ru

Gosfilmofond is a state film archive in Russia. It is the main film archive of the Russian Federation and a member of the International Federation of Film Archives (FIAF). It is a state cultural institution — curator of films collection and other materials, engaged in collecting, creative production, cultural and educational, research, methodological and informational activities in the field of cinematography. The collection includes some historic American films. The Director-General is Nikolay Malakov.

== History ==
The name Gosfilmofond is an abbreviation of three words: Gosudarstvennyi (Russian: Государственный, meaning "of the State"), film (Russian: фильм, "a film" in the sense "a movie"), and fond (Russian: фонд, "a fund or foundation"). The idea of creating a national film archive was actively discussed by filmmakers in 1920s. The basis of Gosfilmofond was a unique collection of old films, rescued by film historian Sergei Komarov. It was a collection of silent films, which, by the efforts of Komarov, were moved to the State Technical College of Cinematography. Later these films became a part of Gosfilmofond Collection.

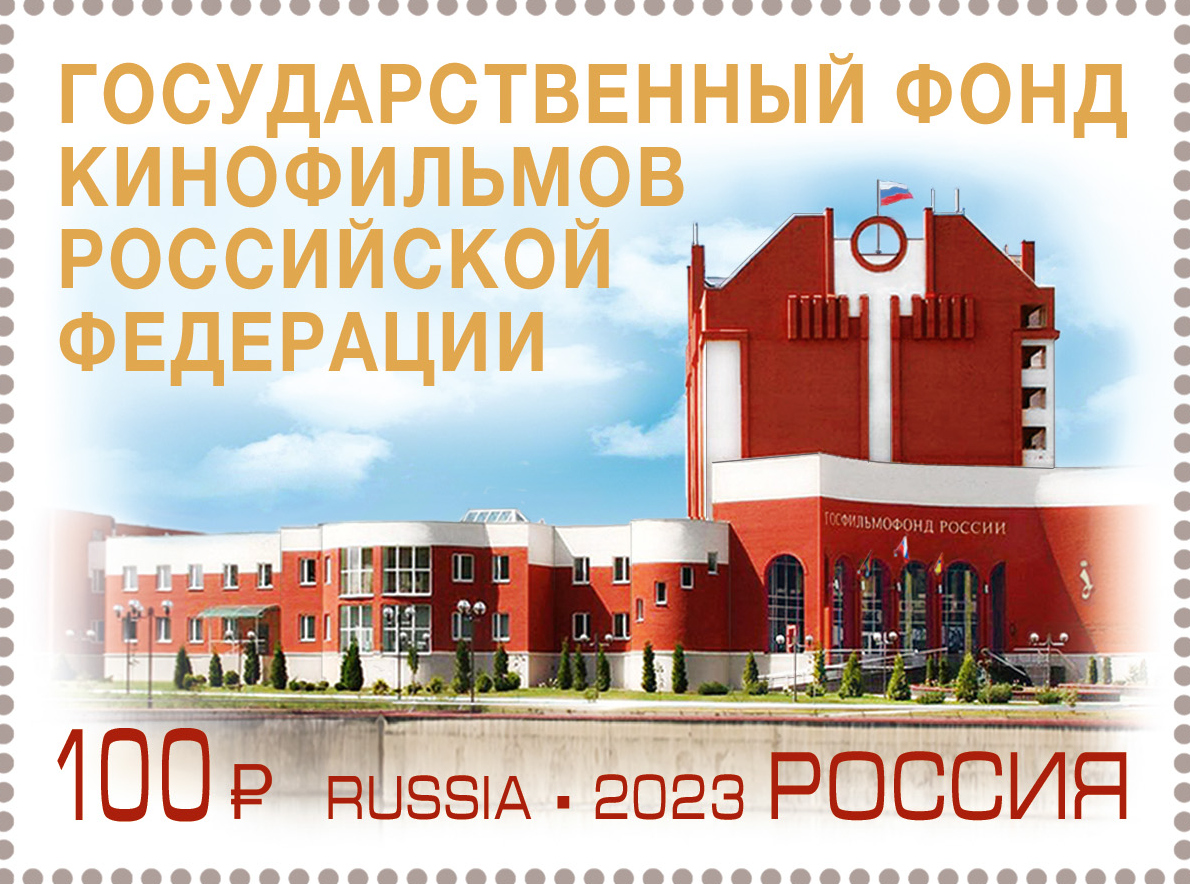
2023 stamp of Russia dedicated to the 75th anniversary of Gosfilmofond

On 2 October 1935, the Organizational Bureau decided to create a film-negative fund, because of a poor conditions of storage for films and other cinema materials. In 1936 it was proposed to the Directorate-General of the cinema-photo industry to build a central vault for negatives in Moscow.

Firstly, it was decided to build the storage on the territory of the Mosfilm film studio. But then it was moved to the village of Belye Stolby near Moscow. The construction began in 1937.

The official opening of Gosfilmofond was in 1948.

On 18 March 1966, the profile cinema 'Illusion' in Moscow was opened especially for showing movies from the archive in one of the famous Stalinist skyscrapers. The film-premiere was The Battleship Potemkin by Sergei Eisenstein.

In 1993, by the decree of the President of the Russian Federation, the Gosfilmofond was included in the State collection of especially valuable objects of cultural heritage.

In 1998, the Gosfilmofond became a member of the Association of European Cinematheques, which is patronized by the Council of Europe.

In 2010, the Gosfilmofond presented the Library of Congress with digital copies of lost U.S. silent films.

In 2015, leaders of the organization planned a rival to the Cannes Film Festival that would highlight films from the BRICS nations.

In 2018, the Gosfilmofond celebrated its 70th anniversary.

== Festival ==
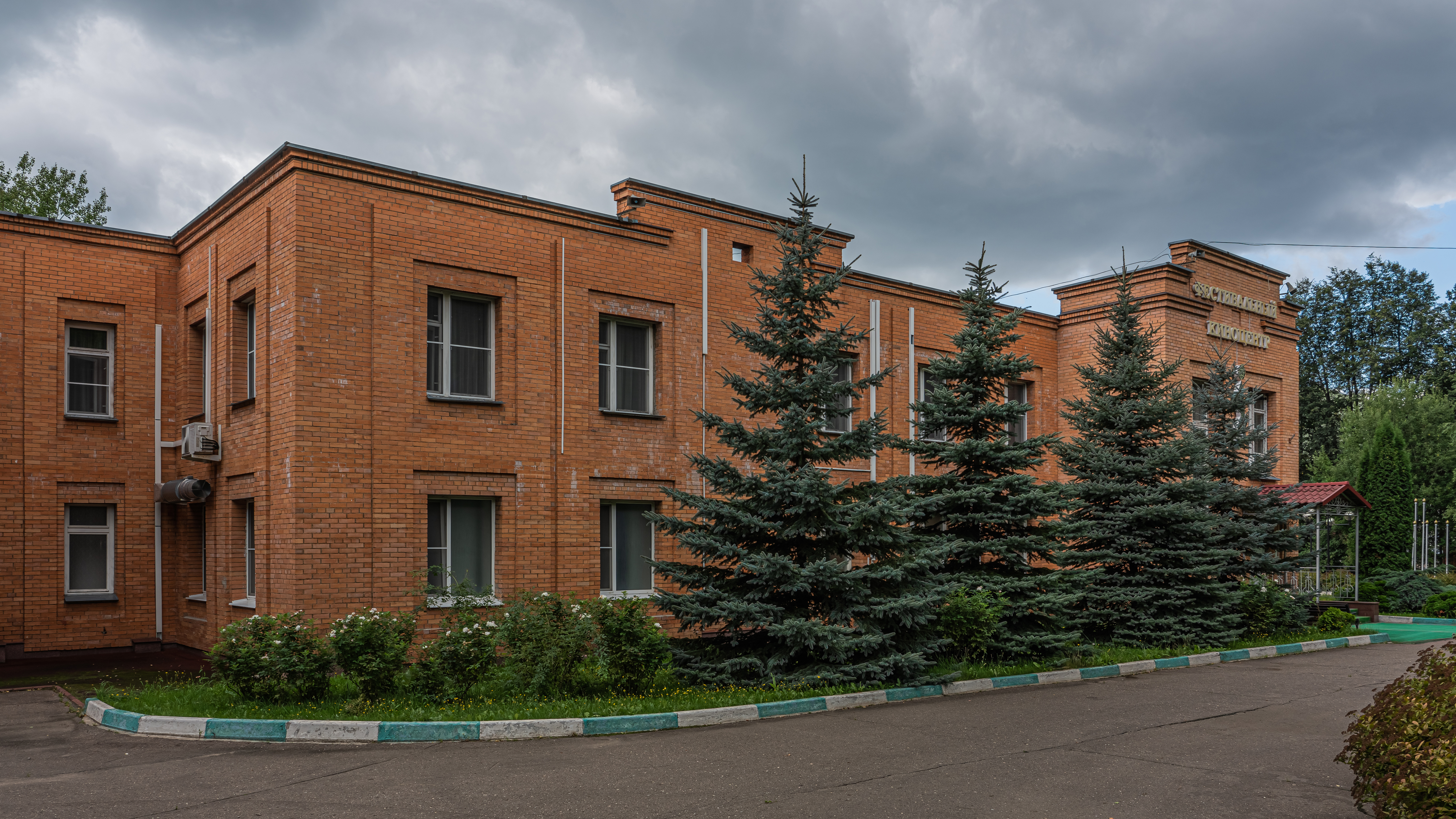
Festival building at Gosfilmofond

Since 1997, Gosfilmofond has been holding the Belye Stolby Festival. The festival takes place every year in the last week of January. The main objective of the festival is to show films from the state collection of the Russian Federation. The festival also shows new movies made on the basis of the Gosfilmofond's collection and films, using film materials from private collections and foreign national film archives.

The festival has no special jury. The winners of the festival are determined by secret voting of its participants and guests, including traditionally members of the Guild of Film Critics of Russia, historians and theorists of cinema, film journalists.

== See also ==
- List of film archives
