= Montbenon =

Square in Lausanne, Switzerland

Coordinates: 46°31′12″N 6°37′34″E

Esplanade de Montbenon
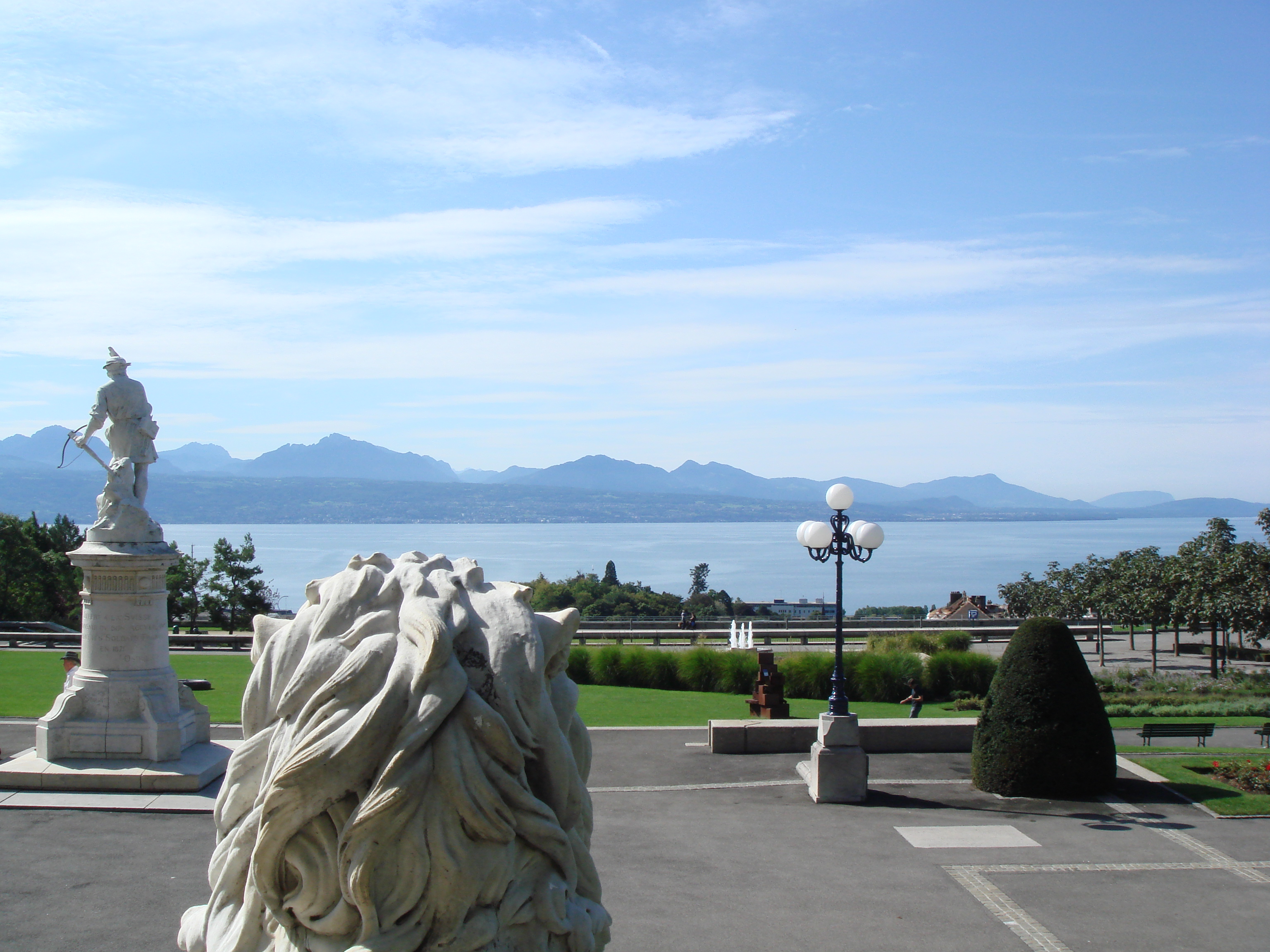

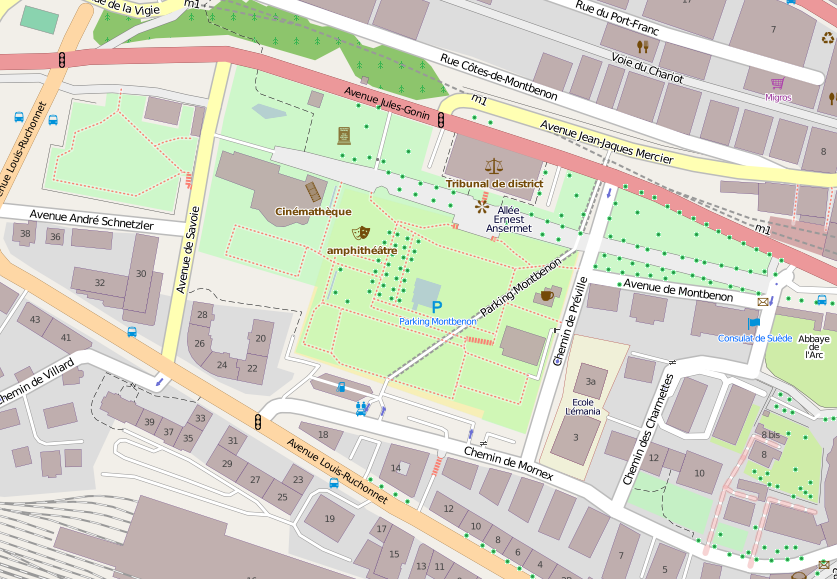
- Location: Lausanne, Switzerland
- Website: www.lausanne.ch

The Esplanade of Montbenon (French: Esplanade de Montbenon) is an area of the city of Lausanne (Switzerland). It is located in the centre of the city, to the south of Flon.

== Casino de Montbenon ==
The Casino de Montbenon was built in 1908. It hosted the headquarters of the International Olympic Committee from 1915 to 1922.

The Casino de Montbenon currently hosts the Swiss Film Archive, assembly halls and a restaurant (the Brasserie de Montbenon). The building contains the Cinématographe that serves as a movie theater for the Swiss Film Archive, the multi-use concert hall and movie theater Salle Paderewski as well as the Salle des fêtes, a large multi-use space that can host different kinds of events. Apart from the activities of the Swiss Film Archive, the Casino de Montbenon also hosts punctual events such as the Lausanne Underground Film and Music Festival, the jazz festival Jazz Onze+ and the film festival Festival cinémas d'Afrique Lausanne amongst others.

== Palais de justice ==
The Palais de justice de Montbenon ("Montbenon Law Courts") was built between 1881 and 1886 to host the Federal Supreme Court of Switzerland. In the 1920s, the Federal Supreme Court moved to the Parc de Mon Repos and the building currently hosts the Tribunal d'arrondissement de Lausanne.

== Gallery ==
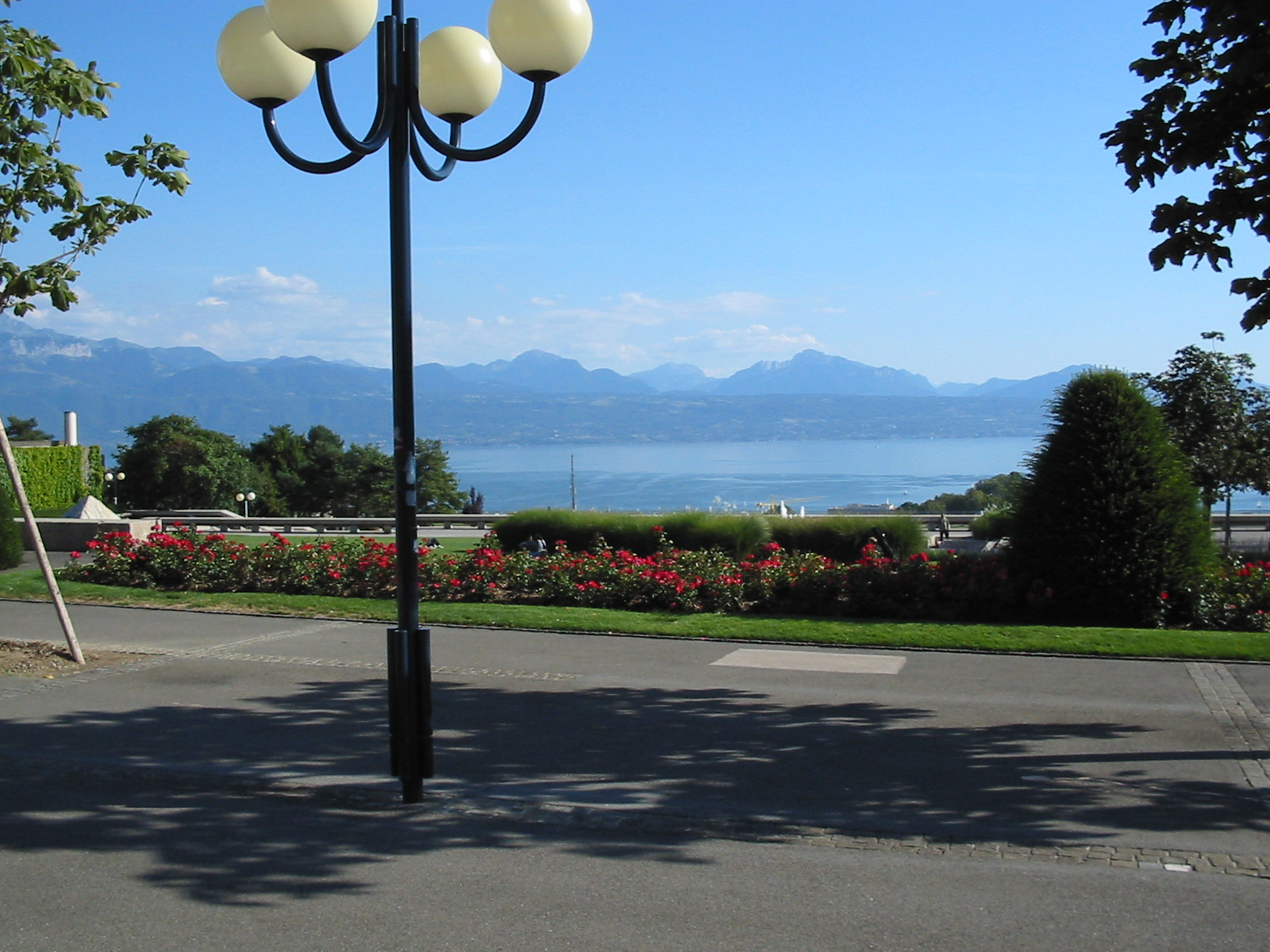
Montbenon and the view on Lake Léman

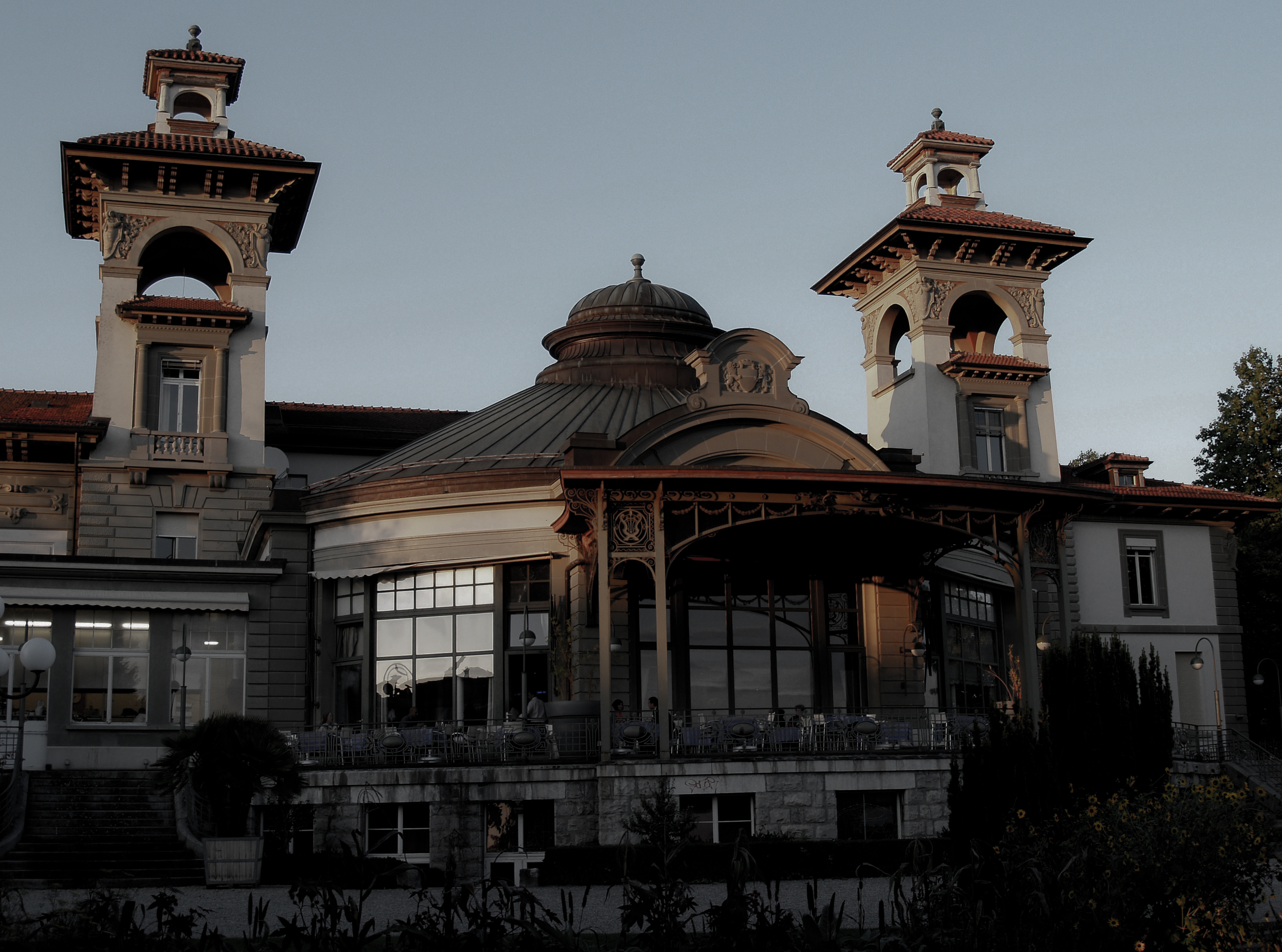
The Casino de Montbenon

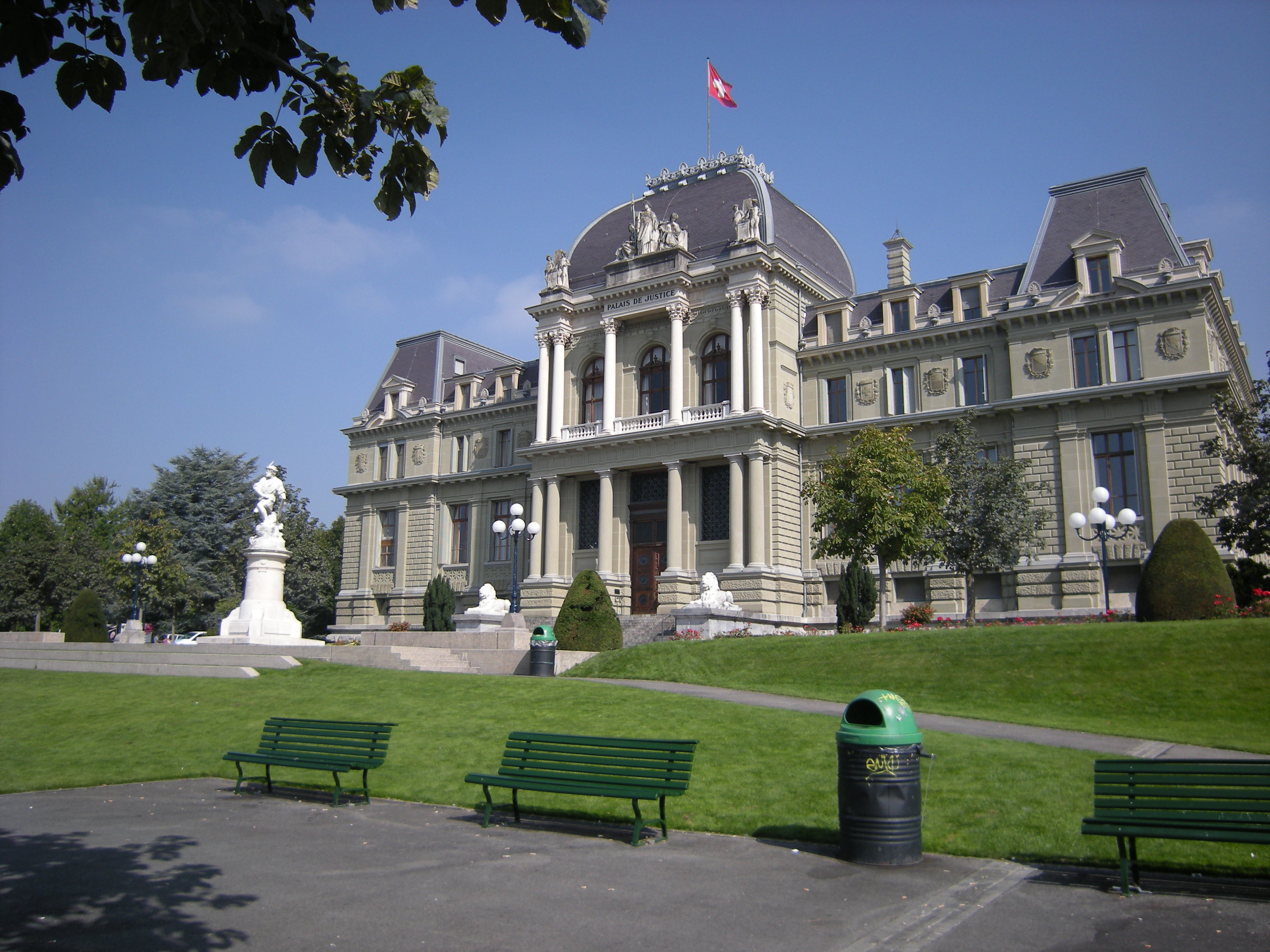
The Palais de justice de Montbenon

== See also ==
- List of cultural property of national significance in Switzerland: Vaud
