= Filmarchives online =

Film Archives Online is a web gateway providing easy access to moving image collections from various European film archives. It allows the search of a growing number of individual archival databases. Since February 2007, catalogue information on around 25.000 film works – mainly non-fiction material – is searchable in English, German, French, Italian, and Czech. The database is constantly growing. Where available, streaming videos and screenshots are provided with the respective film work entry.

As locating moving images is often a complex, time-consuming, and costly process, film archives online aim to simplify the access and distribution of archival films in Europe. The portal addresses user groups from professional media and film production to scientific research. Content, filmographic data, and physical characteristics can be used to search moving images. Search results provide available information about the existence and location of the materials. In addition to the search function, the website provides contact information to facilitate access to the moving image items and, if available, links to digital content available for online viewing.

Film archives online result from the MIDAS project (Moving Image Database for Access and Re-use of European Film Collections). MIDAS was initiated in January 2006 as a pilot project in the MEDIA Programme of the European Commission and ended in January 2009. It was coordinated by the Deutsches Filminstitut and other institutions dedicated to collecting and preserving the European film heritage. The consortium comprises eighteen institutions – among them the British Film Institute, Národní Filmový Archiv (Prague), the Cinémathèque Royale de Belgique (Brussels) and the DEFA Foundation.
