= Cinéma Capitole =

Historic movie theatre in Lausanne, Switzerland

Capitole
- Cinéma Capitole
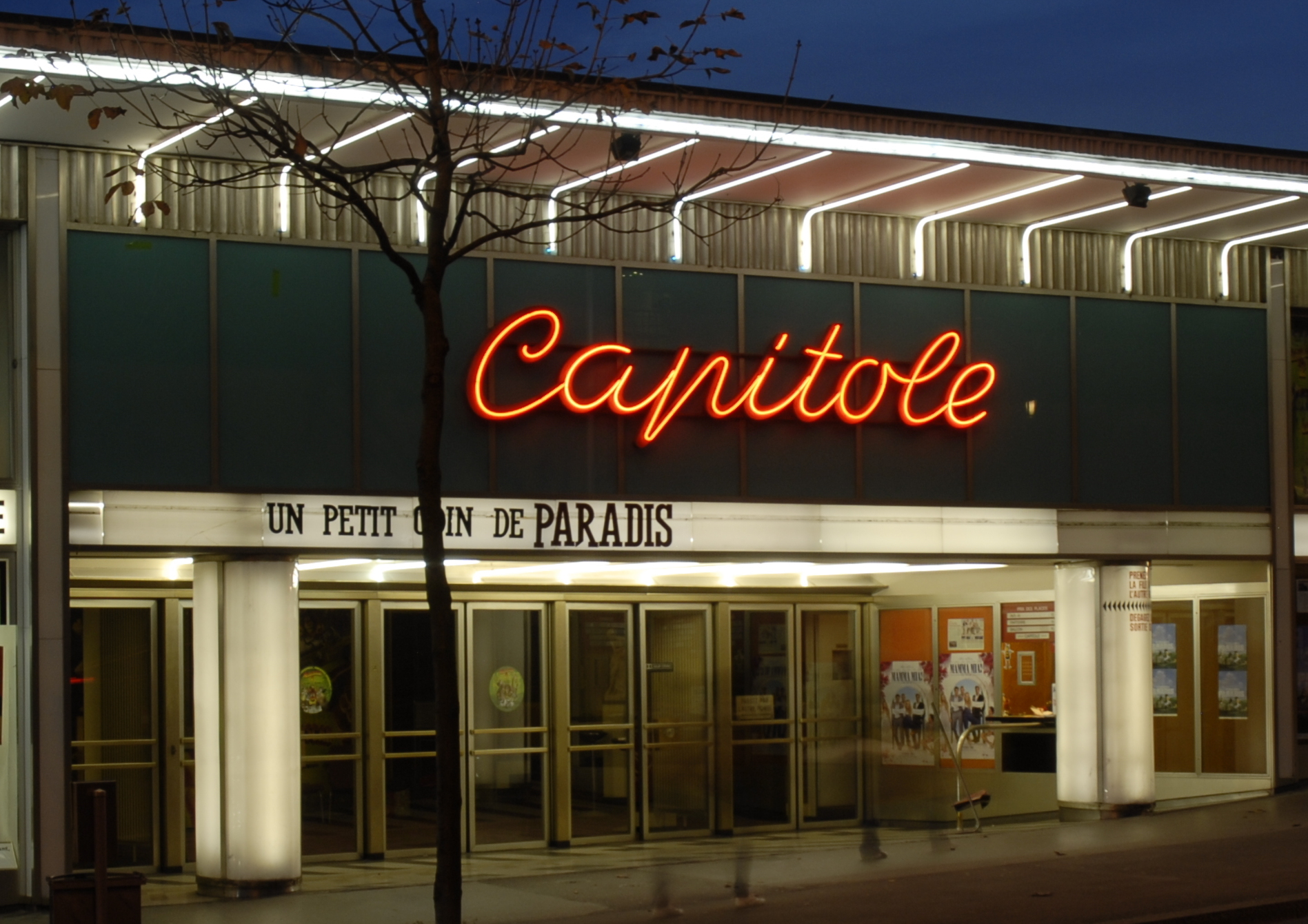
- Interactive map of Capitole
- Address: Avenue du Théâtre 6 Lausanne; Switzerland
- Coordinates: 46.5185°N 6.6357°E
- Operator: Swiss Film Archive
- Capacity: 736 (Buache room); 140 (Schnegg room)
- Type: Cinema

Construction
- Built: 1928
- Renovated: 1950s 2019-2024
- Architect: Charles Thévenaz

Website
- www.cinematheque.ch

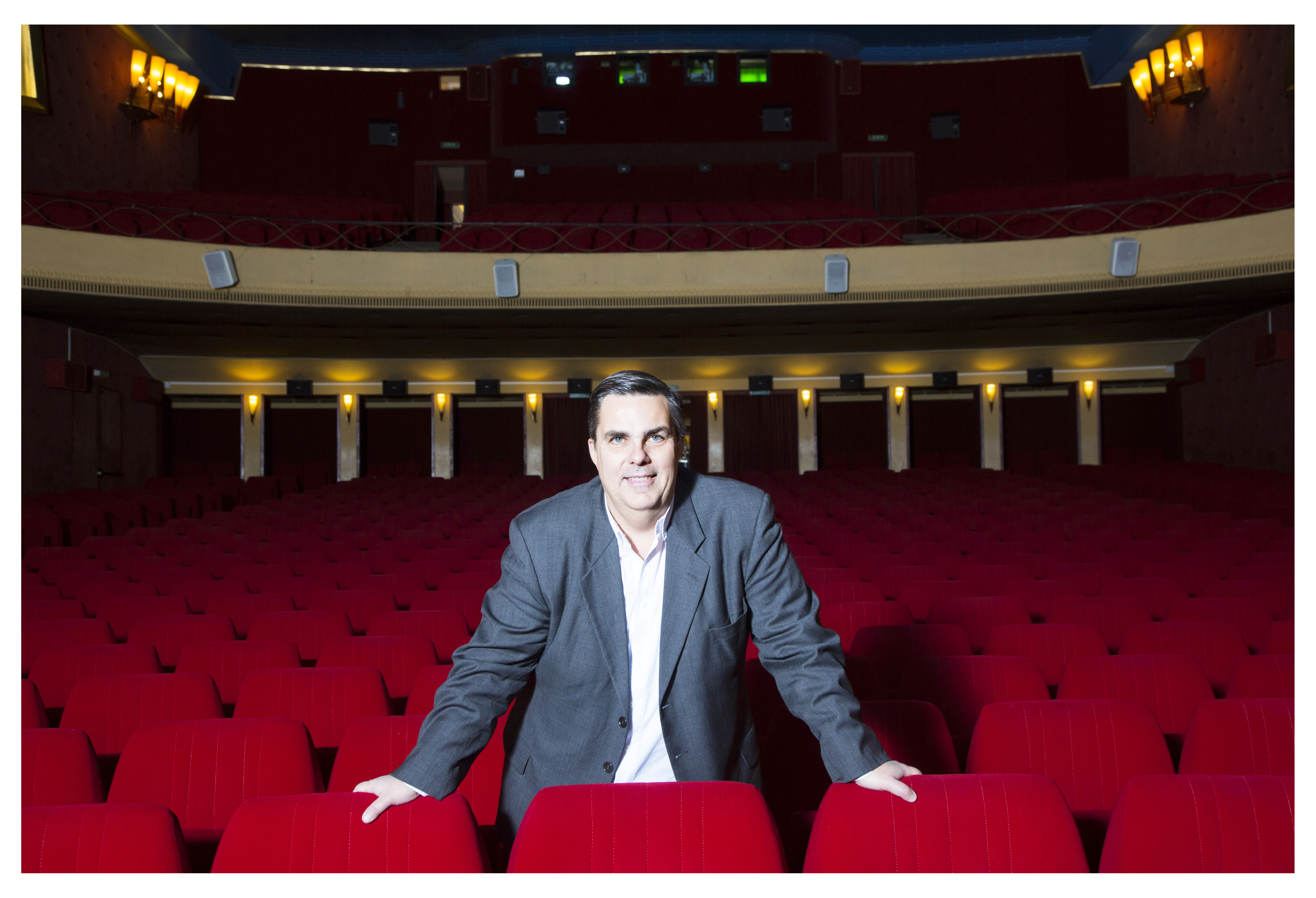
Frédéric Maire, director of the Swiss Film Archive, in the Capitole (2015)

The Capitole is a cinema in Lausanne, Switzerland, built in 1928. It is the oldest cinema in Lausanne and, with 718 seats, the largest cinema in operation in Switzerland. Since 2024, it has been operated by the Swiss Film Archive.

== History ==
=== 20th century ===
The building was constructed in 1928 by Charles Thévenaz in response to desires from the city to construct a cinema building. The first sound film was projected in 1930 (The Night Is Ours). In 1953, Switzerland’s first panoramic screen was installed in the Capitole.

The building was renovated in 1959 by Gérald Pauchard, which involved the modernization and redecoration of the building.

The Capitole had 1,077 in 1928 (802 in the ground floor and 275 on the balcony) and 869 seats before the 2024 renovation.

The theatre was owned by Lucienne Schnegg from 1981 until 2010. She herself had succeeded the previous owner, Matthias Köhn, of Luxembourg. Lucienne Schnegg was hired as a secretary of the cinema in the late 1940s. She never accepted to sell the theatre to developers – for her, it could never be anything other than a cinema.

=== 21st century ===
In 2010, the city of Lausanne purchased the movie theater to preserve it and make it available to the Swiss Film Archive. The cinema was renovated from December 2019 to February 2024. The cost of the renovation was estimated at around 18 million Swiss francs, the final cost was 22 millions. The existing architectural and decorative were restored and a second projection room was built, with 140 seats, below the historical room.

== See also ==
- Cinema of Switzerland
- Swiss Film Archive
