= State Archives of the Republic of North Macedonia =

National archive of North Macedonia

- Државен архив на Република Северна Македонија; Državen arhiv na Republika Severna Makedonija
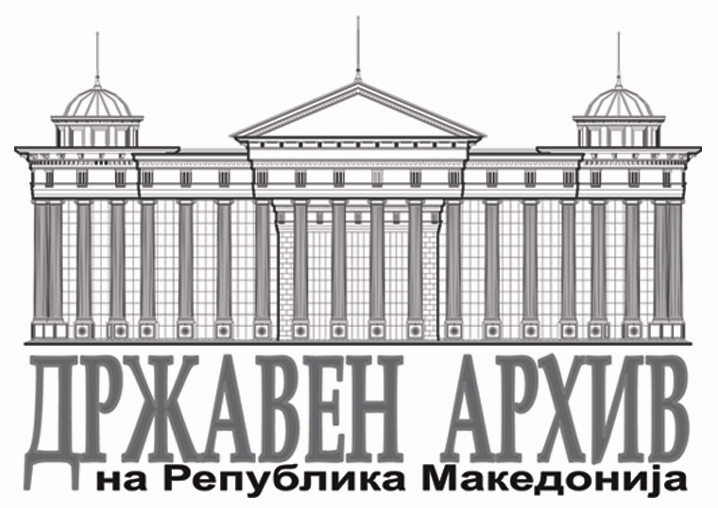

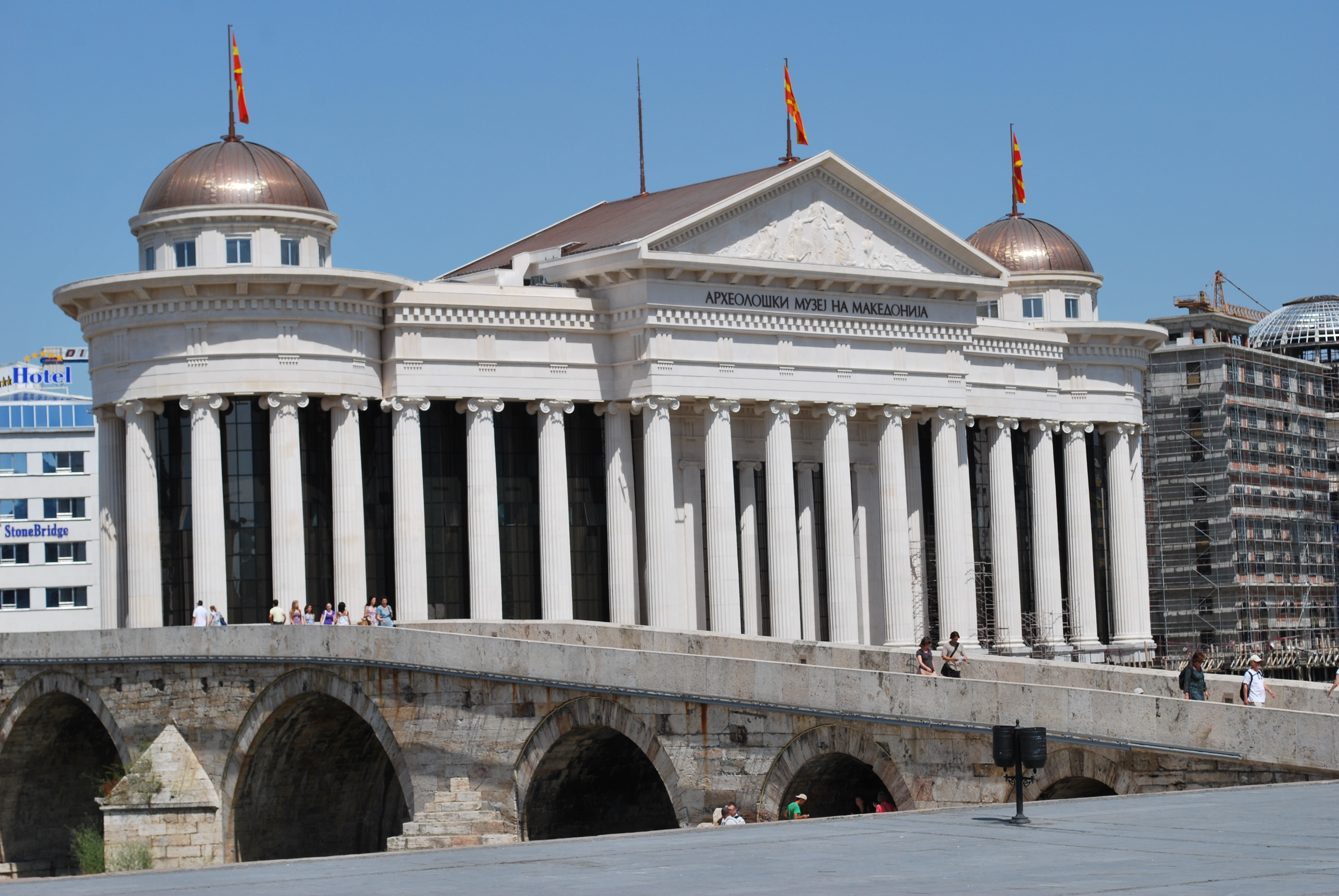
- Established: 1946
- Location: Skopje, Macedonia
- Coordinates: 41.996836°N 21.434261°E
- Type: National archive
- Website: www.arhiv.gov.mk

The State Archives of the Republic of North Macedonia, formerly known as the State Archives of the Republic of Macedonia (DARM) are the national archives of North Macedonia. It is located in Skopje in North Macedonia.

== History ==
Beginning in 1926, records of Macedonian history were held under the direct management of the National Archives of Serbia in the State Archives of Skopje. On May 3, 1945, the People's Liberation Army of Macedonia announced its intention to establish an Archive of the National Liberation Movement. On May 31, 1946, the Ministry of Public Education of the Socialist Republic of Macedonia established a coalition for the collection of archival materials pertaining to Macedonian history .

Inspired by similar legislation in Yugoslavia, the National Assembly of the People's Republic of Macedonia adopted the "Law on State Archives of Macedonia" of 1951. This formally established the State Archives of the Republic of Macedonia The archive was located in the former State Archives of Skoplje.

Between 1953 and 1960, nine regional archives were established in the cities of Bitola, Kumanovo, Ohrid, Prilep, Skopje, Strumica, Tetovo, Veles and Stip.In 1990, the newly establishe Law on Archival Material saw the regional archives become units of the State Archives network.The central branch of the State Archive holds jurisdiction over the creators and holders of the archival material of national rank. Offices for bilateral cooperation, research and publication are organized only in the central branch of the Archive, which also houses conservation laboratory, microfilming laboratory, and a bookbinding workshop.

The Archive has changed names several times since its founding in 1951. Beginning in 1965, it was commonly referred to as the Archives of Macedonia. In 2000, the name changed to State Archives of the Republic of Macedonia. Since 2019, the institution has been referred to as the State Archives of the Republic of North Macedonia.

== See also ==
- List of archives in North Macedonia
