= Maurus Gerner-Beuerle =

German Lutheran theologian

- Born: Maurus Wilibald Beuerle; 28 January 1903; Hausen im Wiesental (Lörrach), Baden, Germany
- Died: 10 August 1982 (aged 79); Bremen, German Federal Republic (West Germany)
- Occupations: Lutheran Pastor; Cathedral Dean; Christian preacher; Author; Poet
- Spouse: Erna Moritz (1905–2004)
- Children: 4

Maurus Gerner-Beuerle (28 January 1903 – 10 August 1982) was a German Lutheran theologian and pastor who served for many years as the "Domprediger" at Bremen Cathedral. (Note: There is no very direct translation into English of "Domprediger": the term "cathedral dean" is sometimes used.) His gifts as a narrator and as a preacher, along with his commitment to truth led to his becoming one of the best known Christian preachers of the post-war generation in West Germany. He was, in addition, an author and poet. Much of his published work appeared in German, but some was written and published, at least partially, in the Alemannic he had learned as a child in South Baden.

== Life ==
=== Provenance and early years ===
Maurus Wilibald Beuerle was born and grew up in the village Hausen im Wiesental, a short distance up the valley from Lörrach, in the extreme south-west of Germany. He was the third-born of his parents' four recorded children. He was born into a Protestant family: his father, Oskar Beuerle (1867-1952), served as the village pastor between 1901 and 1933. He attended the "Realschule" (secondary school) at the neighbouring village of Schopfheim. He acquired his double name when he was 18, after he was adopted by a newly widowed cousin of his mother's, Sophie Christina Betz. The cousin had been born Sophie Christina Gerner, however, and presumably reverted to using her pre-marriage name. Her new adoptee, Maurus Beuerle, now became Maurus Gerner-Beuerle.

He completed the secondary school curriculum and passed his "Abitur" (school final exams) in 1922, with supplementary passes in Latin and Greek. Under normal circumstances this would have opened the way to university level education, but Gerner-Beuerle was very unsure of his future career path and in no hurry to decide. Despite being the son of a church minister, and having already thought extensively about religion as he was growing up, the last thing on his mind was a university theology course spent studying formulaic sermons authored by eminent churchmen in the past. For some months after leaving school he worked in the village as a brick layer and as a carpenter.

=== Student ===
He embarked on his university career in 1923. Between 1923 and 1930 he studied at the universities of Heidelberg, Kiel, Tübingen and Marburg. It is apparent that he was still agonising about his long-term career trajectory: initially he enrolled for a "free study" course of the Philosophy Faculty, allowing for a maximum choice between study topics. His decision to focus on Theology owed much to the unconventional Protestant theologian Johannes Müller. The encouragement came initially from Müller's writings and later from meeting Müller. The two became friends and, in matters of Theology, allies. During the 1920s and 1930s Gerner-Beuerle suffered several bouts of serious ill-health which seems at times to have delayed his studies. During the 1920s he suffered from Pleurisy and, according to one source, was incapacitated by Tuberculosis between 1925 and 1927. When he was away from university, much of his time was spent at Schloss Elmau, the theological hostel-retreat that Müller had opened near Garmisch during the war years. It was also at that Maurus Gerner-Beuerle met Erna Moritz (1905–2004), who was working a stint as a "Haustochter" (very loosely, "trainee housekeeper") and whom he later married. During his student years he spent a term in Finland under a student exchange scheme. He also found opportunities for visits to Franconia, Italy, Estonia, Sweden and Norway. Towards the end of the 1920s he was employed by Müller as a "house tutor" at the Schloss Elmau retreat. Klaus Schubring, who has studied his life in some detail, points out that Gerner-Beuerle never became part of any wider literary movement or circle. But as his reputation spread, he did come to be viewed by admirers as a "disciple" of Johannes Müller, the man who had "understood him the best".

=== Ordination and ministry ===
The final part of Gerner-Beuerle's university-level education was completed at the Theology Seminary at Heidelberg. Having passed his Level I National Exams in 1927, he now completed his Level II National Exams in 1930. Following brief "vicariates" (in parish traineeships) at Wertheim and Karlsruhe, on 31 March 1931 he was ordained into the ministry at his home church in Hausen im Wiesental. No doubt Oskar Beuerle, who was still the pastor in charge, was filled with fatherly pride. The passion with which the son used his inaugural sermon to relate his inner development and to lay before his listeners his pastoral goals was very much at variance with the father's customary approach, however.

Following ordination he served as a semi-itinerant "diaspora minister", filling in for absences at various rural Baden parishes, before being installed in his first more permanent parish position at Sankt Blasien, some 25 km / 15 miles north of Waldshut and the Swiss border. His incumbency ran from 1932 till 1938. At Sankt Blasien he ran into difficulties. The prayer room that the congregation had formerly used had recently ceased to be available, and there was a pressing need to organise the construction of a little Protestant church for the congregation to use. Sankt Blasien was home to a powerful Jesuit school (which would be closed down by the government in 1939). There was inherent scope for divisions between Catholics and Protestants in the village, while both church communities had faced a new set of pressures and threats since the National Socialists had taken power across Germany in 1933 and rapidly transformed Germany into a one- party dictatorship. For Gerner-Beuerle there was an urgent need to raise funds for the construction of a new church. Meanwhile, it was also at Sankt Blasien that on 12 May 1935 his mother died of cancer, aged only 57. Before there had been time to make very much progress on the new church his Tuberculosis returned. Between 1936 and 1937 Maurus Gerner-Beuerle was obliged to take a prolonged cure, locked away from all contact for several months at a sanatorium with Specialist physicians in Davos. After that there was a further protracted period of convalescence at Schloss Elmau in Upper Bavaria. The treatment evidently worked: for forty years between 1936 and 1976 he was spared further health crises. But in during his absence from Sankt Blasien the parish council had become appallingly split over the funding for the proposed new Protestant church. Leading the opposition was Karl Bronner, the proprietor of a small shop in the parish and a Hitlerite extremist. Another villager, Ferdinand Odenheimer, promised to make a substantial cash donation. Odenheimer was also the proprietor of a shop, but it was a large one. Of greater significance, given that antisemitic racism had become a core underpinning of government strategy since 1933, was that Ferdinand Odenheimer was Jewish. It may have been as early as 1933, and was almost certainly before the parish council had had any opportunity to accept the gift offered by Odenheimer, that Karl Bronner lodged an objection to the possibility that it might be accepted. Regional church leaders were called in and prevaricated, seeking to impose various conditions that were either difficult or else impossible to meet. As the local minister, Gerner-Beuerle was forbidden by the church hierarchy from involving himself in the dispute. It is clear from his letters that he had already taken a firm opinion in favour of accepting Odenheimer's cash, however, and it is likely that parish councillors were not kept entirely in the dark as to their church minister's view of the matter. In 1936 Gerner-Beuerle applied for a "loft conversion" upper floor to be added to the apartment which he shared with his wife (whom he had married in 1932) and children (the first of whom was born in 1933). The parish council and the regional church leadership, delighted to find a simple question on which they could both agree, jointly turned down his request. That same year the parish council formally lodged a complaint against their minister. A further blow was the discovery that his vicar (deputy), Wolfgang Lorenz, was "scheming" against him. The new church was nevertheless consecrated on 13 December 1936. By this time Gerner-Beuerle was starting to look for a new position.

=== Bremen ===
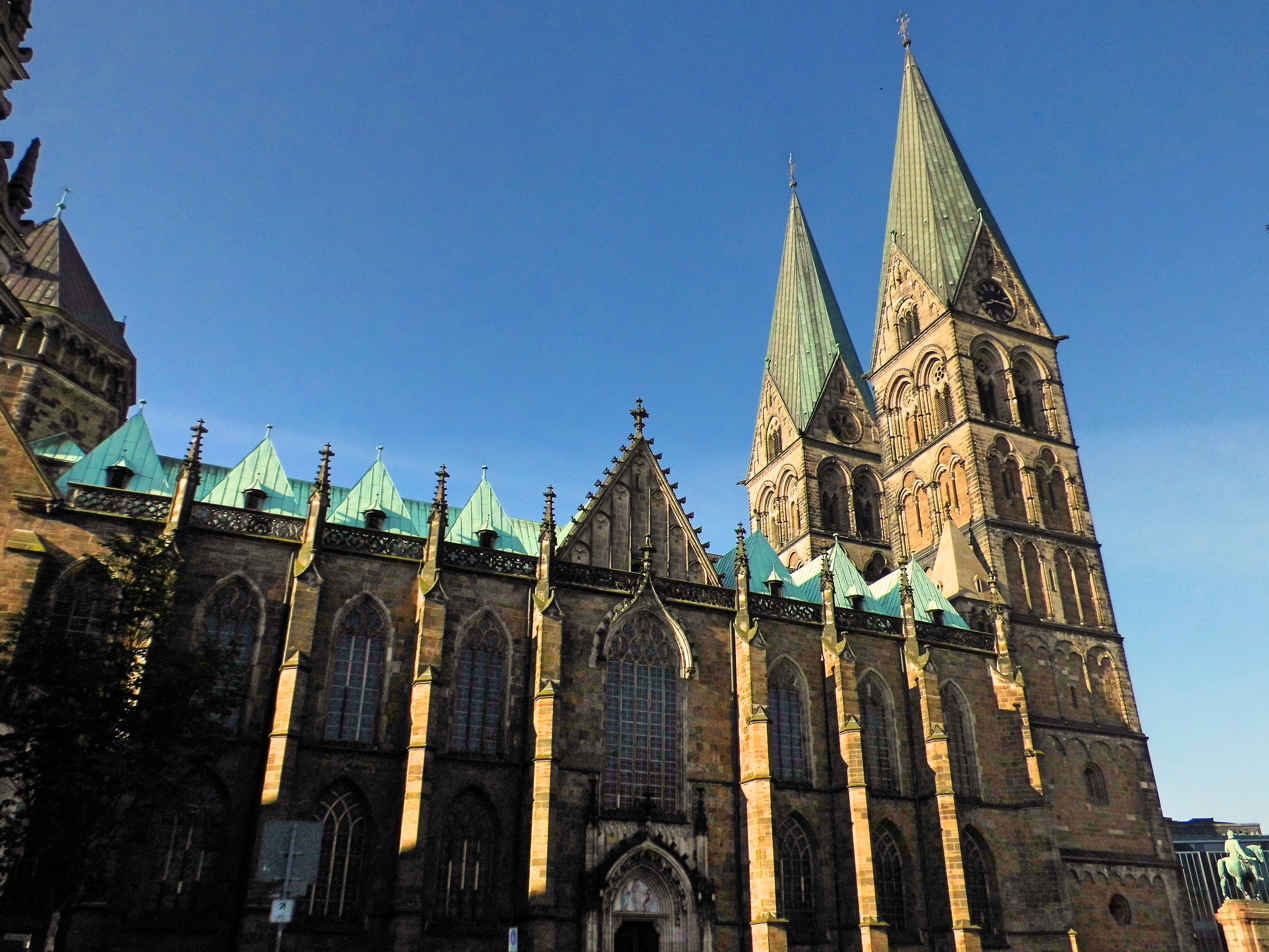
Bremen Cathedral

It was during a visit by Hermann Rahm, who had been the Protestant minister in charge of the parish at Sankt Blasien between 1915 and 1923, and was now in charge at another parish nearby, that the suggestion came up that Gerner-Beuerle should apply for a job at Bremen, far to the north. He was offered and accepted a post, and during 1938 moved to Bremen with his family. His first job in Bremen was as pastor to the congregation in the city's "Hohentor" quarter, where the sudden arrest of the previous incumbent and his resignation from the church ministry had opened up an unexpected vacancy. Gerner-Beuerle lived through the hard years of the war at the side of his congregation. The quarter of the city near the city and alongside the river suffered badly in the aerial bomb attacks of the 1940s. The recently built Hohentor church was completely burnt out and collapsed. At this point Gerner-Beuerle seriously contemplated signing up for army service, but instead he stayed where he was till 1946, when he accepted an appointment at the cathedral. Much to the displeasure of the parish church council, when Gerner-Beuerle moved to the cathedral as "Domprediger", which is only a ten minute walk from the Hohentor parish, many of his congregation went with him. The role involved a combination of administrative and pastoral duties and also, especially in Gerner Beuerle's case, offered ample opportunity for preaching. He remained in the job from 1946 till his retirement in 1971.

The difficult years of immediate post-war period marked the high point of Gerner-Beuerle's hands-on pastoral role. He could come up to a crowd of people who had been pushed aside, while united more closely together through their shared hunger and the cold, and speak well-chosen words of consolation necessary to renew their self-confidence. His sermons were discussed on the streets and in the trams, and sometimes were even aired on the local radio, which meant having to contend with American military censorship. (Note: Although the north-west of Germany had ended up under British military occupation, Bremen and an enclave surrounding it, including the strategically critical port facilities, was placed under American military occupation between 1945 and 1949.) The first booklet of his sermons appeared as early as 1947, subjected to censorship. During the 1950s and 1960s, as material conditions improved, he continued to serve the city folk as a tireless pastor, a patient listener and a highly esteemed preacher.

Maurus Gerner-Beuerle suffered a severe stroke in 1976. His mental faculties were unaffected, but he never fully recovered his physical powers. He died at Bremen on 10 August 1982.

His body is buried with that of his wife and other near relatives in a family grave at the Riensberger Cemetery, which is situated between the city centre to the south and the concrete university campus to the north.

== God's work ==
Gerner-Beuerle engaged with many of the religious and ideological currents of the age. Nevertheless, Communism and National Socialism in action are largely left to one side in his written output. Political issues on which he chose to take a stand tended to be those involving the internal politics of the church. An early example came in the 1930s in the backwash from the "Odenheimer affair" cited above. Beyond church politics, experiencing God in this world and following Christ were the central preoccupations that Gerner-Beuerle preferred to share with readers and listeners. In 1942 he abruptly took hold of all the hymn books he could find and ripped out from each the page naming the "Bishop" of Bremen. It turned out he had been made aware of the various transgressions imputed to Bishop Weidemann (who had been a party member since 1933). What seems to have weighed most heavily with Gerner-Beuerle was that the bishop had persuaded a secretary to render false testimony while under oath.

Some years later, in 1949, he found himself delivering a funeral address for a suicide victim. He asserted that the works council of the Bremen tram operators shared in responsibility for the tragedy. The works council had blocked the man's re-instatement in his job following a political rehabilitation. The works council reacted with a very public attack on Gerner-Beuerle, who prepared to defend his reputation in a court action.

== Poet and author ==
Maurus Gerner-Beuerle frequently published individual poems, starting in 1921 when he was still trying to make up his mind about whether to enrol as a university student. In 1934 he published "Radegunde von Thüringen", an invigoratingly crafted first novel based on what is known (or might be inferred) of the sixth century princess and Christian benefactress Radegund. In the judgement of at least one critic the narrative went too far in presenting in simplistic terms the absolute contrast between absolute evil and angelic purity.

In 1971 he published the autobiographical prose work "Im Hebeldorf Huuse, mym Chinderland". It was written in Alemannic, but the dialect was applied in a way that made it more or less readable for German speakers. It comprised a series of tales and pranks from the author's boyhood, and was published with a short essay entitled "Worum i Pfarrer worde bi" ("Why I became a [Christian] minister"). He had already published his "Autumn Collection" volume in 1965, consisting of a collection of his poems, some in the standard German of that time and some in Alemannic. The prose compendium of stories from his youth and the poetry volume together led to Gerner-Beuerle becoming the winner of the 1971 Johann-Peter-Hebel-Plakette literary award.

The Johann-Peter-Hebel award is organised by the parish council of Hausen im Wiesental in celebration of the village's most famous son, whose father had worked as a weaver there during the winters in the 1760s. The Dialectal poet himself later lived there for many years. It is not impossible that Maurus Gerner-Beuerle's own close connections with the village played their part in his receipt of the award in 1971. The village authorities followed up the award with strong backing for the publication of a second volume of Gerner-Beuerle's German of that time and Alemannic poets. "Herrgottsbrünnli" was published locally in 1980. The poems in it again drew primarily on the author's boyhood years. Thus encouraged, during his final years the poet pastor bombarded the parish council with more poetry, much of which had been written long ago, but some of which was newly written. There would be no more literary awards, however.

In 1995 Gerner=Beuerle's widow Erna published "Mein Weg zur Domkanzel" (loosely, "My path to the cathedral pulpit"), a compilation of extracts from his diaries and correspondence covering the years from 1917 to 1971.

Gerner-Beuerle's narrative abilities are beyond question: there is an obvious overlap between his published work and his gifts as a preacher. Many of the poems are examples of "Gelegenheitsdichtung" (loosely, "Occasional poetry"), albeit without overt commercial motivation. Many express a love for a distant illuminated vision of homeland (conflated with the poet's childhood). There are carefully shaped pearls on love. Of course there are prayers, poems of worship and laments against war. His printed output also includes many hectographed sermons and individually printed articles, appearing in church publications such as the "Dom Nachrichten" published by Bremen Cathedral, and in mainstream regional newspapers such as the Bremer Nachrichten and the Weser Kurier. There are many other written pieces that were never published, but are retained as an archive by Gerner-Beuerle's estate. There are hundreds of letters testifying to his prolific letter writing. Gerner-Beuerle sorted these himself. There are sets of letters from members of the congregations at each of the three parishes in which he served, and others from friends, from members of the community at Elmau, from his longtime mentor Johannes Müller, from family members and from the well-known personalities he had come across.
