= Johannes Müller (theologian) =

German Protestant theologian (1864–1949)

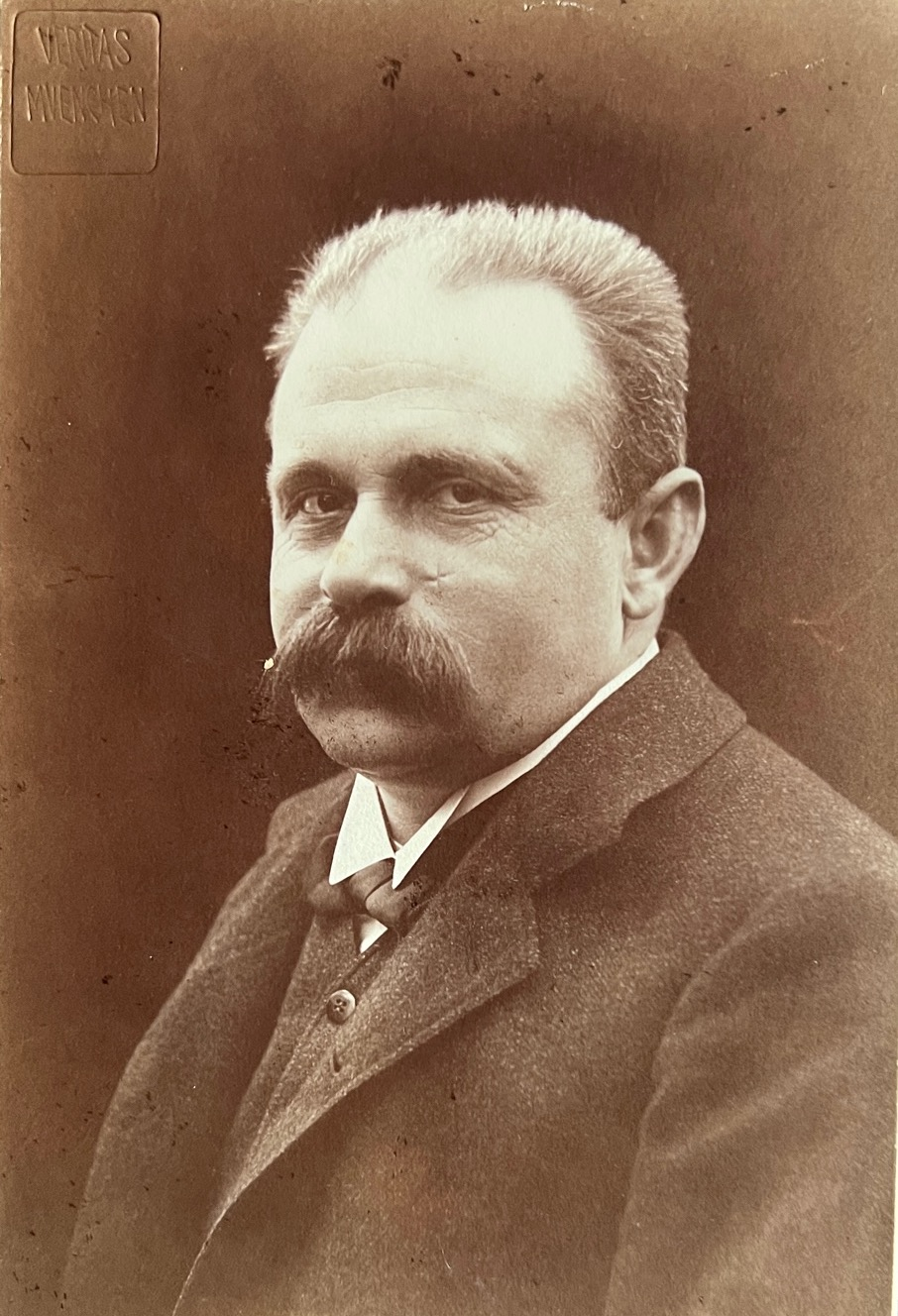
- Born: 19 April 1864; Riesa, Saxony, Germany
- Died: 4 January 1949 (aged 84); Elmau, Bavaria, US occupation zone
- Education: Leipzig; Erlangen
- Occupations: Lutheran theologian Author; Communal living pioneer
- Spouse(s): 1. 1891: Sophia v. Römer; 2. 1900: Marianne Fiedler (1864–1904); 3. 1905: Irene Sattler (1880–1957)
- Children: Hans Michael Müller (1901–1989); Marianne "Manne" Müller (1904–2006); Eberhard Müller-Elmau (1905–1995); Dietrich Müller (1908–1943); Gudrun Richardsen (1910–2007); Sieglinde Mesirca (1915–2009); Bernhard Müller-Elmau (1916–2007); Ingrid Brooke (1919–2010); Wolfgang Müller (1923-1944) and others
- Parent(s): Johann Gottfried Lobegott Müller (1833–1905); Christiane Friedericke Dölitzsch (1833–1893)

Johannes Müller (19 April 1864 – 4 January 1949) was an unconventional German Protestant theologian.

== Life ==
=== Provenance and early years ===
Johannes Müller was born in Riesa, a small town located a short distance down-river from Dresden. He was born into a revivalist family. His parents had met in a pietist community.

His father, Johann Gottfried Lobegott Müller (1833–1905), was a school master and also a cantor and an organist. His paternal grandfather was another school master. His mother, born Christiane Friedericke Dölitzsch (1833–93), came from a farming family in nearby Mautitz. Between the ages of four and nine Johannes Müller was struck down with Poliomyelitis, becoming completely paralysed and confined to his bed when he was seven. However, after the doctors had given up any hope of improvement in his condition he did, slowly, recover. He later described his years of debilitating childhood illness as particularly happy and powerfully formative in terms of an ability to absorb information and impressions. When he was twelve he went to live with his grandparents in Dresden where he attended secondary school.

=== Student years ===
Müller moved on to study philosophy and Lutheran theology at Leipzig University in 1884. His tutors included Franz Delitzsch. He also studied as a student at Erlangen University where he became a member of a Wingolf student fraternity. In 1890 he received his doctorate in philosophy. His attempt to gain a doctorate in theology the following year failed on account of profound theological differences with his assessors at the Leipzig University Faculty of Theology, however. In 1889 he became Mission Secretary of the Evangelical-Lutheran National Association for Missions to Israel ("Evangelisch-lutherischen Zentralvereins für Mission unter Israel"), as the organisation was known at that time. He presented a proposal that its proselytising highighting individual Jewish sages should be replaced with a peoples' mission which would provide for the recognition of Israel as a single overarching entity in unity with Jesus as Messiah. He drew inspiration from the ideas of Joseph Rabinowitz. The management committee were not persuaded, however, and at the end of 1892 Johannes Müller's resignation was accepted.

After the unconventional conclusion to his university career, Müller showed himself to be largely unencumbered by the traditional boundaries of theological belief, giving stimulating public talks on questions of faith and life in ways that managed to fill lecture halls in Germany and nearby countries. Conventional church teaching held that nature was the well-spring of sin and immorality. Having identified and defined his target in this way, Müller went on to reject it as cold-hearted and anti-life ("gefühlskalt und lebensfeindlich"). He condemned "aloof" thought, incorporating, some believed, the language of "gutter antisemitism" in his presentations.

=== Printing years ===
Müller's adolescence and student years furnished him with a powerful but in many ways representative "fin de siècle" intellect. In the end he would publish more than 40 books. Soon he was filling 1,000 seat evangelical halls with his perorations, and in 1897 he teamed up with Heinrich Lhotzky to publish his own journal, the periodical "Blätter zur Pflege des persönlichen Lebens" ("Pages on taking care of the individual life"). It was renamed "Grünen Blätter" ("Green leaves/pages") in 1914 (and then withdrawn in 1941 due to paper shortages). Müller's many written pieces are today sometimes seen in the wider context of the so-called Judenmission (loosely "Mission to the Jews") as foreshadowing the political antisemitism that led to the Holocaust. With his continuing high-profile public activity as a "religious intellectual", he campaigned for a new free Christianity, and it was this that provided a personal justification for his own freelance existence. His ideas were translated into several languages and found a resonance with many educated fellow citizens, with the "unchurched educated" ("entkirchlichten Gebildeten"), and with adherents of the Cultural Protestantism movement who were engaged in reinventing Christianity for a modern industrial age.

He was in close personal contact with Heinrich Diesman (1863–1927), a "populist" theoretician. He engaged with the newly fashionable branch of science known as Eugenics, and the application in literature and philosophy of the "degeneration phenomena". Müller bemoaned a "direct national danger" predicated on the decline in marriage among educated circles. Women would thereby remain deprived of the fulfillment of their "central role as women" ("ihres ... eigentlichen Frauenberufs"). Massive immigration from Poland, Russia and Bohemia was degrading "our nation". What remained unexplained for Müller and his readers was the way that a "heightened sensitivity to the upheavals of modernity, a turbocharged vitality, and possibly even genius religiosity, alongside a number of liberal convictions, could go hand in hand with a brazenly populist ideology. After 1918, Müller shared the conviction, widespread among political conservatives, that the Weimar policies and constitutional structure lacked legitimacy. His critics imply that it was only the régime change of 1933 that addressed those concerns, although others point out that prior to that point Johannes Müller had "ignored completely" Adolf Hitler and his movement.

=== From Mainberg to Elmau ===
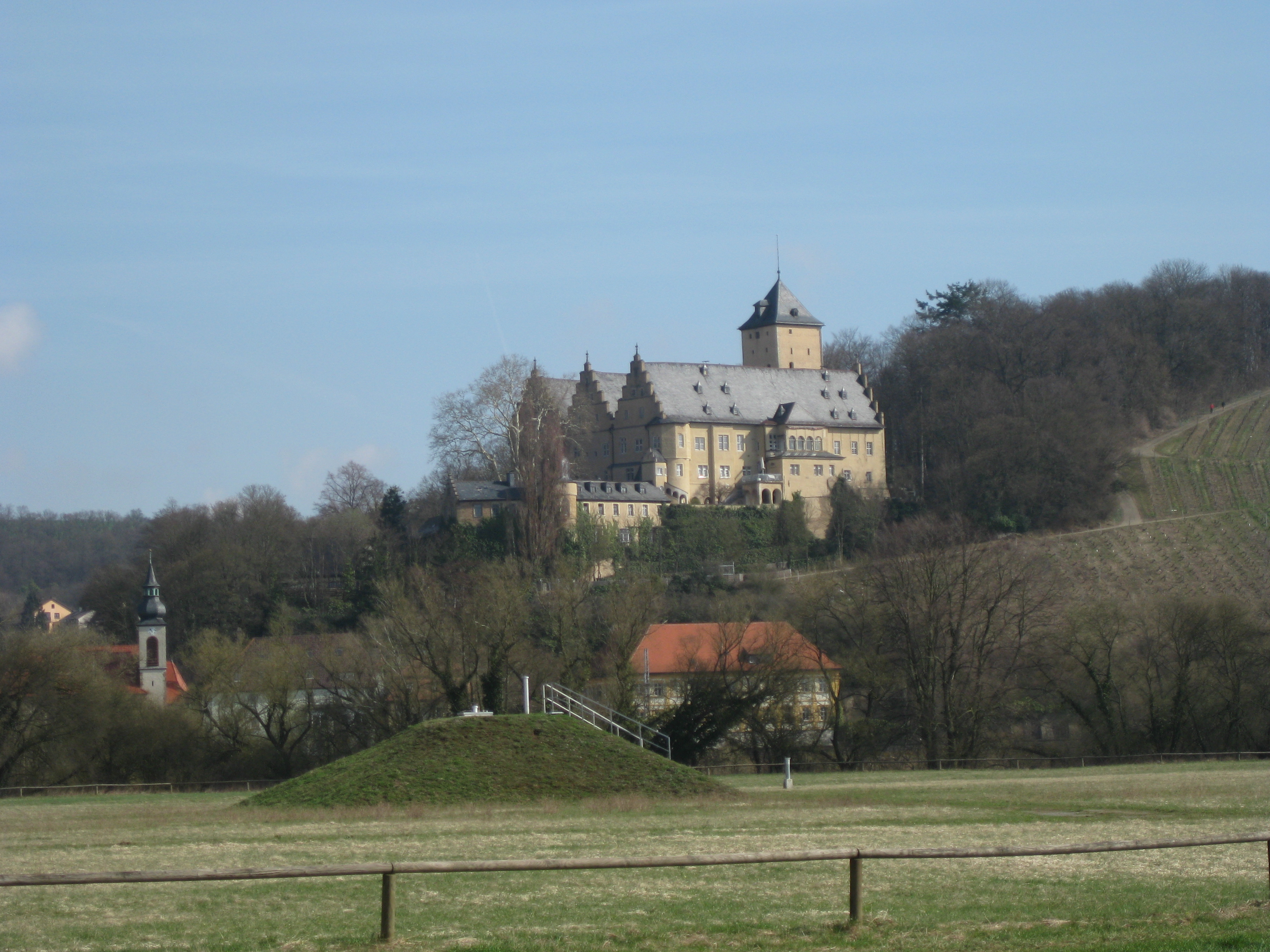
Schloss Mainberg 2010

In 1903 Müller and Heinrich Lhotzky set up a "care home for personal life" ("Pflegestätte persönlichen Lebens") in Castle Mainberg at Schweinfurt in the hill-country east of Frankfurt. The centre became a meeting point for their readers and friends. Support came from a wide and disparate range of backers, reflecting Müller's public profile at the time. They included the cookie magnate, Hermann Bahlsen, the Gutehoffnungshütte heiress, Elsa von Michael, the Count of Solms-Laubach, Walter Luetgebrune, later known as a lawyer for right-wing extremists. Others were the Social Democrat politician Anton Fendrich, the future resistance fighter Elisabeth von Thadden, the musician Wilhelm Kempff, the politician Arnold Bergsträsser, the publisher Oscar Beck along with the literary polymaths Wilhelm Langewiesche and Korfiz Holm. The castle had been placed at Müller's disposal by the industrialist Alexander Erbslöh, a friend who had been persuaded to buy it for the purpose. In 1912 it was recorded that the average stay at the establishment lasted for 13.7 days. Müller introduced special one-week seminar sessions at reduced price for students: the next year the same deal was made available to theologians and teachers. Some stayed for as long as two months. However, Alexander Erbslöh now declined to provide further funding, while at the same time Müller received an undertaking of substantial financial support from Elsa von Michael, generally known to posterity by her subsequent title as Elsa Countess of Waldersee. She was a daughter of the fabulously wealthy Haniel family. The result was that in 1912 Johannes Müller acquired the run-down Elmau estate, hidden away at the end of a long lane in the mountains between Partenkirchen and Mittenwald, and located barely twenty kilometers to the east of Germany's highest mountain peak.

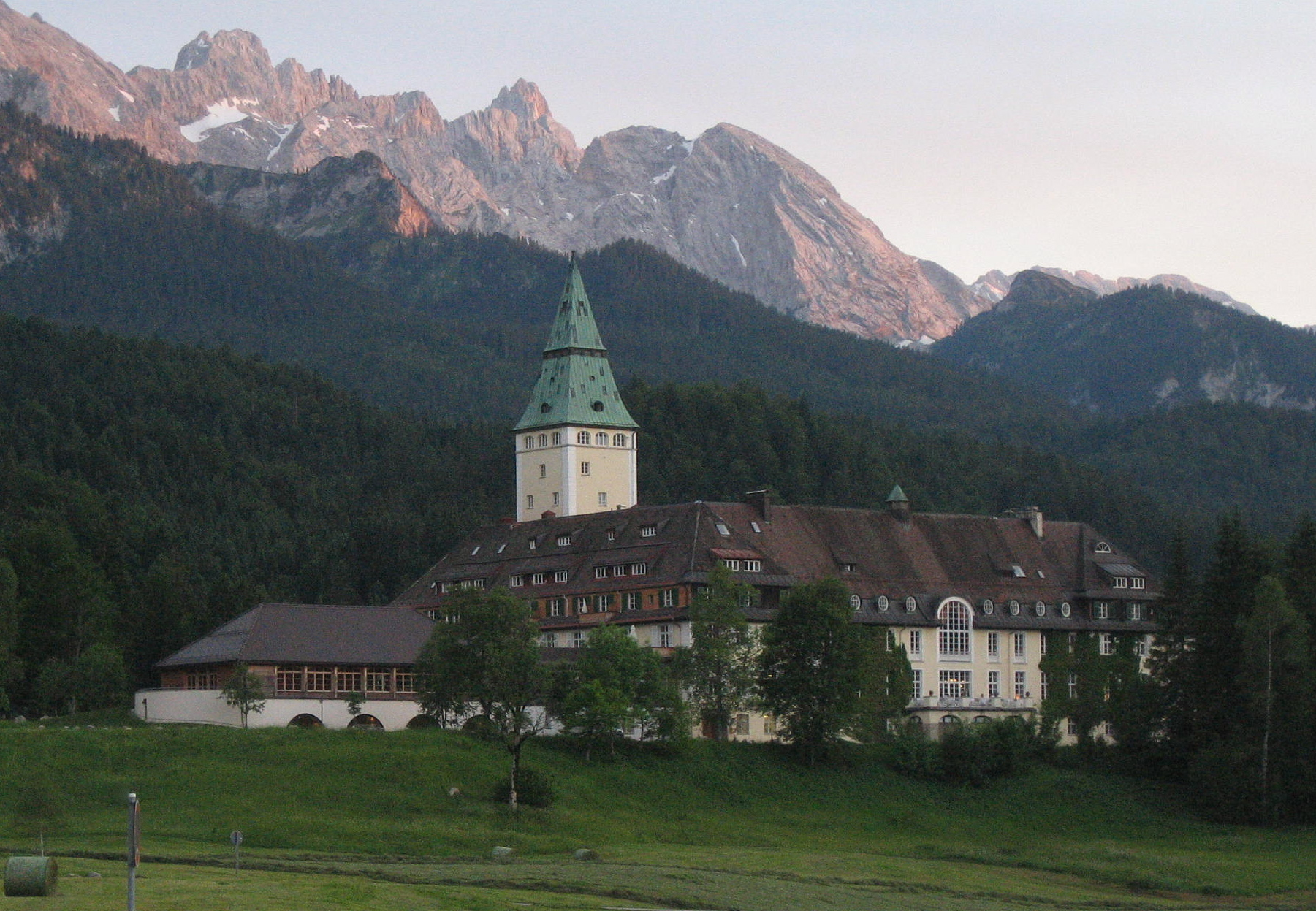
Schloss Elmau 2005

By a fortunate coincidence Johannes Müller had a brother-in-law called Carl Sattler who worked in Munich as an architect. The two men worked together to design and develop an elaborate sanatorium-like retreat in the fashionable Reform Architecture style at the Elmau site. Completed in 1916, financed by Elsa, Countess of Waldersee, this became Schloss Elmau. Max von Baden, a well-connected aristocrat-politician who on at least one occasion described Johannes Müller as his spiritual guide, and who later (briefly) became Chancellor of the German Empire, presided over the opening ceremony. At Elmau, Müller created a "Sanctuary of Personal Life" ("Freistätte persönlichen Lebens") where he hoped to be able to help lead "people of today" ("„Menschen von heute") along a path the nature of which corresponded to the meaning of Jesus' ethics. Teaching and daily life at Elmau involved a "believers' community", German folk dance, healthy food, chamber music concerts and the transcending of class and class boundaries. The extensive provision of music, in particular, had a powerfully curative effect on guests who came in search not necessarily of theological enlightenment, but hoping to find, from the music and the strikingly beautiful natural surroundings, a measure of relief from the intolerable stresses presented by daily life.

Unimaginably destructive war had broken out in July in 1914. Müller talked up the war as "Crisis of Healing" ("Heilkrise") which would confront humanity with the bankruptcy of its civilisation and awaken it from vacuousness ("aus ihrer Wesenlosigheit"). That the Germans stood alone against the whole world, with a superior shared spirituality and in a just cause, demonstrated in his own eyes that Müller was God's preferred device, to lead in the new age, and to resolve the matter of the pacifists through national victory. Müller himself became something of a semi-permanent fixture at Schloss Elmau (which, especially in wartime, was physically cut off from roads and population centres) in a way he never had at Schloss Mainberg. Young women were employed without payment to work as domestic assistants: some found themselves husbands from among the guests.

One of Johannes Müller's closest friends was the heir to the Grand Duchy of Baden (and at this time a close friend of Cosima Wagner) Max von Baden, who hoped that Müller might cure his anxiety attacks and help him overcome his perceived emotional isolation. Another intimate was the monarchist-theologian Adolf von Harnack. Schloss Elmau guests also included Maurus Gerner-Beuerle, later a longstanding "Domprediger" at Bremen, Eivind Berggrav who subsequently became the Bishop of Oslo and the writer Erich Ebermayer. It was at the recommendation of Adolf von Harnack that in 1917 the Theology Faculty at Berlin University conferred an honorary doctorate on Johannes Müller.

War ended in military defeat in 1918 to be followed in rapid succession by the abdication of Wilhelm II, a rash of revolutionary uprisings across the country, the establishment of a new republican government structure, currency collapse and years of economic hardship. Travel was no longer so difficult and Johannes Müller embarked on a succession of lecture tours, including in his itineraries Norway, Sweden, Hungary, the Netherlands and Denmark. He resigned from the Pan-German League in 1919.

=== Nazi years ===
The Nazi Party took power in January 1933 and lost no time in transforming Germany into a one-party dictatorship. Sources differ in their attempts to evaluate and summarise Johannes Müller's attitude to the Nazi régime. Müller said and wrote a lot: quotations from him can be adduced in support of more than one set of conclusions. Until the early 1930s he was able simply to ignore the Nazis. But at the time of the régime change he was impressed by Adolf Hitler. "I oppose fascism as a permanent part of the national constitution," he wrote, "but not if the hand of destiny sends the nation the gift of a leader" (""Ich bin gegen den Faschismus als ständige Verfassung, aber nicht als Schicksal und Gnade der Vorsehung, wenn sie der Nation einen Führer schenkt""). He was able to see the Nazi power seizure as a triumph for "common interest over individual interests" ("... des Gemeinnutzes über den Eigennutz"). On the other hand, he unequivocally condemned the state-sponsored persecution of Jewish citizens as a "disgrace to Germany" ("... Schande für Deutschland"), that made him "blush in shame" ("Schamesröte ins Gesicht treibe").

The respected commentator Ricarda Huch wrote in outrage that after initially distancing himself from Hitler, Müller had not merely reversed his position but "given vent to a full throated Hosanna" ("brülle aus voller Kehle Hosianna"). In a particularly enthusiastic outburst, referencing modern communications technology, he described Hitler as "the receptor of God's government and transmitter of the eternal rays" ("das Empfangsorgan für die Regierung Gottes und Sender der ewigen Strahlen"). In his 1934 work "Das Deutsche Wunder und die Kirche", Müller justified the violent church policies of the Nazis and their (in most respects supportive) German Christian ("Deutsche Christen") movement allies. He expressly backed church adoption and implementation of an Aryan paragraph. Although he was not directly involved in church politics, Müller was widely seen as "a kind of church teacher from the German Christian circle" (Georg Merz). In the Autumn/Fall of 1933 he undertook an official visit to Scandinavia in order to promote the Nazi state. The trip was organised by the "Staff of the state bishops", the Propaganda Ministry and the Foreign Office.

Müller's outspoken rejection of Nazi antisemitism led to him being branded a "friend of Jews" ("Judenfreund"), and he became the target of a press smear campaign. According to one source he avoided arrest at this time only because the Bavarian Chancelry convinced the Propaganda Minister Joseph Goebbels that Müller's principled backing of German Jewry added a moral dimension, otherwise hard to discern among Nazi backers, which could be of benefit in terms of government image-building. From 1934/35 Müller nevertheless became a target of Gestapo surveillance and was subjected to a succession of interrogations. That Scandinavia trip he had undertaken on behalf of the authorities in the Autumn/Fall of 1933 would be his last trip of this nature. It is also striking that Schloss Elmau never became a holiday destination of choice for the Nazi elite, partly because it could not be construed as antisemitic in character and partly because Müller had banned use of the so-called Hitler greeting.

In 1942, three years after the outbreak of another war, Johannes Müller agreed to rent out Schloss Elmau to the army for use as a convalescence establishment for soldiers returning from the front line. This avoided the threat that the estate might be requisitioned for personal use by Göring or Himmler. A year later a demand came through from the commander at the Sachsenhausen concentration camp that Johannes Müller should be arrested "for seriously degrading [the national war effort] while pretending to be a respectable citizen" ("wegen schwerer Zersetzungsarbeit unter dem Deckmantel des Biedermannes"). It turned out that Müller had been named by a prisoner under interrogation. However, Johannes Müller was not arrested presumably because his reputation remained sufficiently intact, and probably supported by an intervention from the Interior Minister, Wilhelm Frick (who had himself never even visited Schloss Elmau).

=== After the war ===
War ended in May 1945 with the western two thirds of Germany divided into four military occupation zones. Bavaria was occupied by the United States Army. In 1946 Johannes Müller faced a form of trial before Philipp Auerbach, the Bavarian Commissioner on race-based, religious and political persecution. Because of his "Eulogising of Hitler in speech and writing" ("Verherrlichung von Hitler in Wort und Schrift") Müller, now over 80, was "convicted" as a serious war criminal (als "Hauptschuldiger"). The verdict was contentious because Müller had never been a member of the Nazi Party member and had not been militarily involved which appeared to mean that there was no legal basis for conviction. A related application that Schloss Elmau should be confiscated failed, initially because Elsa Countess of Waldersee, who was still a part owner of it, refused to sell her share. Müller declined to defend himself before the commissioner, but the permanent expropriation of Schloss Elmau was not carried through. Müller did openly accept that he had been in error in his assessment of Hitler and he distanced himself from National Socialism, but in other respects he stood by his "teaching".

Having avoided confiscation during the Nazi period, Schloss Elmau was physically seized in 1945 by the US army. In 1947 it was transferred to a commissioner of the Bavarian government and, at the suggestion of Dr.Henri Heitan, used as a sanatorium/convalescence home for displaced persons and other Holocaust survivors till 1951. Meanwhile, Johannes Müller died there on 4 January 1949. After 1951 his heirs recovered possession of the estate. Sources are inconsistent as to whether they successfully sued the Bavarian government in 1951 to recover ownership of the family property, or whether they merely possess it as lease-holders. In any event, Schloss Elmau continues to be managed by Müller's descendants as a "Luxury Spa & Cultural Hideaway Hotel".

== Personal ==
Johannes Müller was married three times.

- The first marriage took place in 1891. The marriage, to Sophie von Römer, was childless and brief, ending in divorce after Sophie met an hotelier whom she subsequently married.
- The second marriage took place at Schliersee in 1900. Müller's second wife, Marianne Fiedler, originally from Dresden was a successful artist and lithographer by the time she met Johannes Müller. The marriage produced one son and two daughters. However, Marianne died in February 1904, a week after the birth of her second daughter, "Manne".
- The third marriage, in 1905, also took place at Schliersee, and was to another artist. Irene Sattler, originally from Würzburg, was a sculptor, though family related work took precedence after she married Johannes Müller. Despite being much younger, she was a close personal friend of Marianne Müller's and already knew the older children well when her friend died. The marriage took place despite the opposition of Irene Sattler's father, the artist Ernst Sattler, who viewed Johannes Müller's teaching as "deficient Philosophy" (als "dünne Philosophie"). Johannes Müller's third marriage resulted in eight more recorded children - four boys and four girls. Their first child together, Eberhard Müller-Elmau, achieved distinction as a stage actor and producer.
