= Christoph Sattler =

German architect

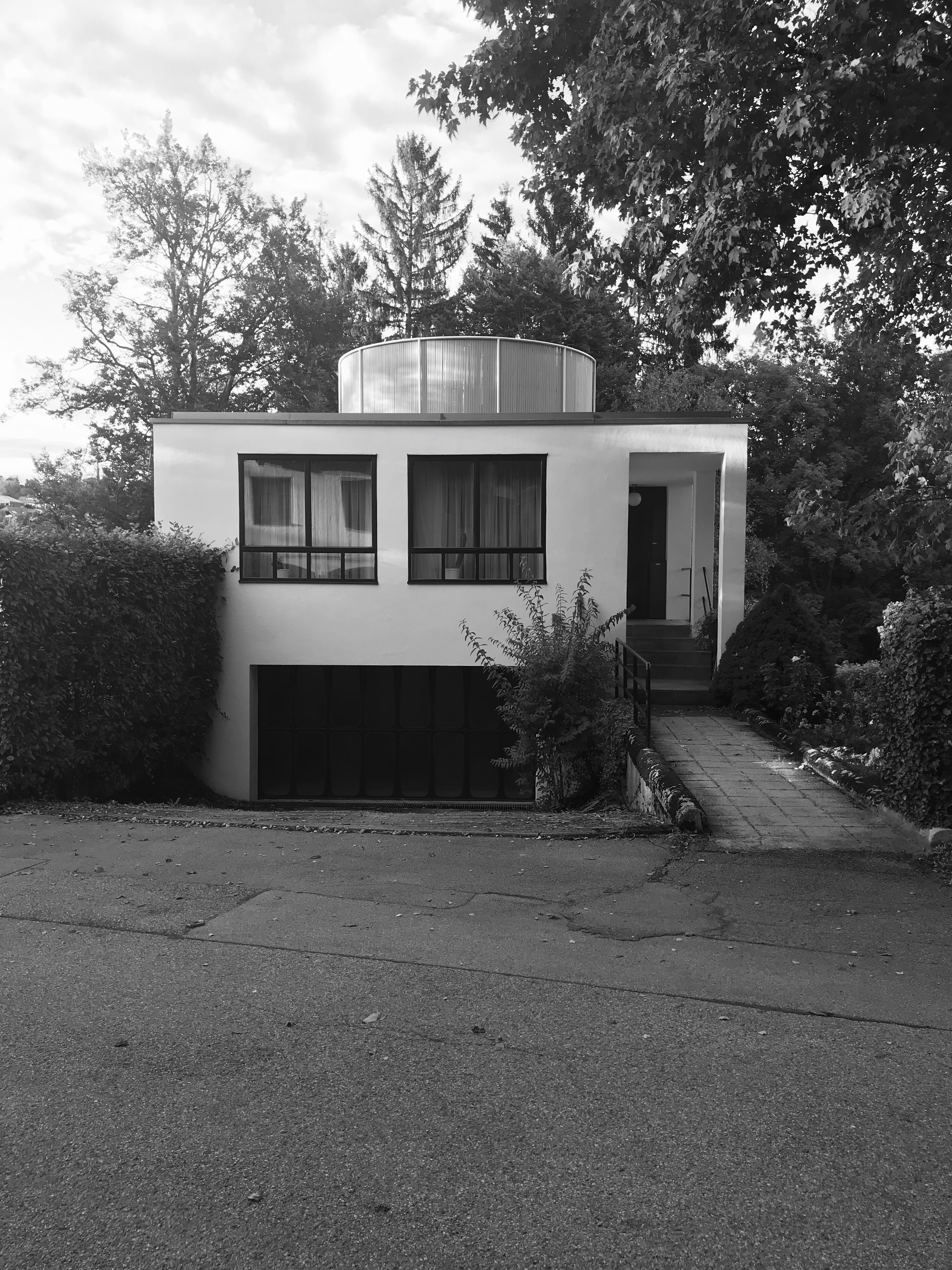
Wohnhaus Jürgen Habermas Christoph Sattler, 1971/72

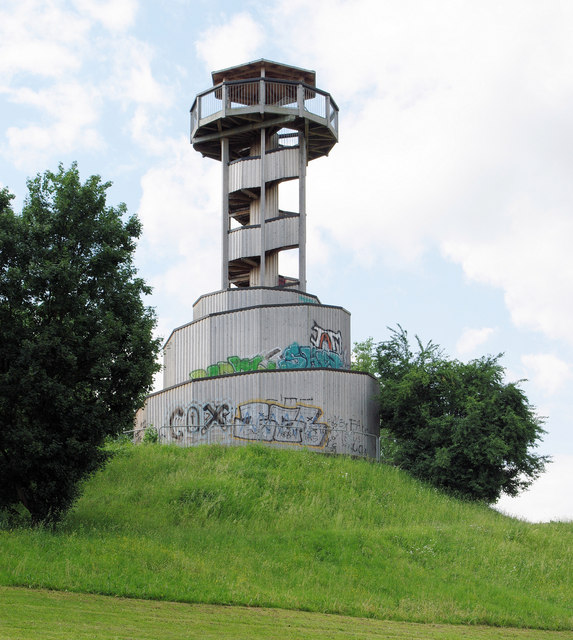
Seeparkturm Christoph Sattler, 1986

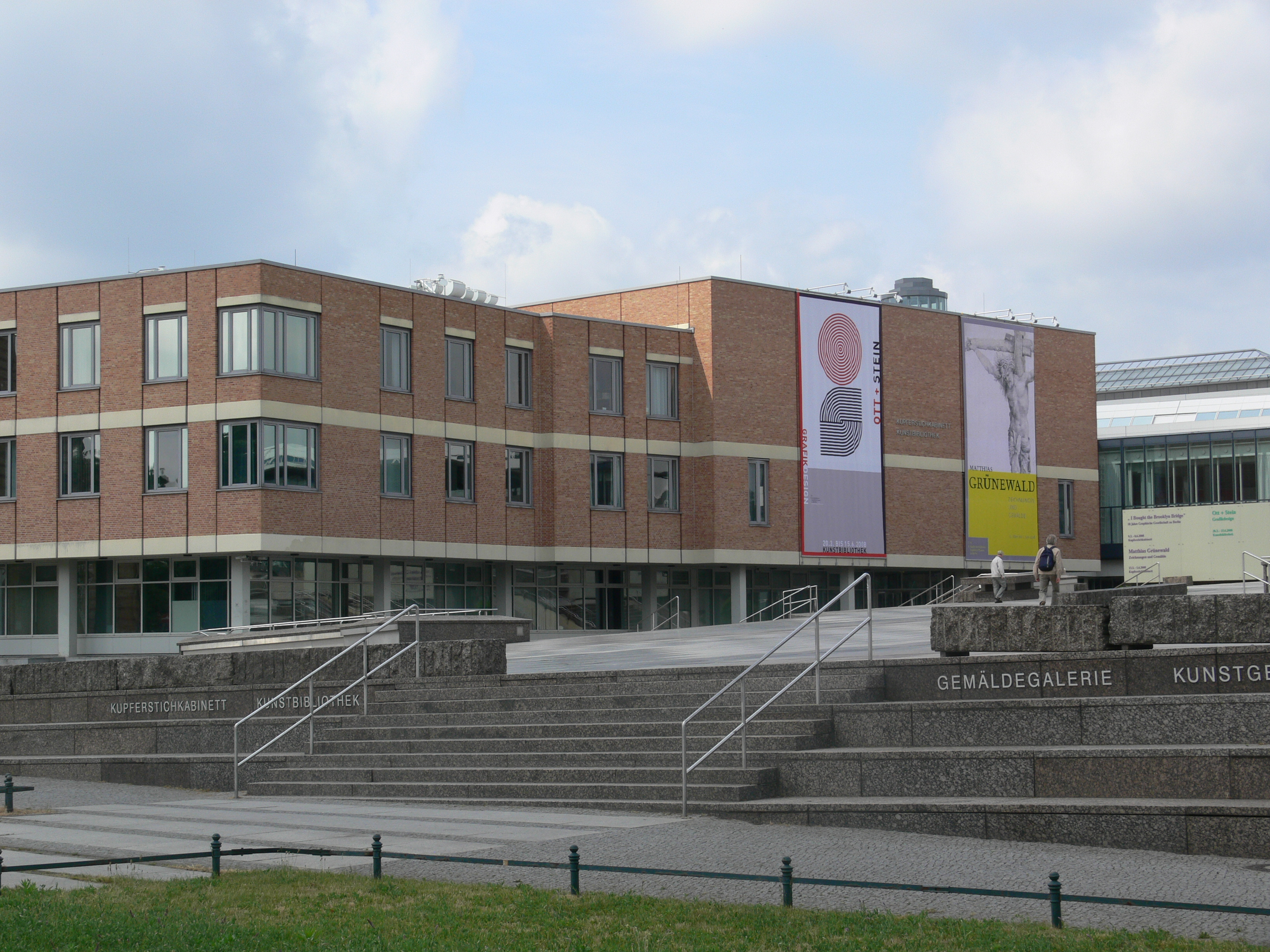
Berlin Kulturforum Kunstbibliothek und Kupferstichkabinett Christoph Sattler, 1994

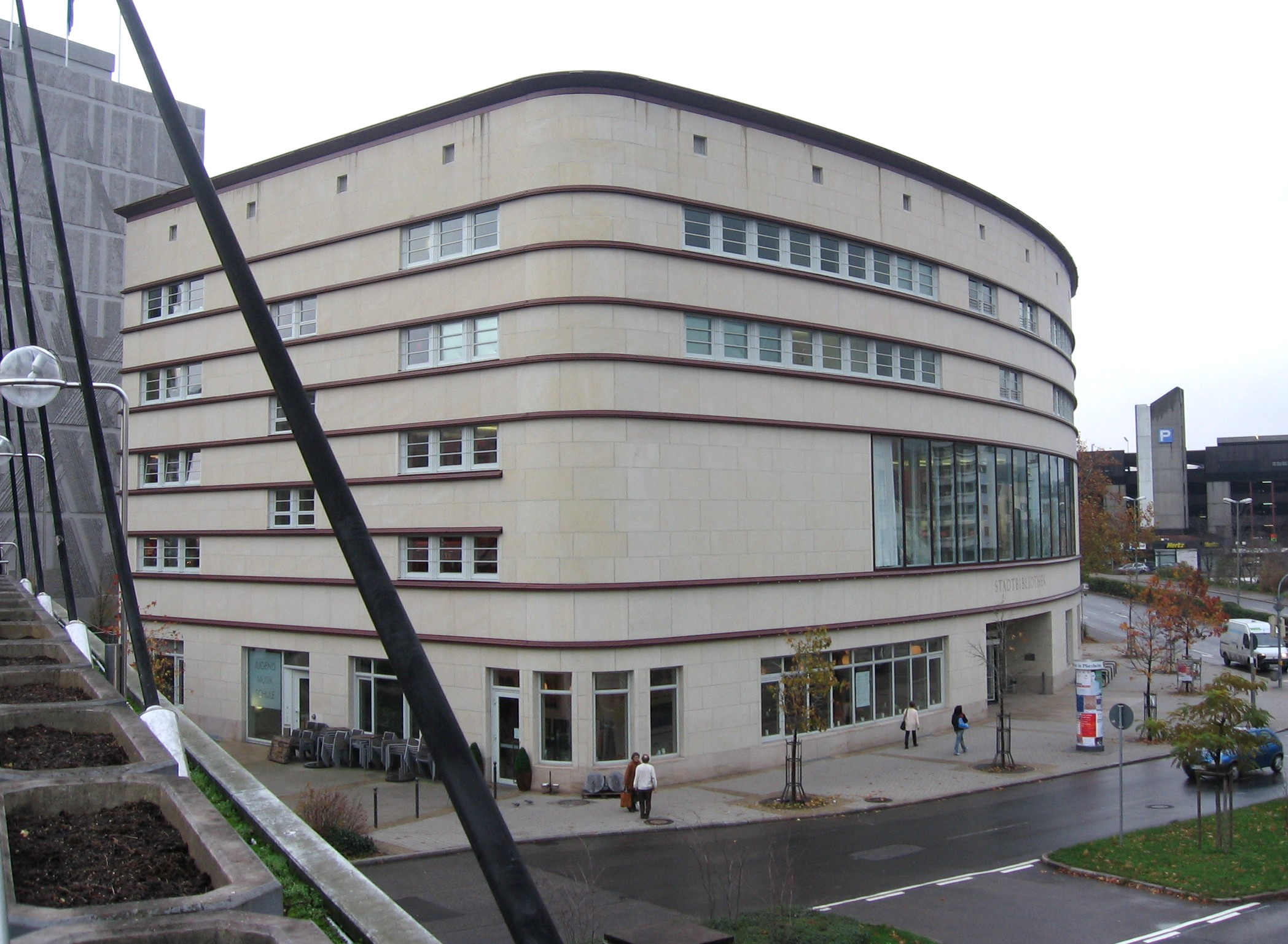
City library, Pforzheim Christoph Sattler, 1998

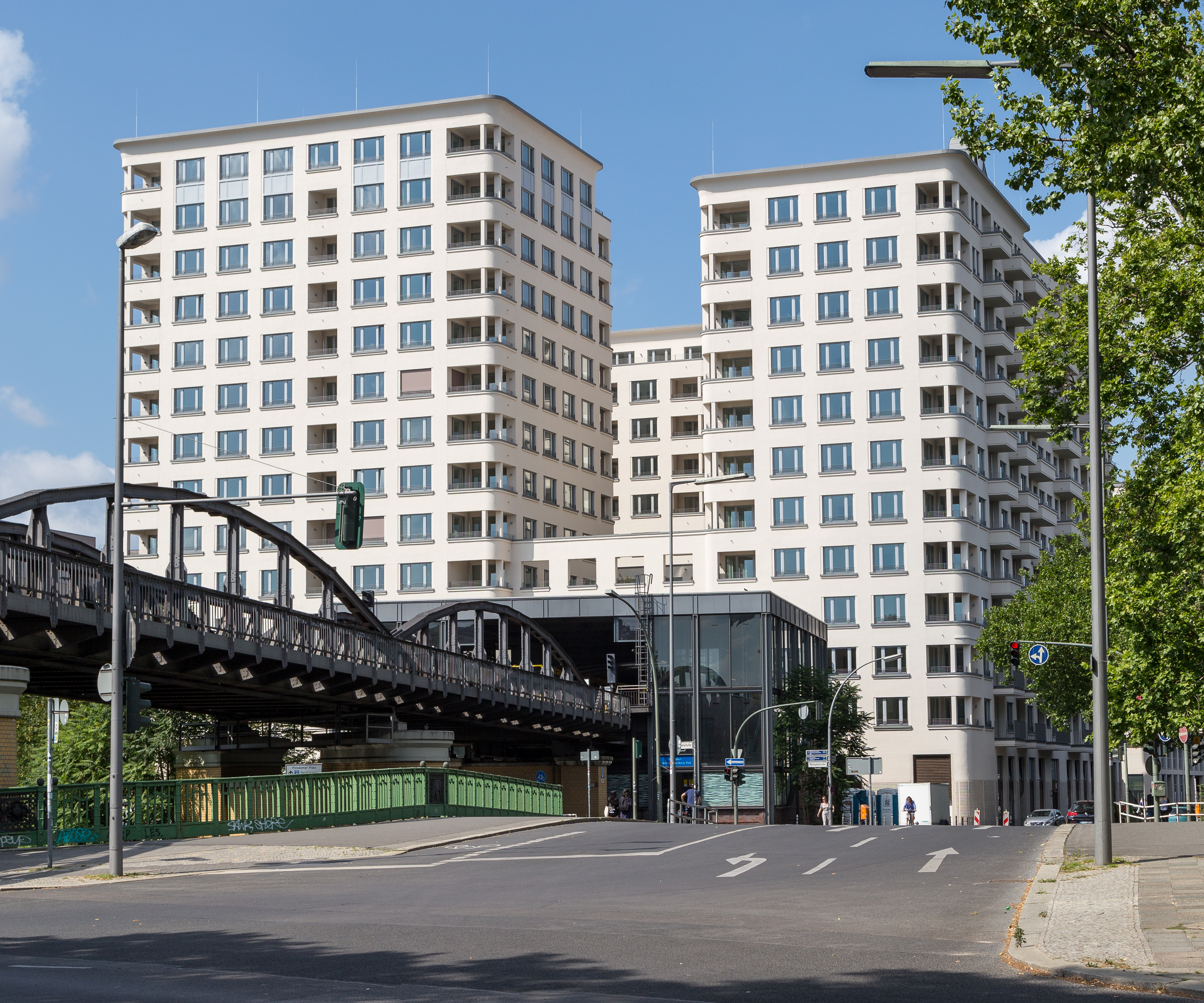
U-Bahnhof Mendelsohn-Bartholdy-Park Christoph Sattler, 1999-2002

Christoph Sattler is a prolific German architect who has been professionally active since the early 1970s. Most of his more prominent buildings are in southern Germany or Berlin. Although he is known for a number of large high-profile residential developments, he has also attracted widespread critical and public attention with public buildings and structures such as the Seeparkturm (tower in a park) in Freiburg, the Kupferstichkabinett ('museum of graphic art) in Berlin, various underground stations such as those of Am Hart (Munich) and Mendelssohn-Bartholdy-Park (Berlin) and several art galleries including the controversial Gemäldegalerie in Berlin. He studied for several years during the 1960s in North America as a post-graduate student. During that period he was employed with the firm of Ludwig Mies van der Rohe.

Christoph Sattler is the son of one German architect and the grandson of another.

== Life ==
Christoph Sattler was born in Munich which was administered as part of the US occupation zone after 1945. In cultural, social and political terms Bavaria (of which Munich is the capital) was heavily influenced by the United States during the so-called Wirtschaftswunder years through which he grew up. He was born into a prosperous family that had come through the twelve Nazi years unburdened by Nazi political connections, in the judgment of the military occupiers. Christoph Sattler was a Godchild of the high-profile priest-intellectual, Romano Guardini, and was indeed christened with "Romano" as his middle name, in celebration of that connection.

In 1952, he was enrolled at the German school in Rome. (His father, having switched careers, had recently accepted a senior diplomatic posting to the newly re-established West German embassy in the city.) In 1957, he enrolled at the Technical University of Munich: here he studied Architecture with a number of eminent teachers, including Johannes Ludwig, Josef Wiedemann and Franz Hart. He obtained practical experience with the architects Rudolf Schwarz (1960) and Peter C. von Seidlein.

Sattler moved to Chicago in 1963, where he studied at the Illinois Institute of Technology. Between 1963 and 1965, he was taught by Myron Goldsmith and Ludwig Hilberseimer, also working during 1964 for Ludwig Mies van der Rohe. Afrter receiving his Master of Science (M. Sc.) degree in 1965, he returned to West Germany. Between 1966 and 1973, he worked in the planning department of Neue Heimat (NH), a Hamburg-based non-profit housing and construction enterprise belonging to the German Trade Union Confederation.

In 1974, Christoph Sattler teamed up with Heinz Hilmer to establish the Munich-based firm Hilmer & Sattler (as the firm was initially known).

== Membership ==
Christoph Sattler is a member of the Association of German Architects

== Portfolio (selection) ==
- 1969 (ongoing): Rehabilitation of the medieval old city Karlsruhe
- 1971–1972: Habermas House (domestic home), Starnberg
- 1981: Wohnhaus Hans Herter House (domestic home), München
- 1979–1982: Residential development "documenta urbana" (conceptualising, planning and design), Kassel
- 1986: Seeparkturm (park tower), Freiburg im Breisgau
- 1988: Städtebaulicher Rahmenplan für Pforzheim
- 1990–1993: Studentenwohnheim Freiwasser, Eichstätt
- 1991: städtebauliche Gesamtplanung des Potsdamer und Leipziger Platzes
- 1993: U-Bahnhof Am Hart, Munich
- 1994: Kupferstichkabinett Berlin (Museum of Prints and Drawings)
- 1995–1997: Modernisation Schloss Elmau
- 1995–2006: Train station Potsdamer Platz
- 1998: U-Bahnhof Mendelssohn-Bartholdy-Park, Berlin
- 1998: Berliner Gemäldegalerie (picture gallery)
- 1998–2000: Martin Gropius Building renovation, Kreuzberg
- 1999–2002: City library and music school, Pforzheim
- 1999–2003: Zweiter Bauabschnitt der „Fünf Höfe“, München (Bauteil Salvatorstraße)
- 2000–2003: Hotel Ritz-Carlton (Potsdamer Platz), Berlin
- 2001–2003 & 2005: New Globe House for the Globe of Gottorf at Gottorf Castle Park
- 2005–2007: The Charles Hotel, Munich
- 2009: Congress center Hotel Einstein, St. Gallen
- 2009: Beisheim Center, Berlin
- completed 2010: Masterplan for Museumsinsel, Berlin, jointly with Oswald Mathias Ungers and David Chipperfield
- completed 2012: Restoration Altes Museum, Berlin
- since 2009: "Airtown" urban development plan for Berlin Brandenburg Airport
- 2008–2014: Nordbebauung der North Development of the Headquarters of the Federal Intelligence Site, Berlin (jointly with Henn GmbH (architects)
- 2017: Wiederaufbau Museum Barberini, Potsdam
- 2017–2018: MO82, Munich

== Prizes (selection) ==
- 1977: Association of German Architects' (Bavaria) prize for the Habermas House, Starnberg
- 1981: Association of German Architects (Bavaria) prize for the Wohnhaus Hans Herter House, Munich
- 2003: Architecture Prize of the Bavarian capital, Munich
