= Reichsfilmarchiv =

State film archive of the Third Reich

Coordinates: 51°N 9°E

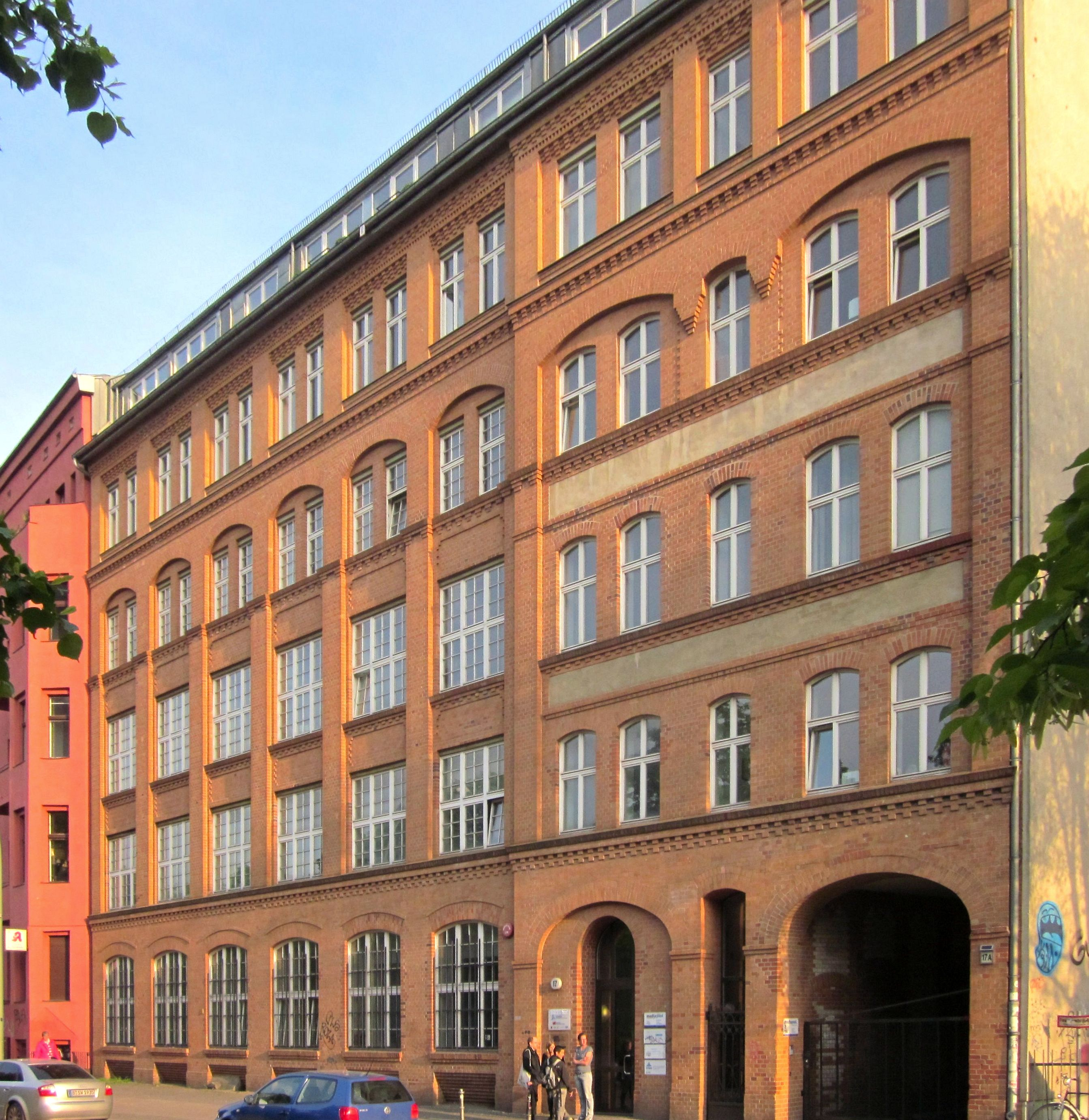
The Reichsfilmarchiv headquarters was located in this building on Tempelhofer Ufer, Kreuzberg, from 1939 to 1945.

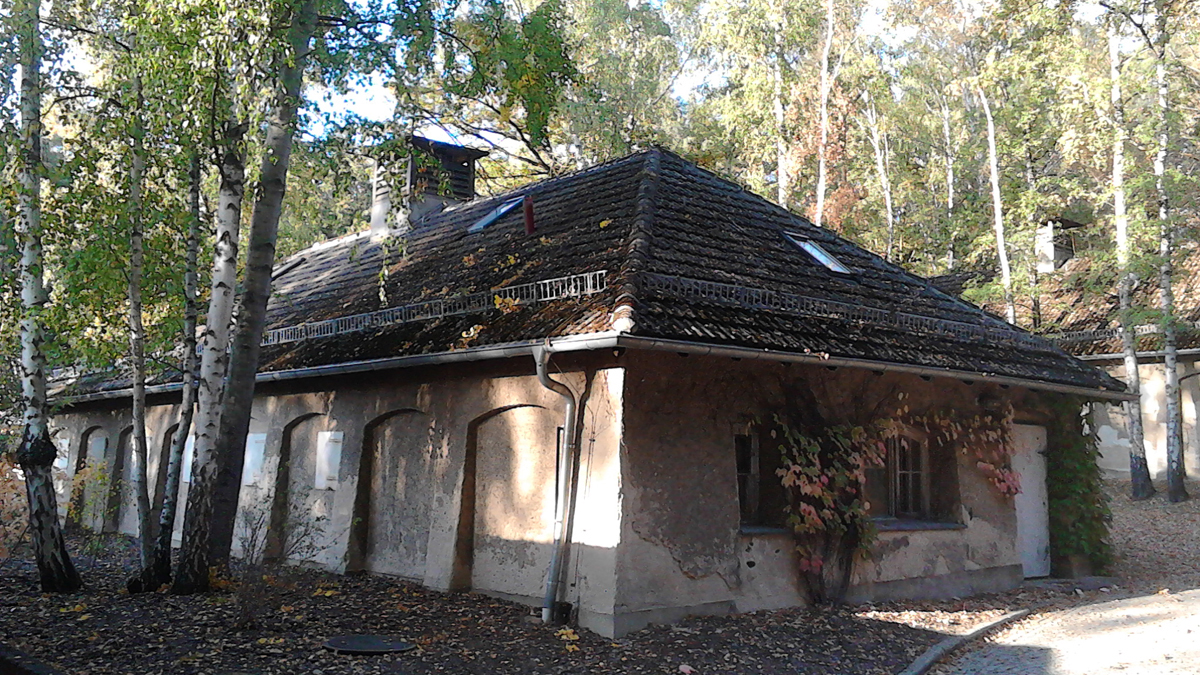
Bunker in Babelsberg Studio, Potsdam, used by the Reichsfilmarchiv to protect film reels from Allied bombing.

The Reichsfilmarchiv ("Reich Film Archive") was the state film archive of the Germany of the Third Reich. It was first German national film archive. It was opened in 1935, and based in Berlin. It ceased to exist in 1945, when its film stock was either destroyed or seized by the Soviet army.

== History ==
The Reichsfilmarchiv was opened on 4 February 1935 in Harnack House, Dahlem, Berlin, in the presence of Adolf Hitler and Joseph Goebbels, with an enormous flurry of propaganda. It soon gained a high international reputation. When the Fédération Internationale des Archives du Film (FIAF) was established as an international joint film archive in Paris in 1938, the Reichsfilmarchiv was one of the four founding members. The Independent State of Croatia kept copies of its films at the archive, due to the lack of a sufficient archive of its own.

After their arrival in Berlin in April 1945, Soviet troops seized the Reichsfilmarchiv and took possession of all its surviving film material. In 1947 its place was filled in West Germany by the Archiv für Filmwissenschaft ("Archive of Film Science"), set up in Marburg by Hanns Wilhelm Lavies, while in East Germany it was succeeded by the Staatliches Filmarchiv der DDR ("State Film Archive of the DDR"), established in 1955.

== Collections ==
At the time of its opening the film archive already held more than 1,200 films, some transferred from their previous place of deposit in the Reichsarchiv Potsdam ("Imperial Archives, Potsdam"), others provided by the film industry. By the end of World War II in 1945, not only through the normal channels of acquisition, but also in large part through seizure and confiscation in territories occupied by Nazi Germany during WWII, the collection had grown to 17,352 films.

After the end of the war most of these films, many of which had been stored in the bell tower of the Berlin Olympic Stadium, were lost. 6,400 selected films eventually found their way into the Soviet film archive in Krasnogorsk near Moscow and from there into Soviet cinemas, where some of them were still showing up to 1956. When in 1955 the Staatliches Filmarchiv der DDR (State Film Archive of East Germany) was founded, it was permitted to take over a proportion of the collection.

== See also ==
- List of German films of 1933-1945
- Cinema of Germany
- Reichsfilmkammer
- Department of Film (Nazi Germany)
