= Dieter Sattler =

German architect

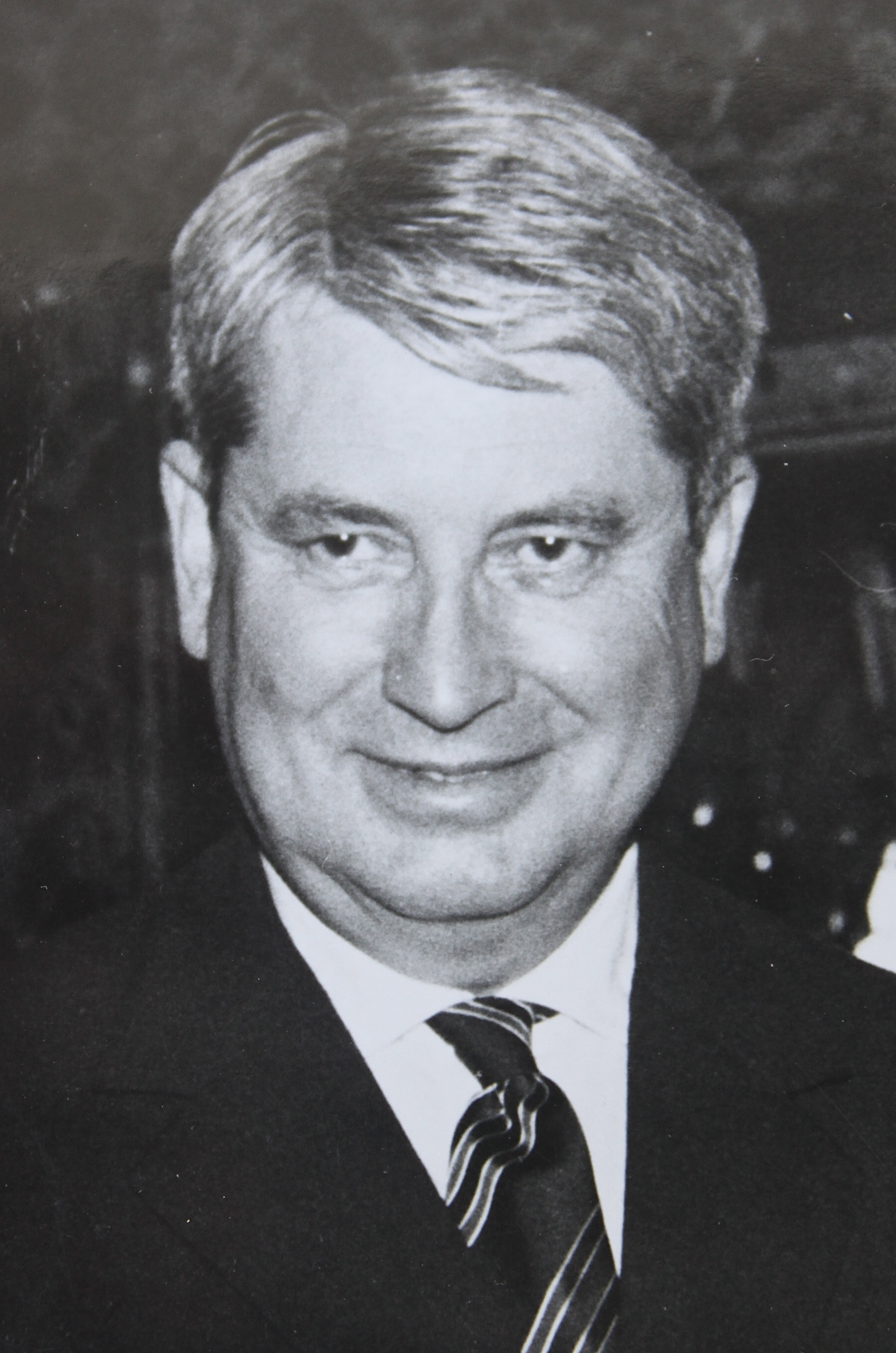
- Born: 2 February 1906; Munich, Bavaria, Germany
- Died: 9 November 1968 (aged 62); Rome, Italy
- Occupations: architect politician ambassador
- Political party: CSU
- Spouse: Maria Clara Schiedges (1910–1973)
- Children: 6
- Parent(s): Carl Sattler (1877-1966); Eva von Hildebrand (1877-1962)

Dietler Sattler (2 February 1906 – 9 November 1968) was a German architect who became involved in politics, especially with respect to culture, the arts and foreign policy. Between 1966 and 1968 he served as the West German ambassador to the Holy See.

== Life ==
=== Provenance and family connections ===
Dieter Sattler was born in Munich, the second of his parents' four children. His father was the architect Carl Sattler (1877-1966). His paternal grandfather, Ernst Sattler (1840-1923), was a painter. His mother was born Eva Hildebrand. His maternal grandfather was the sculptor Adolf von Hildebrand (1847-1921). There had been close links between the Sattler and Hildebrand families since at least 1848.

In 1933 Dieter Sattler married Maria Clara Schiedges (1910–1973). They met at a Theology seminar. She came originally from Düsseldorf. That marriage resulted in six recorded children. These included Birgit Albrecht who worked as a librarian, Monika Schätz, a book dealer, Christoph Sattler (born 1938), a Munich-based architect, Florian Sattler, a Communications Chief for the city of Munich, Martin Sattler, a Law Professor Emeritus at Heidelberg University and Stephan Sattler (born 1947), a prominent arts journalist.

Dieter Sattler was also father-in-law to the historian Dieter Albrecht (1927-1999).

=== Early years ===
Both Dieter Sattler's parents had been born in Florence where their own parents spent time as members of the expatriate artistic community. Dieter Sattler spent several months each year in Florence while a small child, but this routine came to an end in 1914, the year war broke out, and in 1915 he started to attend his secondary school in Munich. His parents separated in 1921. The children remained with their mother whose conversion to Roman Catholicism, (after growing up with parents who "had no Christian faith") had been a reason for the break-up. He passed his School Final Exams (Abitur) at the city's prestigious Wilhelmsgymnasium (secondary school) in 1924. Dieter Sattler himself would convert to Catholicism only in 1932, his decision to do so influenced both by the woman who shortly afterwards became his wife and by his intellectually formidable maternal uncle, Dietrich von Hildebrand (1889-1977), whose own conversion to Catholicism had taken place in 1914.

He attended the Technical University of Munich between 1924 and 1929, studying Architecture and later also Economics. He received his first degree in 1929 and a doctorate of engineering (Dr. Ing) in 1931. His dissertation topic was the sculptor (and his own grandfather) Adolf von Hildebrand. It was his intention to progress to a habilitation (higher academic degree) which would have opened the way to a lifelong university career, but after 1933 this option was blocked to him. One source states that he worked as a freelance architect in Munich and then in Berlin between 1929 and 1939, with a particular focus on residential development projects. Elsewhere it is stated that he began to work as an architect in Munich only in 1932. Either way, after receiving his doctorate in 1931 it seems that he found time for several lengthy visits abroad, becoming fluent (where he was not already) in English, French and Italian.

=== Nazi Germany ===
Dietrich von Hildebrand's influence extended beyond the narrow issue of a religious denomination. Sattler also came to share his uncle's hostility to the Nazi party which took power in January 1933 and spent the next few months transforming the country into a one-party dictatorship. Dieter Sattler's marriage to Maria Clara Schiedges took place on 19 May 1933 in Salzburg, at that stage still just across the border from Nazi Germany, in Austria. In 1932 Sattler had acquired a property at Grendach near Taching am See, close to Salzburg but on the German side of the frontier. The region was far off the beaten track, but his brother, the landscape painter Berhard Sattler, already lived in an adjacent hamlet. Bernhard had "discovered" the region which he valued for its visual and artistic beauty. Dieter Sattler caused a seemingly unprecedented surge in employment opportunities for the small holders in the village by having the former cowshed on his property converted into a family home. At this stage, however, after the marriage the Sattler couple (soon a young family) settled in Berlin where Sattler still hoped to continue with his studies and obtain a habilitation (higher degree). He was supervised for his studies by a professor who shortly after this had his teaching permit withdrawn because, according to the authorities, he was Jewish. After this Sattler found his will to join the nation's academic establishment had disappeared. Nevertheless, while pursuing his career as an architect he continued to take an active interest in other matters. For example, there were still lengthy trips abroad, and he organised at least one concert tour by the brilliant (and already world-famous) Russian pianist, Vladimir Horowitz.

During the twelve Nazi years Sattler made no secret of his dislike for the régime, retaining his belief in Catholic Conservatism and sustaining loose links with more active Christian opponents of Nazism. But he never himself participated in opposition activism (which would have been illegal), he was never identified as Jewish and he was clearly not a communist. Unlike his more outspoken uncle he never found it necessary permanently to escape from Germany. At the same time, sources hint that he received few architectural commissions at his Berlin office, and spent the later 1930s keeping out of the way at his Grendach property near Taching am See. In 1940 he was conscripted into the army: that summer he participated in the invasion of France.

After eight months in the army in France, in December 1940 he was taken off the frontline and switched to an "emergency" building project involving Linz. The Linz scheme was particularly dear to the leader's heart. Sattler was assigned to it for most of the rest of the war. A personal benefit was that he was far closer to Grendach where his wife and children were based permanently after 1943 when the family's Munich apartment was bombed out.

=== Reconstruction years ===
Military defeat left the western two thirds of Germany divided into four large military occupation zones after May 1945. Upper Bavaria was part of the US zone. The military administrators were on the look out for German professionals untainted by a Nazi past to make a start on rebuilding civil administration and society. Sattler was mandated to oversee the rebuilding/restoration the "party buildings" (as they had been designated during the Nazi period) in Munich's Königsplatz ("Royal square"). This turned out to be the first step in a political career for Sattler. He impressed the occupiers with his expertise and focus. He was also "noticed" by Hans Ehard, the man who became Bavarian Minister-president at the end of 1946, who commended the judicious objectivity of his judgement, able to be well-informed and quietly critical without becoming engaged in politics. Nevertheless, from now on Sattler did become involved with the emerging mainstream establishment, both politically and in terms of his architecture business which, inevitably, stood to benefit from the massive amount of reconstruction made necessary by the destruction of the war.

Sattler contributed in various ways to the reconstruction effort. He became a member of the City Housing Commission ("Wohnungsausschuß"). He was a co-instigator of the Provisional Arts and Culture Commission for the City of Munich" ("Vorläufigen Kunstausschuß der Stadt München"). He founded the Munich Professional Association for Architects and Construction Engineers ("Berufsverband für Architekten und Bauingenieure Münchens"), becoming its first president. He also, in 1946, joined the Christian Social Union in Bavaria, a political party of the conservative centre which sought to recapture the Catholic moral and political values of the pre-Nazi period for a more assertively (non-Prussian) Bavarian future. Sources stress, however, that he shunned the more partisan manifestations of the more high-profile CSU leaders of the time. As a member of the Regional Party Executive (Landesvorstand) between 1947 and 1951 he remained in the background.

Sattler's relatively low political profile was one of the qualities that commended him to Franz Josef Strauss, a leading member of the party's Müller wing. Strauss enthusiastically endorsed Sattler's appointment in 1947 as Bavarian secretary of state, which effectively meant working as deputy to another "Müller man", Alois Hundhammer, the Bavarian Culture Minister. The scope of the ministry also covered education. If Sattler belonged to any faction within the CSU, it was not the party's Müller wing, but he was in any case more interested in practical work. He had not campaigned for the appointment. Nevertheless, he did bring political balance and valuable abilities to his political role, representing the extreme south of Bavaria, with an approach deeply rooted in Catholicism and appreciation of the arts. At 41 he was considered relatively young. He was unencumbered by any skeletons from the Nazi years and, like the military administrators who, especially before May 1949, took a close and detailed interest in developments, Sattler had mastered English.

In this capacity Sattler served as a member of the Ehard government during 1946/47 and again in the successor administration which served till the end of 1950. Within the cabinet his responsibilities covered the "fine arts": he was appointed "Staatssekretär für Schöne Künste" on 31 January 1947. During his time as a member of the Bavarian government he was closely involved in the establishment, in 1948, of the Bavarian Fine Arts Academy ("Bayerische Akademie der Schönen Künste") and of the Bavarian Institute for Art History ("Zentralinstitut für Kunstgeschichte"). In 1948, Sattler also succeeded in having a teaching chair created at the Ludwig-Maximilians-Universität München for Romano Guardini, a noted Roman Catholic intellectual and, by this stage, also a family friend and frequent visitor at the Sattlers' home. The teaching chair at the Ludwig-Maximilians-Universität München effectively replaced the teaching chair at the Friedrich Wilhelm University of Berlin from which National Socialists had forced Guardini to resign back in 1939. Having planted the idea already in 1945, Sattler was from the beginnings in 1947 up to its final establishment in 1950, the main driving force behind the establishment of the Munich-based Institute for Contemporary History, the first German institute of its kind and still one of the most important academic institutions committed to research on Nazi Germany.

After the election at the end of 1950, Dieter Sattler and his minister, Alois Hundhammer were both replaced in the government. This may in part have been connected with the fact that Sattler had served as what amounted to an "under-minister" despite never actually having been elected a member of the Bavarian regional parliament ("Landtag"), or it may simply have reflected the shifting power balance within the party. Between 1950 and 1952 Sattler served as president of the German Theatre Association ("Deutscher Bühnenverein"). He also served during 1951/52 as chair of the broadcasting council at Bayerischer Rundfunk, the Bavarian broadcasting company. By this time, following the dramatic events in and above Berlin during 1948/49, Germany's American, British and French military occupation zones (but, conspicuously, not the Soviet occupation zone) had been combined in May 1949 and relaunched as the US-sponsored German Federal Republic (West Germany).

=== Diplomacy ===
Dieter Sattler found further uses for his experience of government service in July 1952, the month in which he was sent to Rome as a cultural attaché by the recently formed West German government. He remained in Rome till 1959. During his first few years much of his time was spent negotiating the return of the assets from the German Culture and Scientific Institute which had been confiscated by the Allied Armies during the war. One of his projects, which later became a model for German cultural institutions overseas, was the German Library in Rome. Meanwhile, in 1955 Bonn–Paris conventions, following several years of Anglo-French wrangling, were ratified and came into force in 1955, providing that West Germany should from that point acquire "the full authority of a sovereign State over its internal and external affairs". Most of the longer established members of the diplomatic community came with career histories that meant their contributions were no longer required by the West German diplomatic service. Sattler's own record seems not to have embarrassed anyone, however, his obdurate adherence to his Roman Catholic principals having effectively inoculated him against any involvement with the Nazi régime.

In 1959, he was recalled to Bonn, seat of the West German government, and appointed "Ministerialdirektor" and head of the Cultural Department at the Foreign Ministry. As the political tensions between East and West Germany spilled over into the cultural sphere, his seven years in the office coincided with a period of significant "soft power" investment. On Sattler's initiative the Goethe Institute gradually took over all of the German cultural institutes abroad that fell within the ambit of the West German government. Sattler's objective was to anchor activities of the culturally focused German overseas institutions more firmly within the country's overall foreign policy strategy, which in some ways reflected his own life and career, using diplomatic instincts and personal panache to bring together the worlds of the arts and of politics.

In October 1966, Dieter Sattler took up his appointment, which had been announced seven months earlier, as West German ambassador to the Holy See, a position for which his previous career made him, in the opinion of one commentator, the "ideal candidate". His term was cut short by his death at Rome in November 1968, caused by a nerve infection.

== Awards and honours ==
- 1961 Bavarian Order of Merit
- 1963 Grand Cross with star of the National Order of Merit (France)
- 1964 Grand Decoration of Honour for Services to the Republic of Austria in Gold with Star
- 1965 Order of Merit of the Italian Republic, Grand Officer
- 1965 Knight Commander of the Order of the British Empire (KBE)
- 1965 Ordre des Palmes Académiques, highest rank (Commandeur)
- 1965 Commander with star of the Order of St. Gregory the Great, awarded by Pope Paul VI
- 1968 Order of Pope Pius IX, Knight Grand Cross (GCPO) awarded by Pope Paul VI
- 1968 Order of Merit of the Federal Republic of Germany (Grand Cross)
