= Carl Sattler =

German architect and university lecturer (1877–1966)

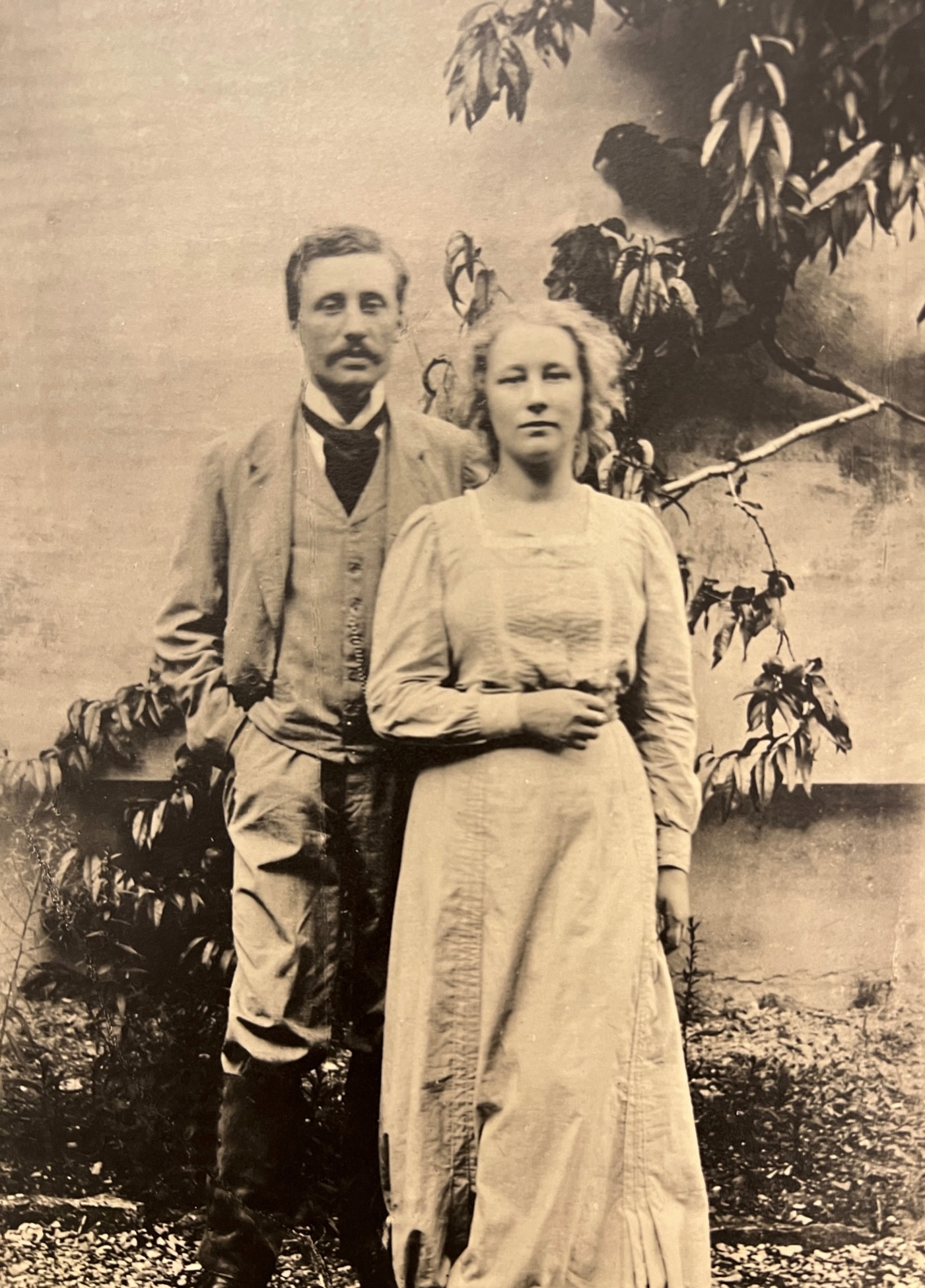
- Sattler with his sister Irene Sattler (1880–1957), a sculptor
- Born: Carlo Sattler; 6 November 1877; Florence, Kingdom of Italy
- Died: 13 January 1966 (aged 88); Munich, Bavaria, West Germany
- Education: Dresden Technological Academy
- Occupation: Architect
- Spouse(s): Eva von Hildebrand (1877–1962); Thea Weil (1900–1991)
- Children: Bernhard Sattler (1903–1980); Dieter Sattler (1906–1968) and others
- Parent(s): Johann Ernst Sattler (1840–1923); Elisabeth Leopoldine Mathilde Agnes Hurtzig (1851–1943)

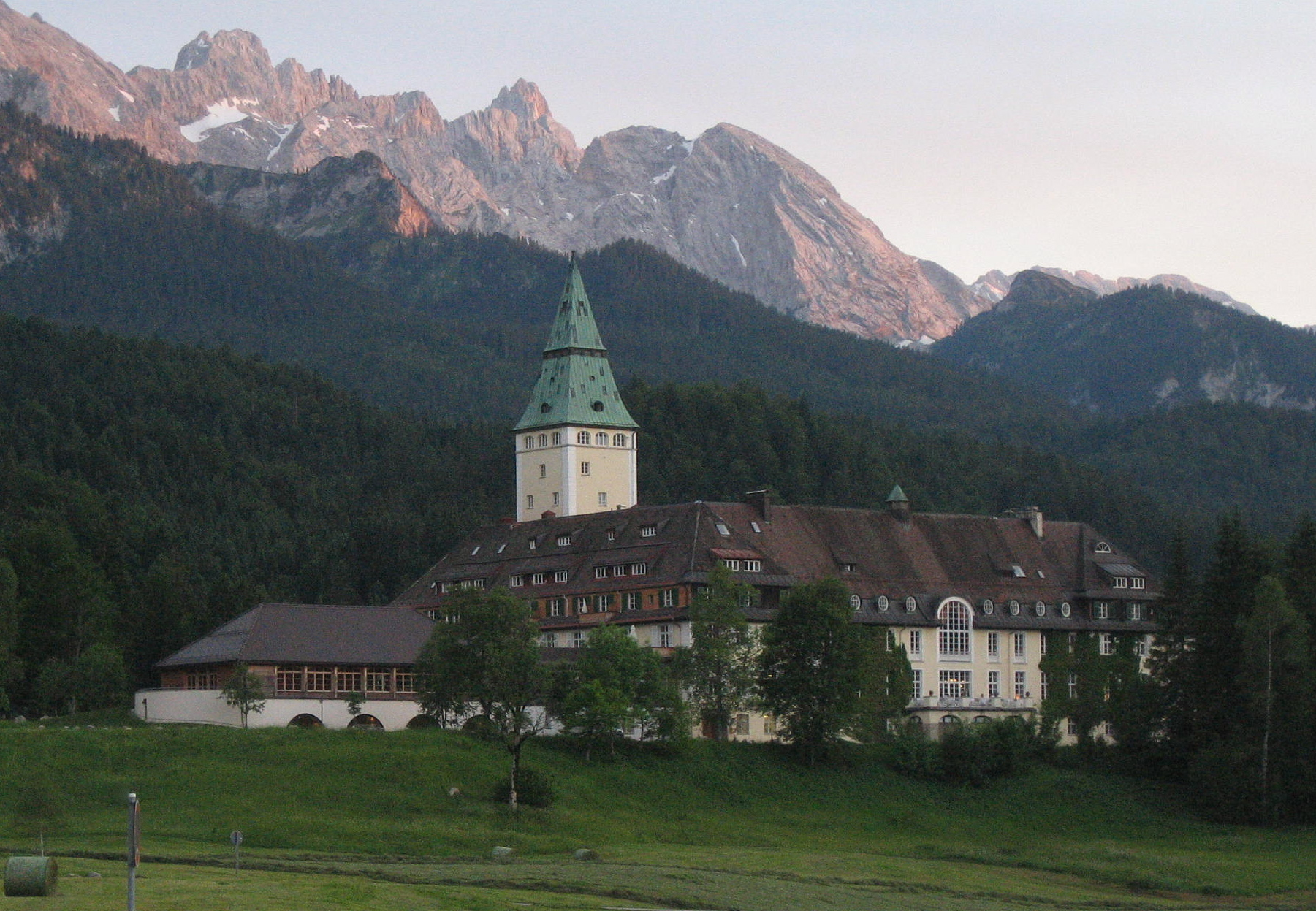
Schloss Elmau (1914–1916) at the foot of the Wetterstein range

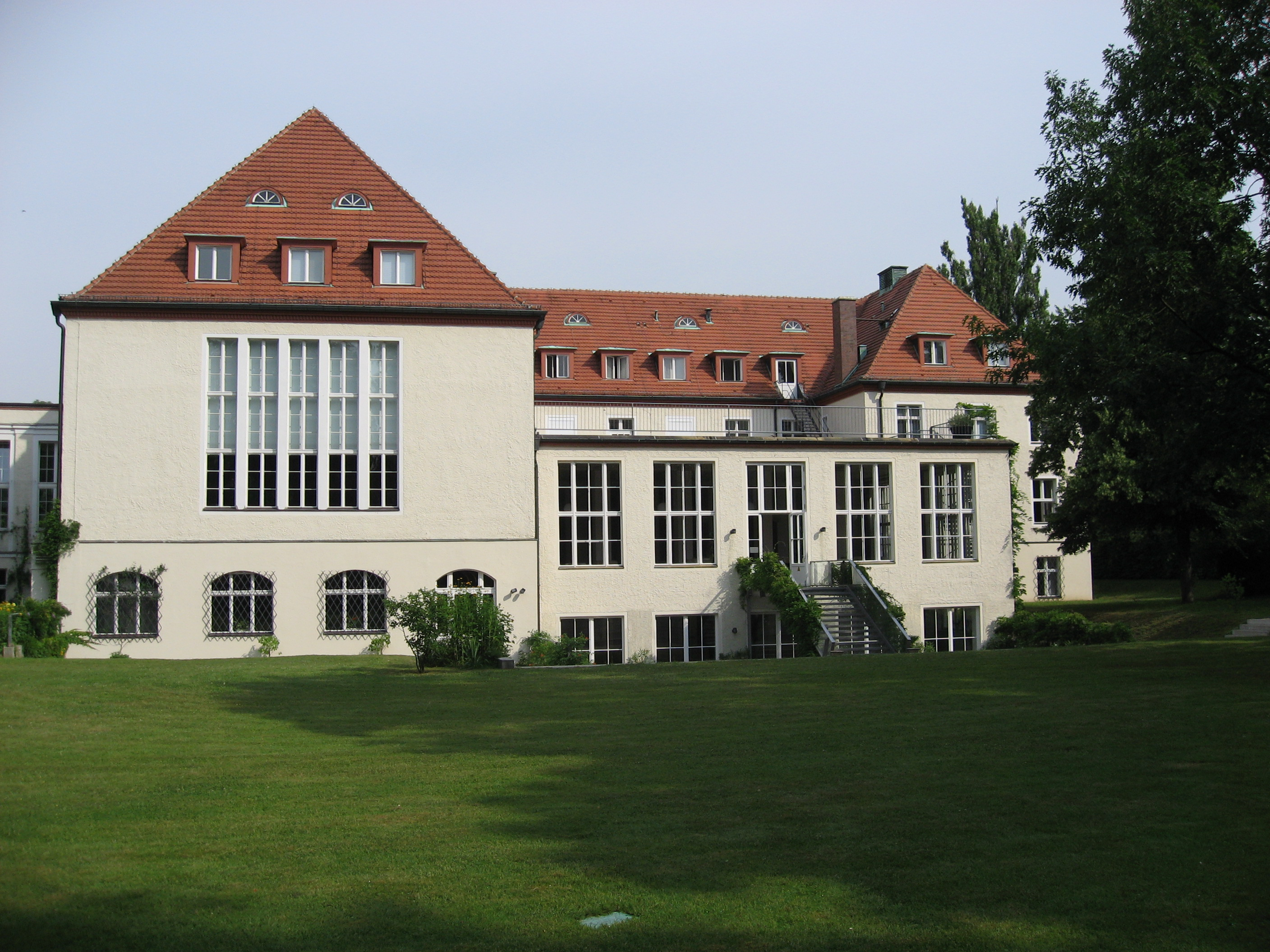
Harnack House (1928–1929) from the garden (i.e. the "rear" of the building)

Carl Sattler (6 November 1877 – 13 January 1966) was a German architect and university lecturer.

== Life ==
Carlo Sattler was born in Florence. His father, the painter Ernst Sattler, was originally from the Schweinfurt area, but had, like other artists, been drawn to Tuscany. While he was growing up Sattler came under the influence of another German expatriate, the sculptor Adolf Hildebrand (1847–1921).

Between 1896 and 1898 Sattler studied architecture at the Dresden Technological Academy where his teachers included Paul Wallot and Cornelius Gurlitt. In 1898, responding to a "not to be resisted" invitation from Hildebrand, he moved to Munich which is where he settled and remained for the rest of his life. 1898 marked the start of a long and fruitful professional collaboration with the sculptor. In 1902 he married Eva "Nini" Hildebrand which meant that Adolf Hildebrand became his father-in-law. For several years Hilderand and Sattler were based at the same premises, but in 1906 Carl Sattler opened his own Munich based architecture practice.

Military defeat in 1918 was followed by an outbreak of revolution across many parts of Germany. Under the short-lived Munich Soviet Sattler was a member of the Arts Council. Between 1925 and 1933 he served as director of the Royal Academy of Applied Arts ("Königliche Kunstgewerbeschule") in Munich, in succession to Richard Riemerschmid. He continued to work at the academy till 1939 when he was dismissed because of his "intermarriage to a Jewish woman".

In his late 60s by the time the war ended in 1945, Sattler nevertheless returned briefly to prominence, serving between 1946 and 1957 as the president of the Academy of Fine Arts in Munich.

In 1948 his son, the architect-diplomat Dieter Sattler played a leading role in establishing the Bavarian Fine Arts Academy. Carl Sattler was a founder member.

== Output (selection) ==
- 1906: Wittelsbacherbrunnen (Wittelsbach Fountain) in Eichstätt (jointly with Irene Hildebrand who had become Sattler's sister-in-law when he married Eva Hildebrand in 1902)
- 1906–1911: The Smith of Kochel-Memorial in Munich-Sendling (surround and support for bronze statue by Carl Ebbinghaus)
- 1908–1911: Garden extension (with summer house and swimming pool) at Villa Boveri in Baden im Aargau
- 1910–1912: Villa Loeb with summer house in Munich
- 1910–1911: principal accommodation block at the Hellerau Festival Theatre in Hellerau Garden city
- 1912: Schloss Hochried in Murnau am Staffelsee
- 1913: Conversion and extension of the Riedber House in Garmisch
- 1914–1916: Schloss Elmau Sanatorium and Wellness center (with Johannes Müller). Schloss Elmau was two thirds damaged by fire in 2005, but was returned to its original look from the outside while being rebuilt to modern standards under the skin. The architect responsible for the 2005-2007 rebuild, Christoph Sattler, is one of Carl Sattler's many grandchildren.
- 1914–1926: Dr. Weidner Sanatorium in Loschwitz (Dresden)
- 1926–1927: Kaiser Wilhelm Institute of Anthropology, Human Heredity, and Eugenics in Berlin-Dahlem
- 1927–1928: German Institute for Psychiatric Research (subsequently the Max Planck Institute) in Munichen, Kraepelinstraße
- 1928–1929: Harnack House in Berlin-Dahlem
- 1929: Neurology Clinic of the Kaiser Wilhelm Society in Berlin-Buch
- 1929–1930: Student residence, Erlangen
- 1938–1941 und 1949–1950: Bayerische Landeszentralbank in Munich
- 1945–1953: Reconstruction of the Palais Porcia (for the Bayerische Vereinsbank) in Munich

== Awards and honours ==
- Bavarian Order of Merit
- Order of Merit of the Federal Republic of Germany
