= Staatliches Filmarchiv der DDR =

The Staatliches Filmarchiv der DDR (SFA) ("State Film Archive of the GDR") was the central film archive of the GDR (East Germany).

The archive, founded on 1 October 1955, was commissioned to collect, secure and make publicly accessible the results of the national film production. The first director was Rudolf Bernstein, previously director of the film distribution company Progress Film.

The initial collection consisted of copies of films given to the East German government in 1954 by the Soviet Union, comprising the remains of the collections of the former Reichsfilmarchiv, the originals of which had been acquired by the Soviet army when it advanced into Berlin in 1945. Additionally the new film archive received copies of all films made in East Germany. For the better conservation and restoration of its film collections the archive possessed, among other facilities, a copying studio.

After the reunification of Germany the Staatliches Filmarchiv der DDR was incorporated on 3 October 1990 into the film collections of the Bundesarchiv ("German Federal Archives").

== See also ==
- List of film archives
