= Johann-Peter-Hebel-Plakette =

German literary award

Johann-Peter-Hebel-Plakette is a literary prize, awarded annually since 1960, by the community of Hausen im Wiesental in Baden-Württemberg, Germany. The prize is given in memory of Johann Peter Hebel, on the Saturday before 10 May each year.

== Winners ==
- 1960 Ernst Niefenthaler
- 1961 Karl Seith
- 1962 Ernst Grether
- 1963 Adolf Glattacker
- 1964 Dr. Otto Kleiber
- 1965 Hedwig Salm
- 1966 Karl Ringwald
- 1967 Paula Hollenweger
- 1968 Dr. Eduard Sieber
- 1969 Anton Dichtel
- 1970 Hubert Baum
- 1971 Maurus Gerner-Beuerle
- 1972 Fritz Schülin
- 1973 Gerhard Jung
- 1974 Gustav Oberholzer
- 1975 Julius Kilbiger
- 1976 Otto Reinacher
- 1977 Karl Kurrus
- 1978 Alban Spitz
- 1979 Married couple Albrecht-Vischer
- 1980 Dr. Fritz Fischer
- 1981 Werner Mennicke
- 1983 Hans Krattiger-Enzler
- 1984 Anne Franck-Neumann
- 1985 Ernst Hug
- 1986 Marcel Wunderlin
- 1987 Werner Richter
- 1988 Johannes Wenk-Madoery
- 1989 Jean Dentinger
- 1990 Ludwig Vögely
- 1991 Dr. Beat Trachsler
- 1992 Dr. Erhard Richter
- 1993 Paul Nunnenmacher
- 1994 Prof. Dr. Gustav Oberholzer
- 1995 Dr. Rudolf Suter-Christ
- 1996 Günter Braun
- 1997 Emma Guntz
- 1998 Karl Fritz
- 1999 Thomas Burth
- 2000 Gerhard Leser
- 2001 Luise Katharina Meier ("Breiti-Lieseli")
- 2002 Dr. Hans Viardot
- 2003 Ernst Burren
- 2004 Walter Arzet
- 2005 Liesa Trefer-Blum
- 2006 Paula Röttele
- 2007 Lieselotte Reber-Liebrich
- 2008 Werner Störk
- 2009 Dr. Martin Keller
- 2010 Karl Heinz Vogt
- 2011 Liliane Bertolini
- 2012 Ursula Hülse
- 2013 Manfred MarkusJung
- 2014 Klaus Schubring
- 2015 Jürgen Kammerer
- 2016 Uli Führe
- 2017 Beatrice Mall-Grob
- 2018 Hansjörg Noe
- 2019 Edgar Zeidler
- 2020 Thomas Schmidt
- 2021 Dominik Wunderlin
