= Harnack House =

Building in Berlin, Germany

Coordinates: 52°26′58″N 13°16′46″E

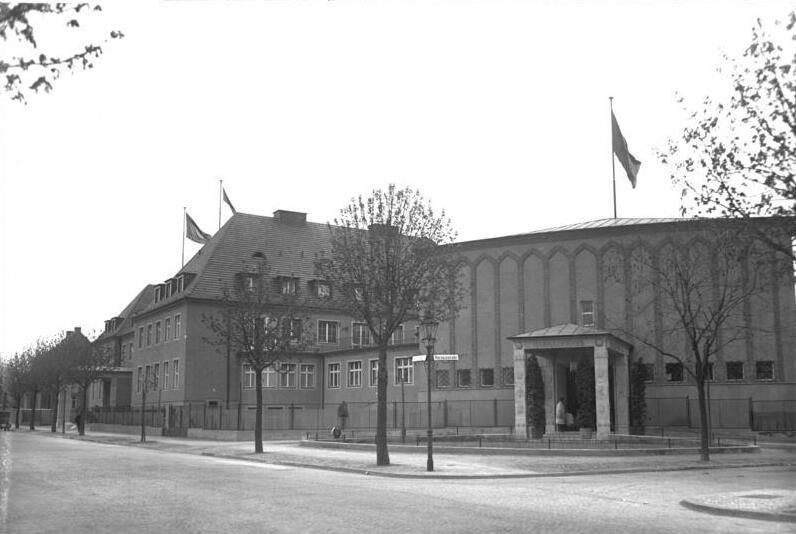
Front view of the Harnack House in 1929

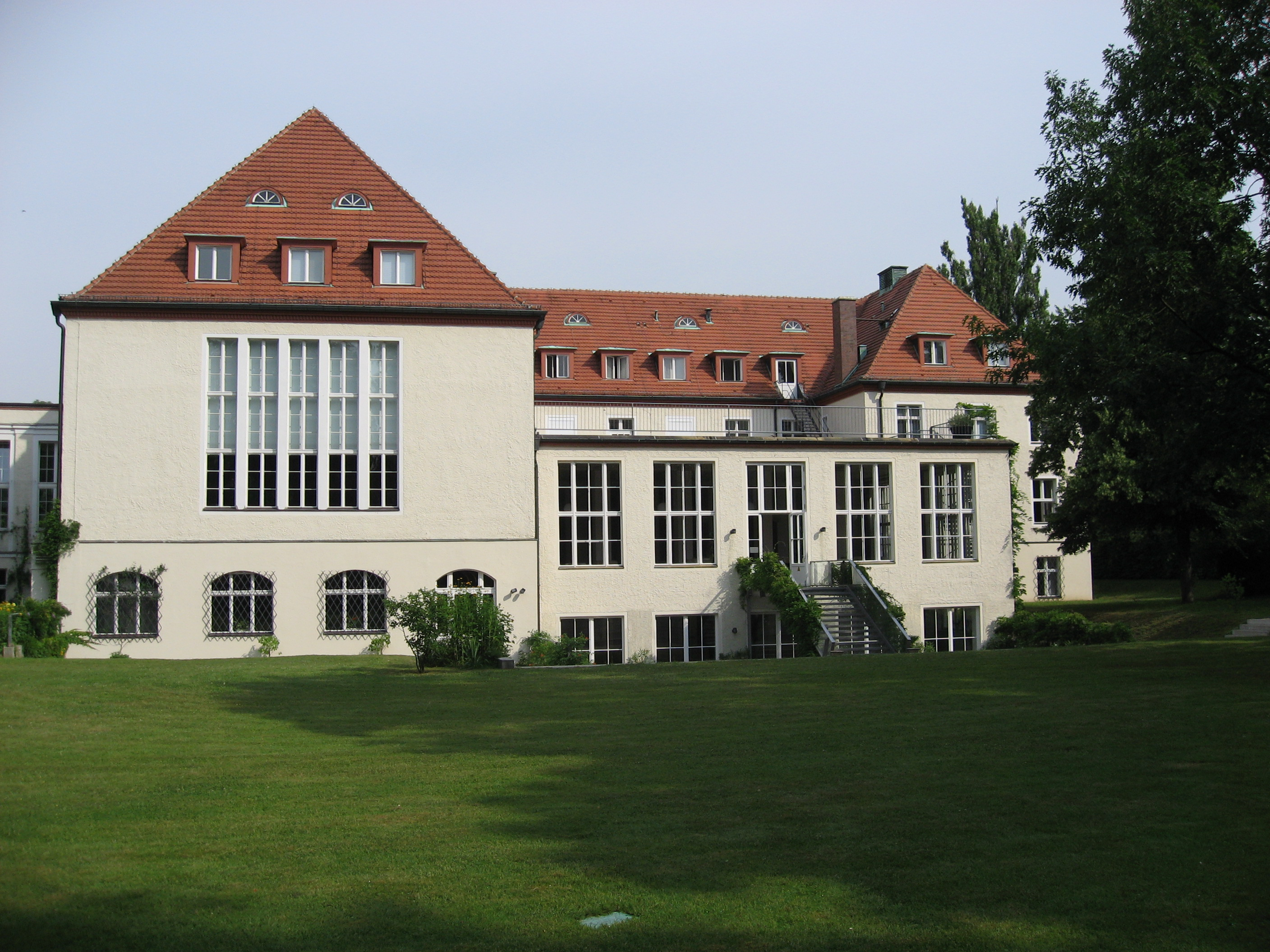
Rear view of the Harnack House, from its garden

The Harnack House (German: Harnack-Haus) in the Dahlem district of Berlin, Germany, was opened in 1929 as a centre for German scientific and intellectual life. Located in the intellectual colony of Dahlem, seat of the Free University Berlin, it was founded by the Kaiser Wilhelm Gesellschaft (KWG) on the initiative of its first president, the theologian Adolf von Harnack, and of its then chairman, Friedrich Glum. The project was supported politically by the Weimar Republic Chancellor Wilhelm Marx and Foreign Minister Gustav Stresemann, and an influential Centre Party deputy Georg Schreiber. The land for its construction was donated by the state of Prussia, and the costs of building and furnishing the house were defrayed partly by the government (which contributed 1.5 million marks), and partly by public subscription (which raised about 1.3 million marks).

The original purpose of the Harnack House was to provide a conference centre and visitor accommodation for major events designed to promote German science and overcome the isolation that German academics suffered after the First World War. Many notable German scientists resided or worked there, including Nobel Prize winners Fritz Haber, Otto Hahn and Albert Einstein. After the Nazis' seizure of power in 1933 the House fell under their influence, for example becoming the seat of the Reichsfilmarchiv. However prominent members of the KWG did not always comply with the Nazi agenda; for example in 1935 the Harnack House was the scene of a major commemoration of the life of Fritz Haber, led by Max Planck, despite the fact that Haber had been exiled by the Nazis because of his Jewish origins. In 1941 Planck in a public lecture at the House warned of the consequences for humanity of attempts to split the atom, despite the ongoing German nuclear energy project, sponsored by the German government, led by Werner Heisenberg and based at one of the KWG institutes.

The House was not significantly damaged in the fall of Berlin in 1945 at the end of the Second World War, and after a short period in Soviet hands it became an officers' mess for the occupying U.S. Army, though because of its historical prestige it was also used for cultural and diplomatic events. In 1994 it was returned to German control and reverted to its original use in the hands of the Max Planck Gesellschaft, the post-war successor organisation to the KWG. It now offers facilities for conferences, and also accommodation for visitors to the various Max Planck Institutes in Berlin; the architecture and furniture remain in the original style. To provide additional accommodation, the House operates a guest house on the opposite side of the Ihnestrasse from the main building.
