= Schloss Elmau =

Known as Germany's most luxurious five-star spa hotel

Coordinates: 47°27′43″N 11°11′10″E

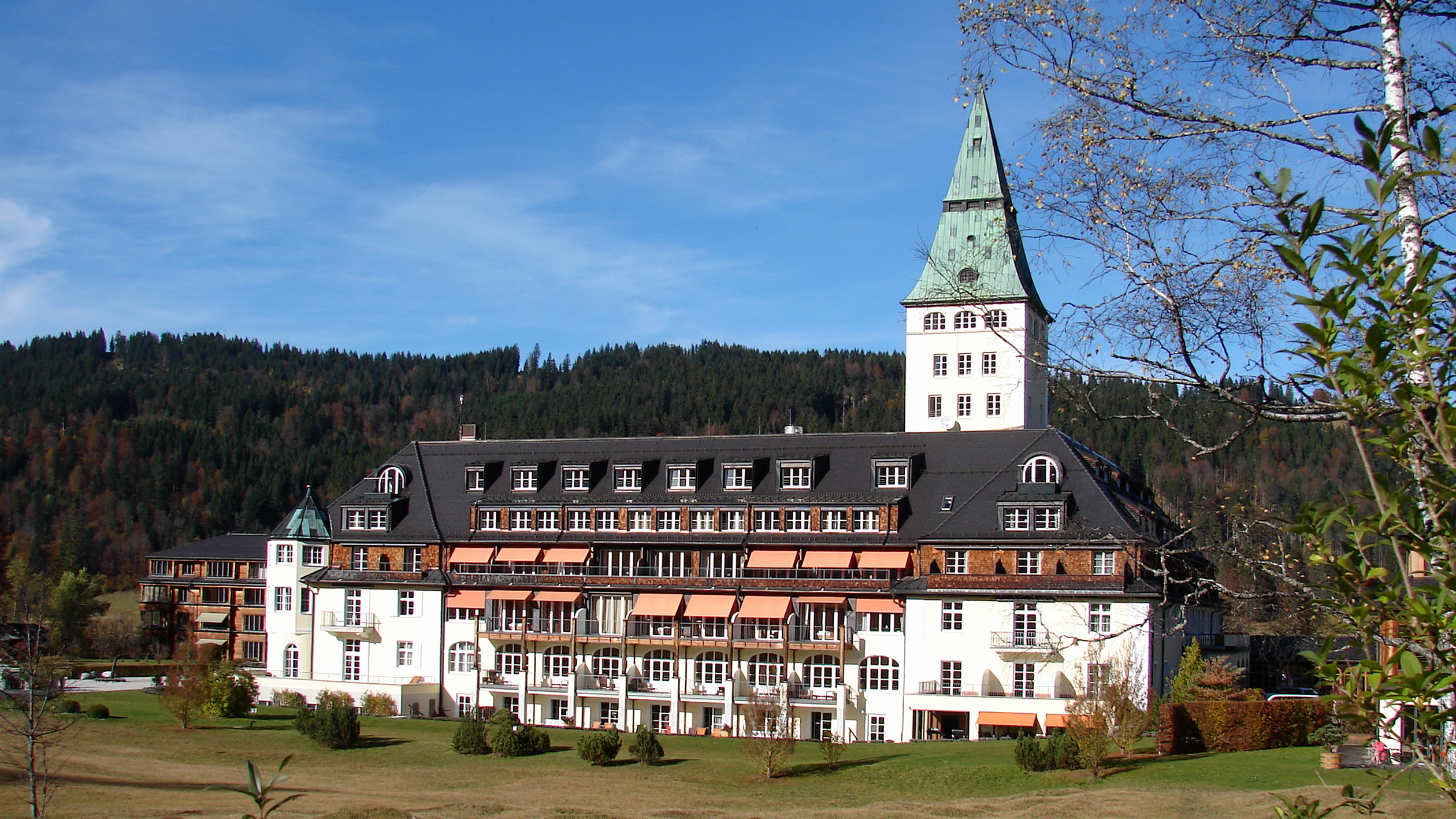
Schloss Elmau in 2015

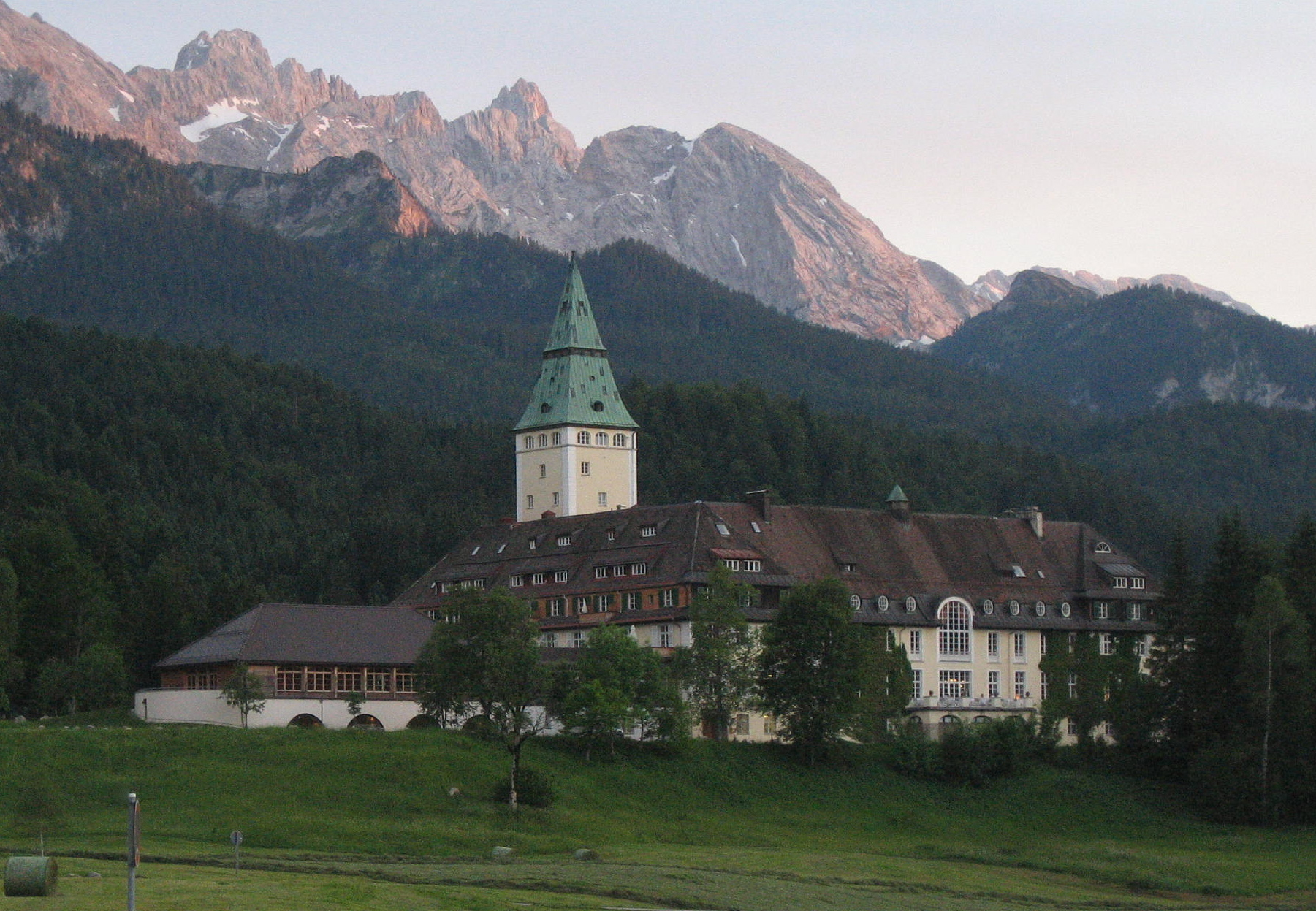
Schloss Elmau in 2005

Schloss Elmau is a four-story castle and national monument with hipped roof, tower and porch, situated between Garmisch-Partenkirchen and Mittenwald in a sanctuary of the Bavarian Alps, Germany. It lies at the foot of the Wetterstein mountains in a Naturschutzgebiet (nature reserve), belonging to the Krün municipality. It was built by philosopher and theologian Johannes Müller and architect Carl Sattler between 1914 and 1916.

== History ==
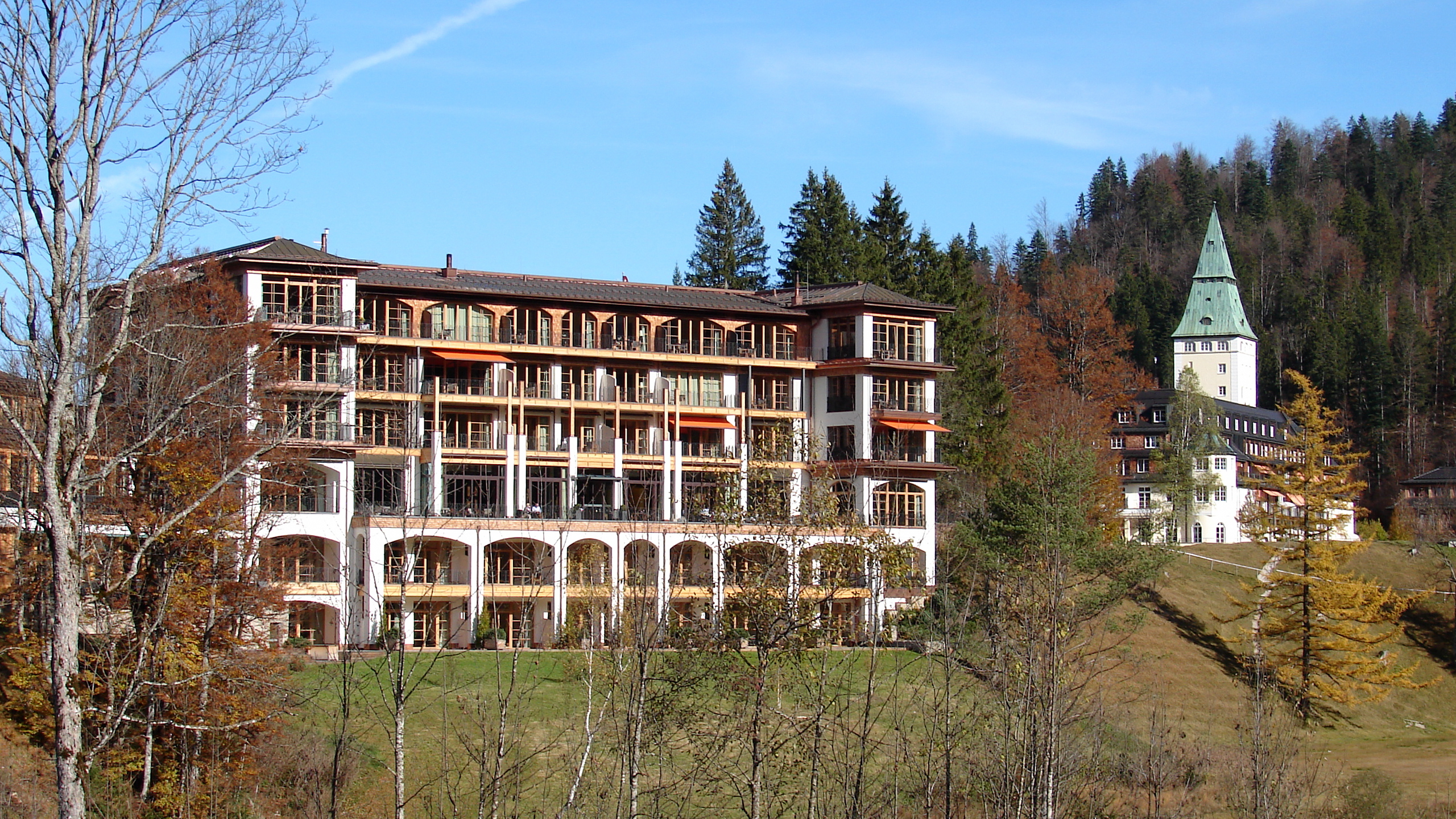
Schloss Elmau Retreat

After Germany's defeat in World War II, Müller lost control of Schloss Elmau. From 1947, the premises served as a home for displaced concentration camp survivors, operated by the American Jewish Joint Distribution Committee.

From 1957, Schloss Elmau became best known for chamber music, with the Amadeus Quartet, Benjamin Britten, Julian Bream, Yehudi Menuhin and Alfred Brendel performing there. Also in 1957, Group 47 chose the castle for one of its semiannual invitation-only retreats.

In the early hours of 7 August 2005 a fire broke out in the Schloss, caused by a faulty electric blanket belonging to the former manager, Ducci Mesirca. The fire destroyed nearly the entire top floor of the main building, without any serious casualties. The hotel has since been rebuilt by architect Christoph Sattler and the Munich-based Architects from DBLB.

It later became a five-star hotel featuring 123 rooms and suites, as well as a 300-seat concert hall and several restaurants. The Schloss Elmau Retreat features 47 suites. The hotel is a forum for international conferences and meetings. It is a member of The Leading Hotels of the World.

The hotel is located in the mountain valley between the city of Garmisch-Partenkirchen (a distance is about 15 km) and Mittenwald in Bavaria at the foot of the Wetterstein mountain range near the village of Klais. The hotel can be reached either by a private road from Klais, or on foot through the Partnach Gorge, the entrance to which is located at the Winter Olympic Stadium in Garmisch-Partenkirchen. The Eckbauer Bahn cable car followed by about 4 km on foot can be used to reach the castle. Near the castle is the four-star hotel Kranzbach, formerly Schloss Kranzbach.

== Culture ==
Several Booker Prize-winners, including Julian Barnes, Zadie Smith and Ian McEwan, have taken part in literary discussions at Schloss Elmau.

== G7 summits ==
Schloss Elmau was the site of the 41st G7 summit on 7–8 June 2015 and the 48th G7 summit on 26–28 June 2022.
