= Heinrich Lhotzky =

German-born Protestant author

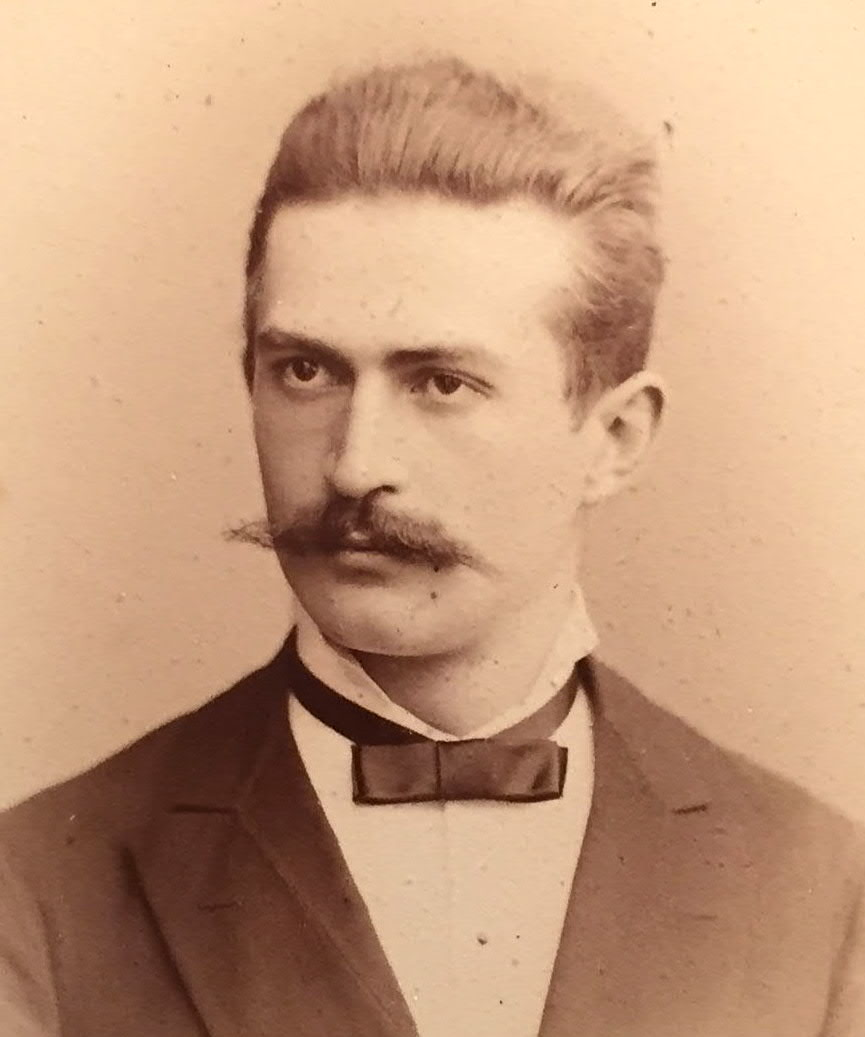
Heinrich Lhotzky (ca. 1880)

Heinrich Lhotzky [lotski] (April 21, 1859 in Klausnitz/Claußnitz – November 24, 1930 in Ludwigshafen am Bodensee) was a German-born Protestant author (religiöser Schriftsteller).

He acted as a pastor for German settlers in Bessarabia (1886–1890).

== Literary works ==
- An co-editor of Blätter zur Pflege des persönlichen Lebens" (1898–1904)
- An editor of the "Leben" (1905–1911)
- Der Weg zum Vater, 1903
- Die Seele deines Kindes, 1908
- Vom Erleben Gottes, 1908
- Das Buch de Ehe, 1911
- Der Planet und ich, 1925
- Wenn man alt wird, 1919
