= Lists of libraries =

This is a list of lists of libraries by location and type.

== Libraries by location ==
=== By country ===
- Afghanistan
- Albania
- Angola
- Armenia
- Australia
  - Australian Capital Territory
  - New South Wales
  - Northern Territory
  - Queensland
  - South Australia
  - Tasmania
  - Victoria
  - Western Australia
- Austria
- Azerbaijan
- Bangladesh
- Belarus
- Belgium
- Belize
- Bosnia and Herzegovina
- Brazil
- Brunei
- Bulgaria
- Canada
  - Ontario
- China
- Colombia
- Cuba
- Czechia
- Denmark
- Estonia
- Finland
- France
- Georgia
- Germany
- Ghana
- Greece
- Hong Kong
- Hungary
- Iceland
- India
- Indonesia
- Iran
- Ireland
- Israel
- Italy
- Japan
- Kazakhstan
- Kenya
- Kosovo
- Latvia
- Lebanon
- Lithuania
- Malaysia
- Malta:
  - Public libraries
- Marshall Islands
- Mexico
- Micronesia
- Nepal
- Netherlands
- New Zealand
- Nigeria
  - Academic libraries
- Norway
- Pakistan
- Palestine
- Philippines
- Poland
- Portugal
- Romania
- Russia
- Serbia
- Singapore
- Slovakia
- Slovenia
- South Africa
- Spain
- Sri Lanka
- Sweden
- Switzerland
- Thailand
- Turkey
- Tuvalu
- Ukraine
- United Kingdom
  - Scotland
- United States
- Venezuela
- Vietnam

=== By region, province, or state ===
- Public libraries in North America
- Goa, India
- Public libraries in Ontario, Canada
- By US state:
  - Public library systems in Georgia
  - Public libraries in Massachusetts
  - Oregon
  - Rhode Island
  - West Virginia

=== By city ===
Asia:

- Baku, Azerbaijan
- Lahore, Pakistan
- Manila, Philippines
- Hyderabad, India
- Seoul, South Korea
- Ankara, Turkey
- Taipei, Taiwan

Europe:

- Hamburg, Germany
- Barcelona, Spain
- Istanbul, Turkey
- Brighton and Hove, England
- London, England:
  - Barnet
  - Bromley
  - Islington
- Public libraries in Cardiff, Wales

North America:

- Toronto Public Library branches
- New York City:
  - Brooklyn Public Library branches
  - New York Public Library branches
  - Queens Public Library branches
- Hennepin County Library branches, Minnesota
- Public libraries in Los Angeles County, California
- Seattle, Washington
- Ponce, Puerto Rico

Oceania:

- Melbourne, Australia

== Libraries by type ==
- National and state libraries
  - U.S. state libraries
- Closed-stack libraries
- Digital library projects

=== Historical ===
- Ancient libraries
- Destroyed libraries
- Libraries damaged during World War II
- Libraries in 19th-century Boston
- Libraries in 19th-century New York City
- Libraries in 19th-century Philadelphia
- Libraries in 18th-century Connecticut
- Libraries in 18th-century Massachusetts

=== By content ===
- African American libraries
- Esperanto libraries
- Medical libraries
- Masonic libraries
- Digital musical document libraries
- Philatelic libraries
- Presidential libraries
  - U.S. presidential libraries
- Science fiction libraries

== By ownership ==
- Libraries owned by Comcast
- Libraries owned by Disney
- Libraries owned by Amazon MGM Studios
- Libraries owned by Paramount Global
- Libraries owned by Sony
- Libraries owned by Warner Bros. Discovery
- Libraries owned by WildBrain

== Other ==
- Largest libraries
- Carnegie libraries
  - List of Carnegie libraries in the United States
  - List of Carnegie libraries in Canada
  - List of Carnegie libraries in Europe
  - Carnegie libraries in Wales
  - List of Carnegie libraries in Africa
  - List of Carnegie libraries in the Caribbean
  - List of Carnegie libraries in Oceania
- Designated libraries in England

== See also ==
- Outline of library and information science for an index to articles related to library science
- List of archives
- List of librarians
- List of library associations
  - List of library associations in India
- List of library consortia
- List of library science schools
- Lists of museums
