= Federal government of Mexico =

- Gobierno federal de México
- Seal of the Government of Mexico
- Formation: 1824; 202 years ago
- Founding document: Constitution of Mexico
- Jurisdiction: Mexico
- Website: www.gob.mx

Legislative branch
- Legislature: Congress of the Union
- Meeting place: Senate Building (Senate); San Lázaro Legislative Palace (Chamber of Deputies)

Executive branch
- Leader: President of Mexico
- Headquarters: National Palace
- Main organ: Cabinet

Judicial branch
- Court: Supreme Court of Justice of the Nation
- Seat: Mexico City

The federal government of Mexico (Spanish: Gobierno de México), alternately known as the Government of the Republic (Spanish: Gobierno de la República), is the national government of the United Mexican States. The Mexican federal government has three branches: executive, legislative, and judicial; and functions under the Constitution of Mexico. The executive branch is headed by the president and their cabinet. Legislative power is vested upon the Congress of Mexico, a bicameral legislature comprising the Senate and the Chamber of Deputies. The judicial branch contains the Supreme Court, the Council of the Federal Judiciary, and the various collegiate, unitary, and district courts.

== Branches of government ==
=== Executive branch ===
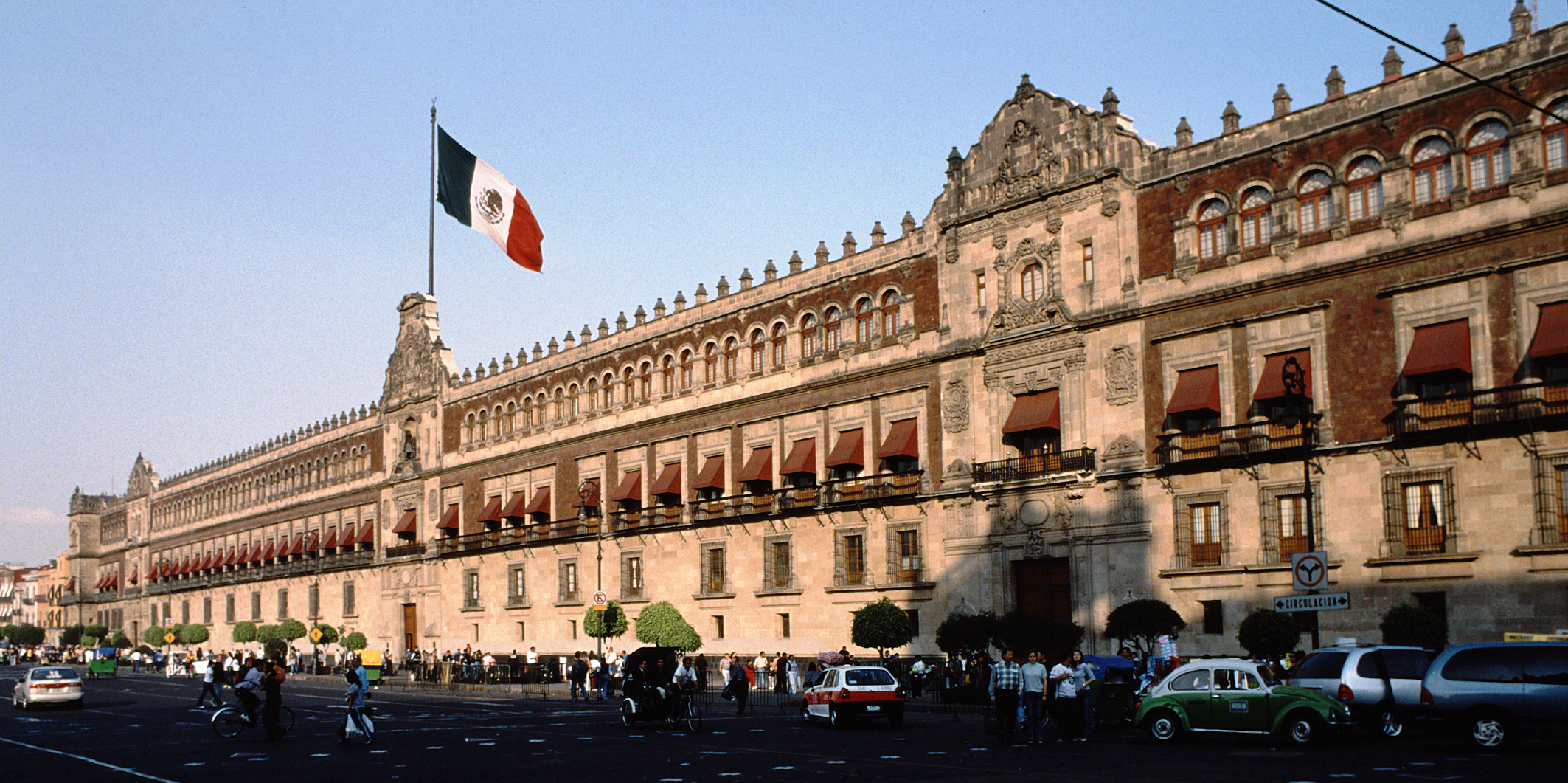
The National Palace, seat of the executive branch

The president is the head of the executive branch, and by extension, the head of government and of state. The president also serves as the commander-in-chief of the Mexican Armed Forces. The president is directly elected by popular vote for a single term of six years. If the office becomes vacant, the Secretariat of the Interior assumes the position ad interim, with Congress electing a replacement to serve the remainder of the term.

The seat of the executive branch, as well as the official residence of the president, is the National Palace. Los Pinos previously served as the president's official residence from 1934 until 2018.

=== Legislative branch ===
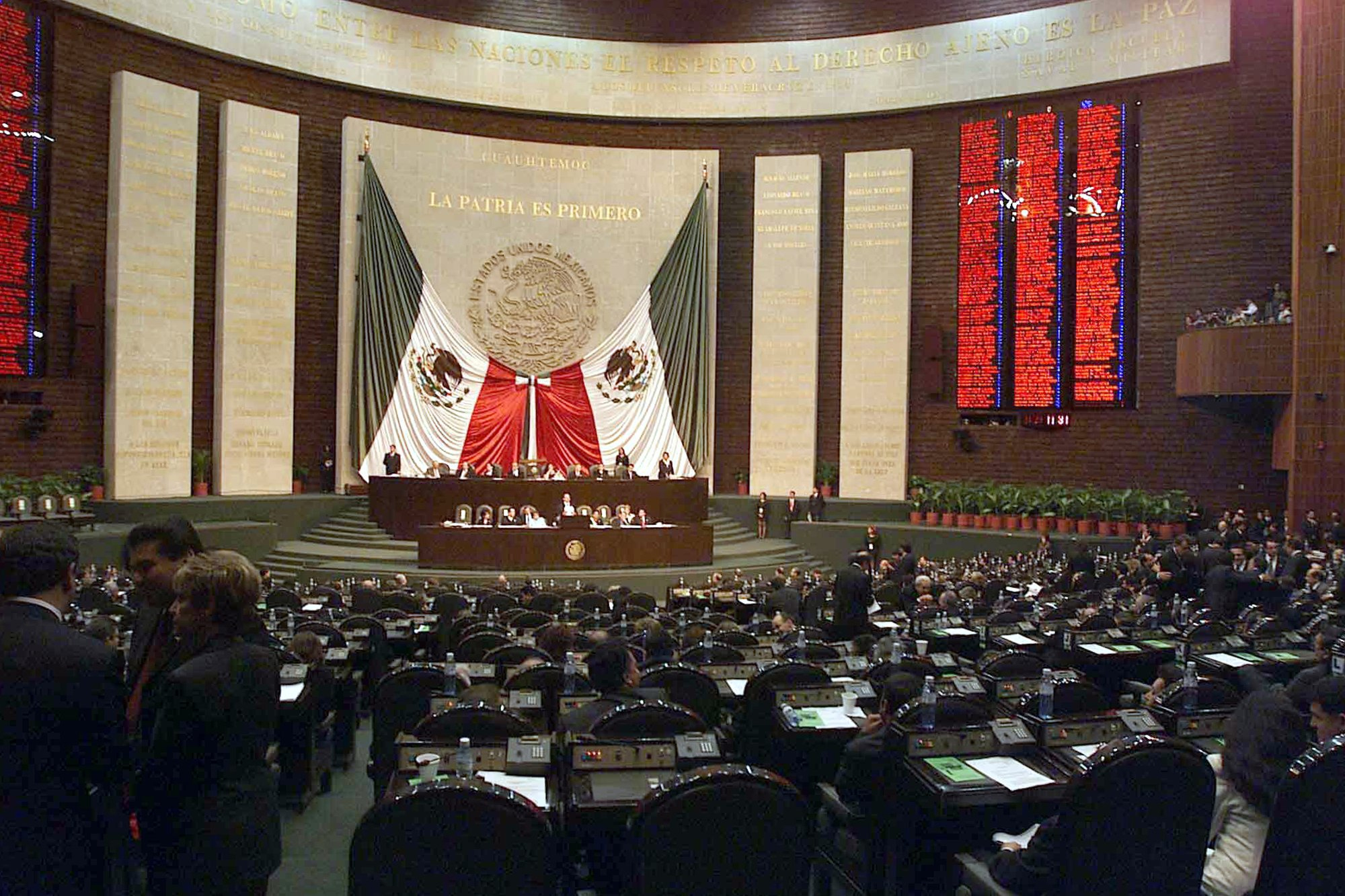
The backdrop of the Mexican Chamber of Deputies, covered with the Constitution of Mexico, Flag of Mexico and cravat. President Vicente Fox in the Mexican Chamber of Deputies.

The legislative power is vested upon the Congress of the Union, a bicameral congress comprising the Senate (Spanish: Cámara de Senadores or Senado) and the Chamber of Deputies (Spanish: Cámara de Diputados). The powers of Congress include the right to pass laws, impose taxes, declare war, approve the national budget, approve or reject treaties and conventions made with foreign countries, and ratify diplomatic appointments. The Senate addresses all matters that concern foreign policy, approves international agreements, and confirms presidential appointments.

The Chamber of Deputies is formed by 500 representatives of the nation. All deputies are elected in free universal elections every three years, in parallel voting: 300 deputies are elected in single-seat constituencies by first-past-the-post plurality (called uninominal deputies), and the remaining 200 are elected by the principle of proportional representation (called plurinominal deputies) with closed-party lists for which the country is divided into five constituencies or plurinominal circumscriptions. Deputies cannot be reelected for the next immediate term.

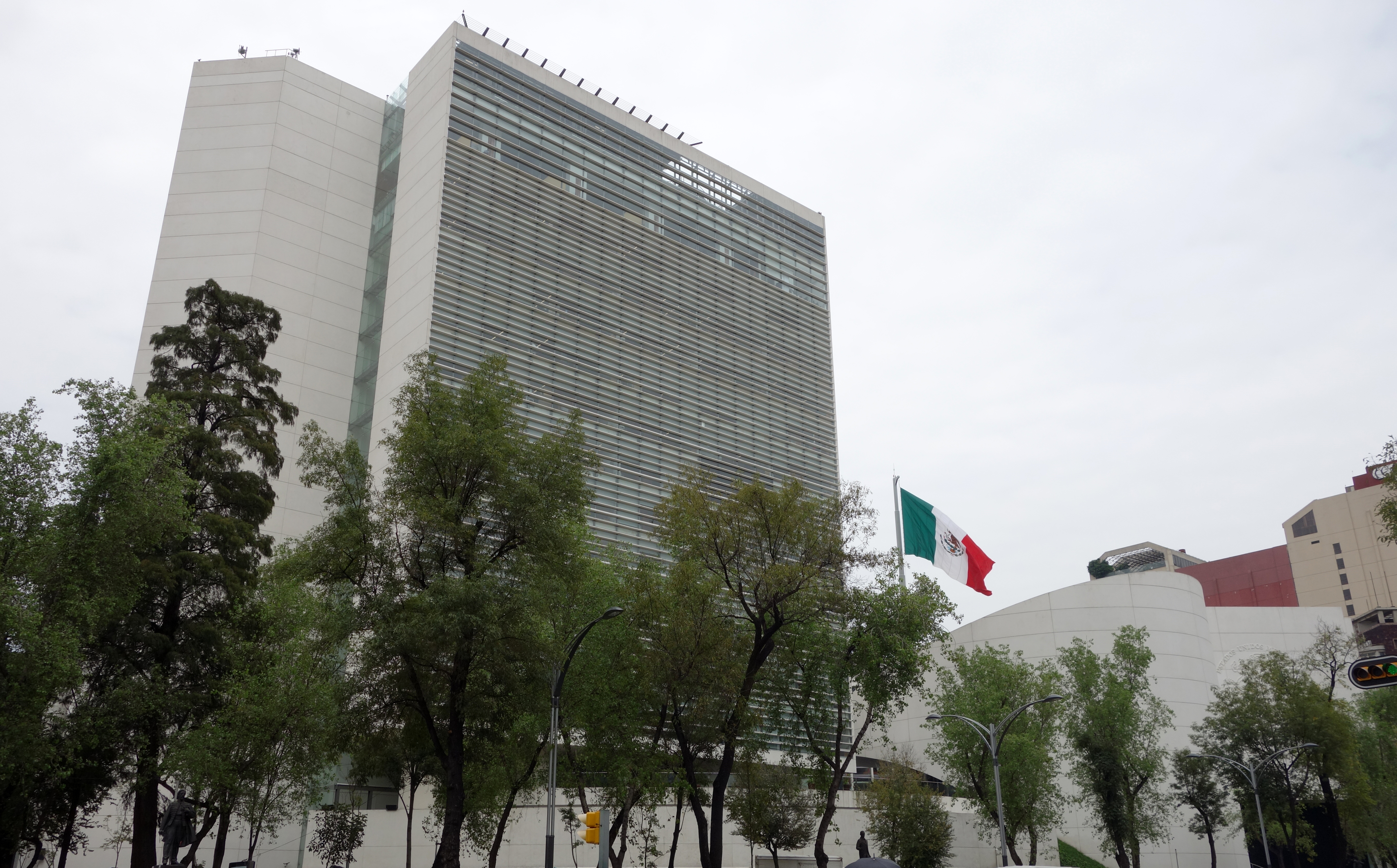
Building of the Senate of the Republic

Being a supplementary system (PM) of parallel voting, proportionality is only confined to the plurinominal seats. However, to prevent a party from being overrepresented, several restrictions to the assignation of plurinominal seats are applied:

- A party must obtain at least 3% of votes to be assigned a plurinominal seat;
- A party's percentage of deputies in the Chamber (uninominal and plurinominal together) cannot be more than 8% greater than the percentage of votes the party obtained in the elections;
- No party can have more than 300 seats (uninominal and plurinominal together), even if the party gets more than 52% of the votes.

The Senate consists of 128 representatives of the constituent states of the federation. All senators are elected in free universal elections every six years through a parallel voting system as well: 64 senators are elected by first-past-the-post plurality, two per state and two for Mexico City elected jointly; 32 senators are assigned through the principle of "first minority", that is, they are awarded to the first runner-up party for each constituent state and Mexico City; and 32 are elected by proportional representation with closed-party lists, for which the country forms a single constituency.

=== Judicial branch ===
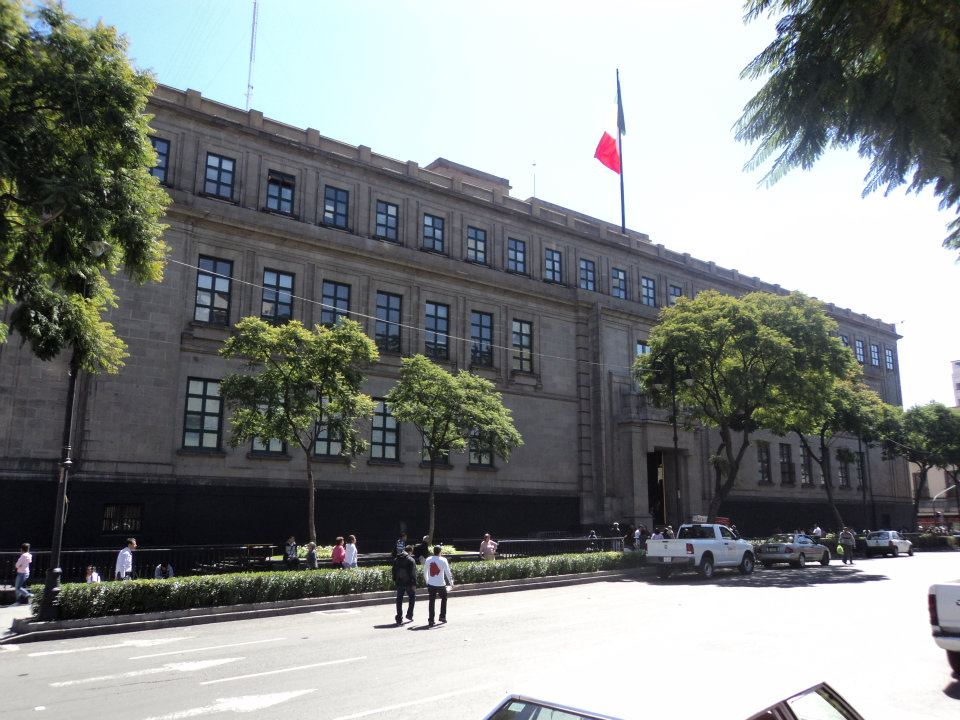
Supreme Court of Justice of the Nation

The judiciary consists of the Supreme Court of Justice of the Nation, composed of nine justices, with five seats being designated for women and four for men, elected by plurality voting, who interpret laws and judge cases of federal competency. Other institutions of the judiciary include the Electoral Tribunal of the Federal Judiciary, as well as collegiate, unitary, and district tribunals, and the Council of the Federal Judiciary. Supreme Court justices serve for twelve years and cannot run for re-election.

== Division of power ==
=== State and local powers ===
The entities of the Mexican Federation are free and sovereigns, autonomous in its internal regime. They have the power to govern themselves according to their own laws; they have their own constitution that does not have to contradict the principles of the federal constitution. The powers of its executive and legislative branches they are understood as those that are the rights of the entities; as the ownership of the command of the public force (state police and national guard attached), direction and regulation of their own economic policies, of social development and public safety; as well as the administration of those resources that arise from their local taxes or own income. Griselda Álvarez was the first female governor in Mexico. Álvarez was Governor of the state of Colima from 1979 to 1985.

=== Internal organization of the states ===
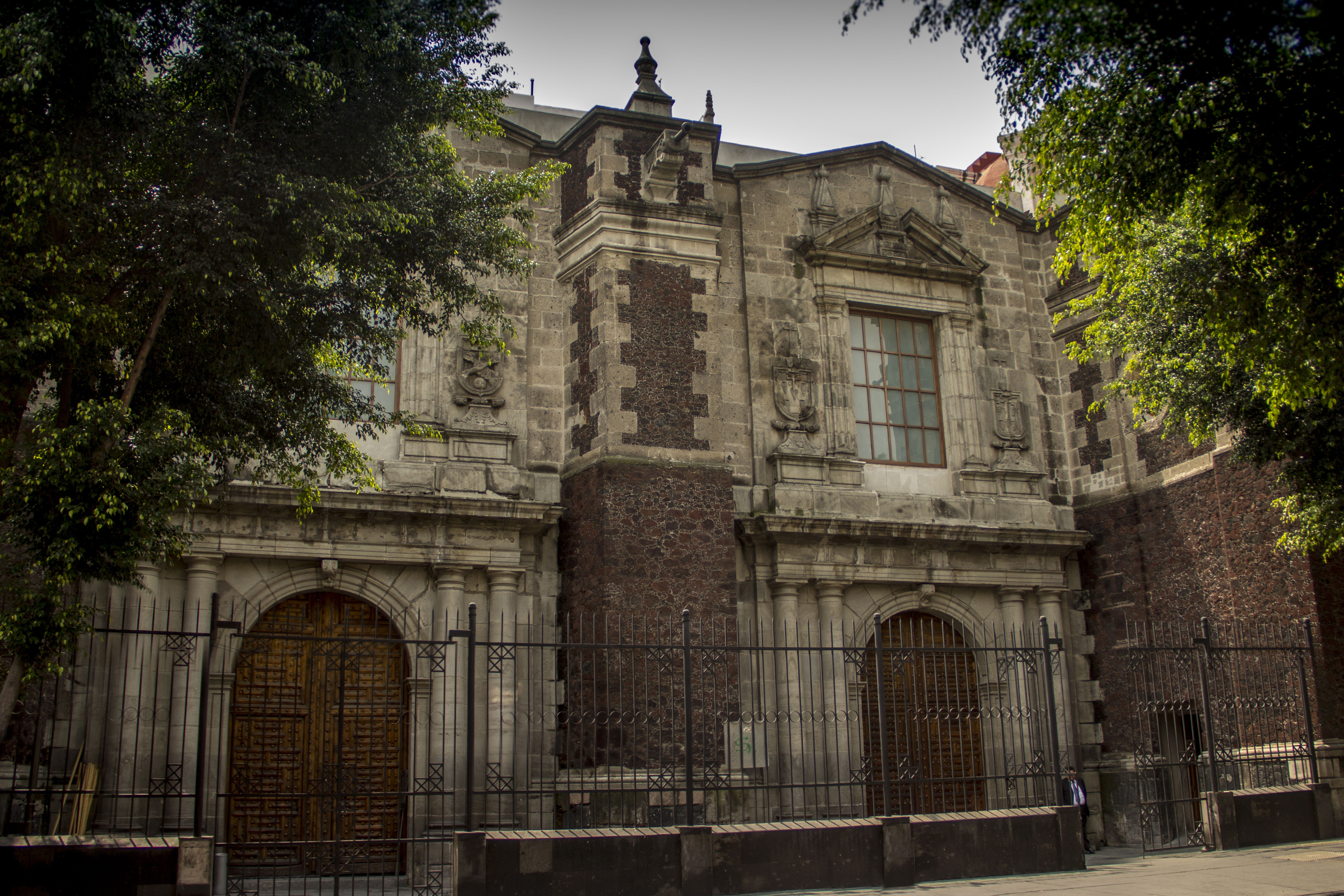
Library of the Congress of Mexico

The states are divided internally into municipalities—or mayors, in the case of Mexico City. Each municipality enjoys autonomy in its capacity to choose its own town hall which is responsible, in most cases; to provide all the public services required by its population. To this concept, which would arise from the Mexican Revolution, it is known as free municipality. The town hall is headed by a municipal president elected every three years.

In addition to municipalities, Mexico's states are also organized into three branches of government: executive, legislative, and judicial. The legislative branch consists of a unicameral state congress (congreso del estado), responsible for passing laws and overseeing state affairs. The judicial branch includes a state court system that administers justice and interprets the law at the state level.

Each state in Mexico has its own constitution, which outlines its specific powers, governance structure, and relationship with the federal government. This decentralized system allows for significant variation in local governance practices and policies across Mexico's diverse states.

=== Mexico City (formerly Federal District) ===
Mexico City does not belong to any state in particular, but to the federation, being the capital of the country and seat of the powers of the Union. As such, it is constituted as a special jurisdiction, ultimately administered by the Powers of the Union. Nonetheless, since the late 1990s certain autonomy and powers have been gradually devolved. The executive power is vested upon a head of government elected by first-past-the-post plurality. The legislative power is vested upon a unicameral Legislative Assembly. The judicial power is exercised by the Supreme Tribunal of Justice and the Judiciary Council.

Mexico City was divided into delegaciones or boroughs. Though not fully equivalent to a municipality in that they do not have regulatory powers, they have gained limited autonomy in recent years, and the representatives to the head of government are now elected by the citizens as well. In 2016, the name was changed to Mexico City and the 16 delegations were transformed into municipalities, each one with its own mayor.

== See also ==
- State governments of Mexico
- Constitution of Mexico
- Politics of Mexico
- Law of Mexico
