= Libraries in Azerbaijan =

Azerbaijani libraries are divided into 2 parts: state and non-state. State libraries are National Library, State Library of the Autonomous Republic of Nakhchivan; city, rayon, town libraries; republican scientific and cultural libraries; libraries of the state, government, enterprises and organizations; the Central Scientific Library of the Academy of Sciences of Azerbaijan and its branches. Non-state libraries are municipal libraries, libraries of public associations, private and other libraries of foreign legal entities and individuals, libraries created in accordance with the law.

== History ==
The history of book and library culture in Azerbaijan is ancient. This culture in Azerbaijan begins from Gobustan Rock Art Cultural Landscape. Already in the Middle Ages, there were 3 types of libraries in Azerbaijan: 1. Palace libraries; 2. Mosque and madrasah libraries; 3. Private libraries. The first publicly accessible library on the territory of modern Azerbaijan was opened on August 1, 1894 with the permission of Baku’s Governor Gorchakov. But its activity did not last long. In 1923, the National Library was opened, which still exists today, and is the largest and most well-known library in the country. Besides it, the most famous are the Presidential Library, the Central Scientific Library of ANAS and the Republican Youth Library named after Jafar Jabbarly.

In Azerbaijan, the library system includes state and non-state libraries. The main principles of state policy in the field of library work and the obligations of the state are providing accessibility of cultural and informational resources for all, protection and development of funds of the state library, national libraries and the creation of a permanent supply system of foreign literature, etc.

== National Library ==
National Library of Azerbaijan

The National Library of Azerbaijan is one of the largest national libraries in the Caucasus. The official opening took place on May 23, 1923. In 1925, the fund numbered 51,000 books, magazines, newspapers and other printed materials. In 1928 this figure reached 300,000. In 1939, the library was named after the Azerbaijani educator, playwright and thinker Mirza Fatali Akhundzadeh. In 2004, by decision of the Cabinet of Ministers, the Library was granted the status of “National”.

In 1999, the library began work on automation and computerization. In 2000, the Internet library was opened under the National Library. The Training Center was established at the library in 2001. In 2008, a virtual reading room of the electronic dissertation fund of the Russian State Library was opened at the National Library. Since 2005, the National Library is a member of the international organization of the Conference of European National Librarians (CENL). It also cooperates with the Library Assembly of Eurasia (LAE), the European Library, the Board of Directors of the National Libraries of Turkic-speaking countries, and the Council of National Libraries of the Organization of Economic Co-operation and development.

== Presidential Library ==
The Presidential Library for the Affairs of the President of the Republic of Azerbaijan was established in 2003 on the basis of two libraries: Baku City - Central City Library (former Library named after Lenin) and the Library of General Service Section of the Azerbaijan Republic President's Administration (former Library of the Political Education House). The Library collection consists of rare book copies on various languages published in the XVI-XIX and at the beginning of the XX century. The Library is dominated by materials on economics, politics, state-building, law, philosophy, statistics, history, literature and linguistics. Generally, the library fund includes 250 magazines, newspapers and other periodicals published in the republic and other countries.

== ANAS Central Library of Science ==
ANAS Central Library of Science

The Central Scientific Library of Azerbaijan National Academy of Sciences has been operating since November 1923. The library fund was established in its first years. At that time, the library collection consisted of 430 books and 200 manuscripts. At the initial stage, the Azerbaijani intelligentsia played an important role in the organization of the library fund. They handed over books to library from their own libraries. In 1934, a special exchange fund was created in the IEC for the exchange of printed materials with scientific organizations of the USSR and foreign countries. In 1967, it moved to the main building of ANAS, located on the campus of the IEC Academy. In 1972 the Centralized Library System of ANAS was created. The purpose of the creation of the Central Scientific Library is to promote the political, economic, social and cultural achievements of Azerbaijan, to expand the use of the Azerbaijani language in information resources, to improve the information support of modern scientific research.

== Republican Youth Library named after Jafar Jabbarly ==
Republican Youth Library was founded in 1928. In the first years of its creation, the library consisted of a small number of books and a single service department. In 1937, the library was named in honor of Jafar Jabbarli, one of the founders of modern Azerbaijani drama. In 1976, by the decree of the Ministry of Culture of the Republic of Azerbaijan dated February 5, 1976, the library was granted the status of a youth library. The library consists of 9 departments. Its fund is constantly enriched with classical and modern Azerbaijani literature, world literature, dictionaries and encyclopedias, textbooks, scientific and popular literature. The library fund include 132 thousand 399 copies. As of January 1, 2015, the library collection numbers reached 132 thousand 399 copies of books, 2 thousand 382 CDs and DVDs. The electronic catalog of the book includes 11,500 books, 186 CDs and DVDs.

== Sabir Central City Library ==
The Central City Library (azerb. Mirzə Ələkbər Sabir adına Mərkəzi Şəhər Kitabxanası) was opened in March 1919 according to the decision of the Department of culture and education of the Union of Azerbaijani Consumer Society, adopted in 1918.

In 1941, the first bibliographic department was established in the Central City Library.

== Library for the visually impaired of Azerbaijan ==
Library for the visually impaired of Azerbaijan (azerb. Respublika Gözdənəlillər Kitabxanası) was established in 1981 according to decree of the Presidium of the Central Administration of the Society of the Blind of Azerbaijan dated May 23, 1980.

In January 1994, the library was transferred to the Ministry of Culture of Azerbaijan.

The library contains books printed in Braille, as well as audio-books.

== Other libraries ==
=== Scientific Library of BSU ===
The Scientific library of Baku State University was opened in 1919 on the initiative of the government of the Azerbaijan Democratic Republic. According to the order of the Council of People's Commissars, in 1920–1922, books from various departments and organizations were transferred to the library. In accordance with the resolution of the Ministry of Education of Azerbaijan No. 131 of 1971, the Scientific library of BSU was turned into a scientific and methodological center, the main purpose of which is to regulate the work of libraries of educational institutions of the country. Since 1998, cooperation has been carried out with the Open Society Institute.

=== Parliamentary Library ===
The Parliamentary Library of Azerbaijan was established in 1997. The library was founded with the support of the Grand National Assembly of Turkey. In 2000, a coordination center was established for the exchange of official documents and books between the parliamentary libraries of the CIS countries.

=== Library of Khazar University ===
The Khazar University library and information center (KULIC) is the library of Khazar University.

=== ADA University Library ===
ADA University Library is the library of ADA University, providing academic resources, study spaces, and digital collections to support students and faculty.

== See also ==
- Libraries in Baku
- List of libraries in Azerbaijan
