= Libraries in Honduras =

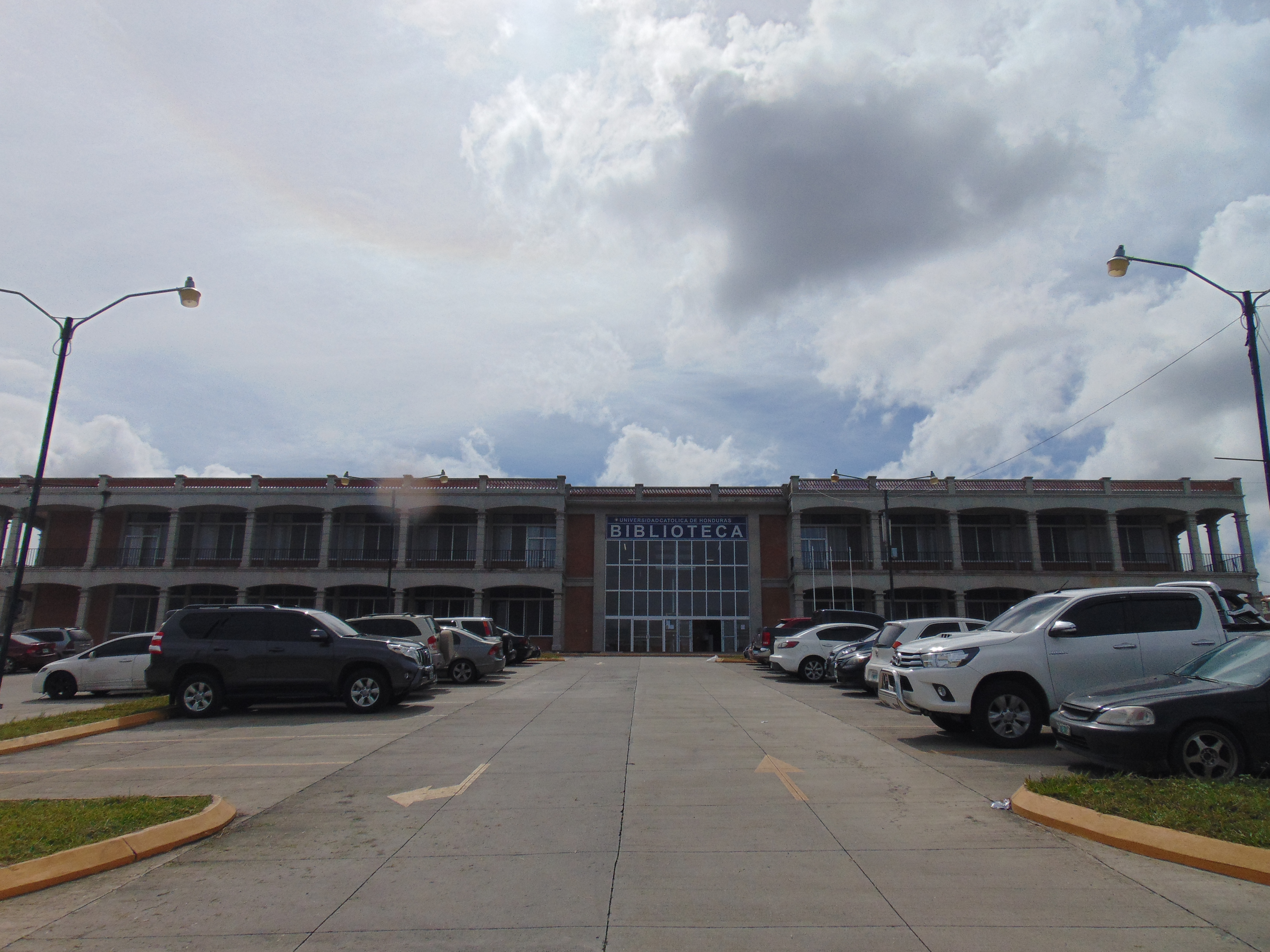
Library of the Catholic University of Honduras

Honduras has four main public libraries, the National Library Juan Ramón Molina, the Library of the Autonomous National University of Honduras and the Skilled Library of Art Queen Sofia.

One of the first libraries in Honduras was the personal library of the doctor in laws and first president of Honduras, Dionisio of Herrera, composed mainly by books written in French. It was ignited during his presidential period in 1826 by his oppositionists accusing to keep books "herejes".

In 2001 Honduras agreed to invest 18 billion lempiras in social projects of education, health and culture between 2001 and 2015, during this time did not create new schools neither new areas green and recreational neither new public libraries for the students.

== Juan Ramón Molina National Library ==
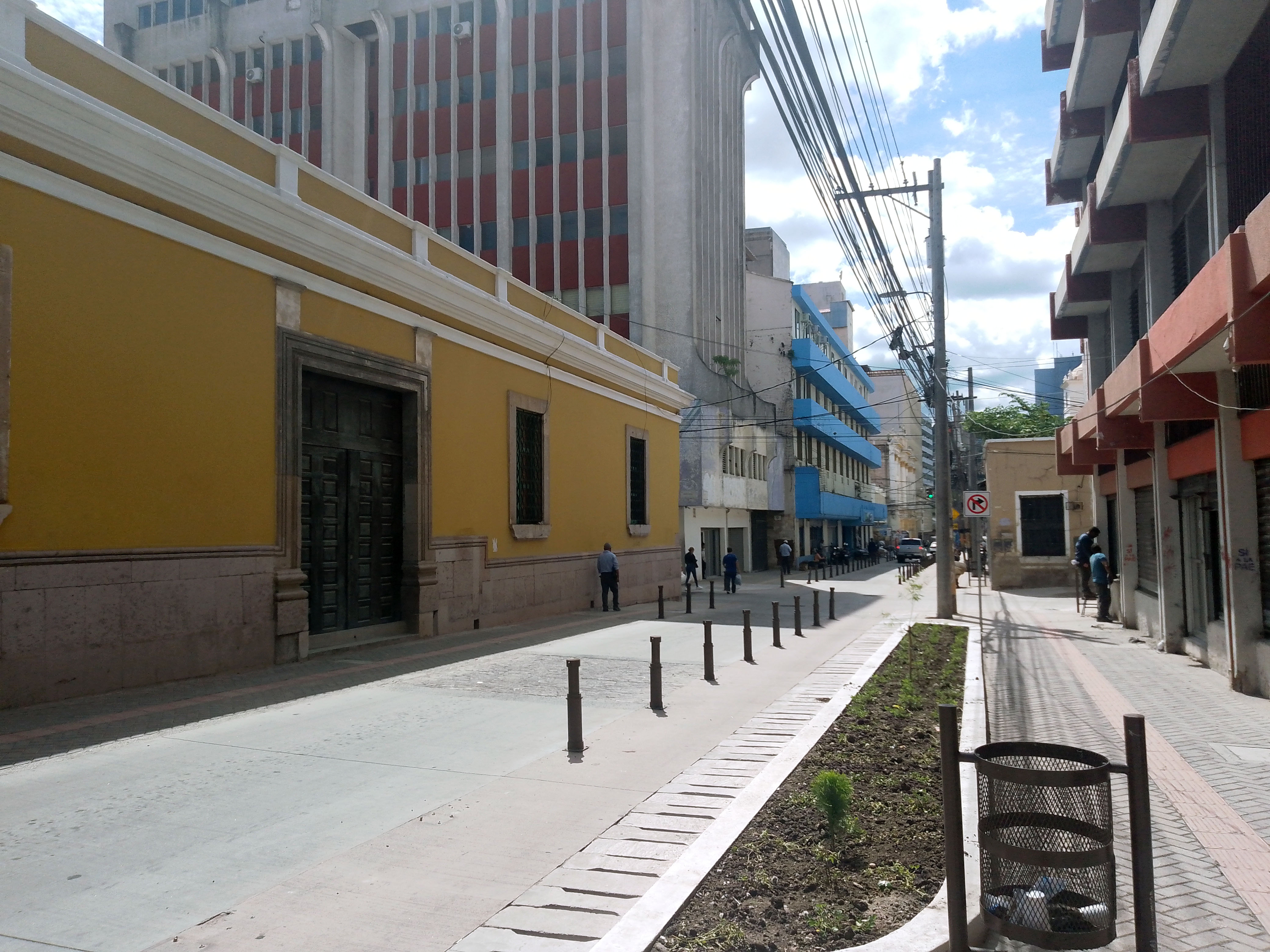
Juan Ramón Molina National Library

National Library of Honduras is a public library founded on 27 August 1880 in the administration of Marco Aurelio Soto, by means of agreement of 11 February, with a budget assigned of one thousand weights.

== Library of the Autonomous National University of Honduras ==
The system librarian of the National Autonomous University of Honduras (UNAH) initiates like library of the university centre of regional studies in the year 1970 and later becomes the central library of the UNAH. It has more than 100 one thousand books and magazines.

Recently they assigned 20 million Lempiras to create a new building of library for the UNAH.

== Library of Art Queen Sofia ==
Library Queen Sofia finds situated in the installations of the Museum of the Honduran Man, in Tegucigalpa. The name of the library is in honour to His Majesty Mrs. Sofia of Greece, Reigns of Spain.

== See also ==
- Culture of Honduras
- History of libraries in Latin America
