= List of museums in Mexico =

This is a list of museums and galleries in Mexico.

== Museums and galleries ==
=== Aguascalientes ===
- Aguascalientes Museum
- Guadalupe Posada Museum
- Museo Descubre (IMAX screen)
- Museum of Contemporary Art
- Museo Espacio - MECA
- National Museum of Death
- State History Museum
- Museo Ferrocarrilero de Aguascalientes
- Museum of Traditional Mexican Toys
- Centro Cultural Los Arquitos
- Insurgency Museum
- Museo Comunitario Tepetzalán

=== Baja California ===
- Tijuana Cultural Center
- Tijuana Wax Museum
- Tijuana Trompo Museum
- Museo Sol del Niño (IMAX screen)
- Museo Universitario Mexicali (has photos, fossils, etc. of Baja California Norte)
- History of the City of Ensenada
- El Museo de la Vid y el Vino

=== Baja California Sur ===
- Regional Museum of Anthropology and History
- Museum of Jesuit Missions
- Museum of Natural History in Cabo San Lucas
- Museum of Saint Ignacio paintings
- Museum of Telecommunications Tomás Guzmán Cantú

=== Campeche ===
- Museum of the City of Campeche
- Museum of San Miguel Fort
- Archaeology Museum
- Weapons and Navy Museum

=== Chiapas ===
- Regional Museum of Anthropology and History of Chiapas
- Museum of Santo Domingo Ex Convent
- Museum of Tapachula
- Museum of Mayan Medicine
- Museum of the city of Tuxtla Gutierrez
- Archaeological Museum of Comitán
- Archaeological Museum of Palenque
- Museo del Ámbar de Chiapas (Amber Museum)

=== Chihuahua ===
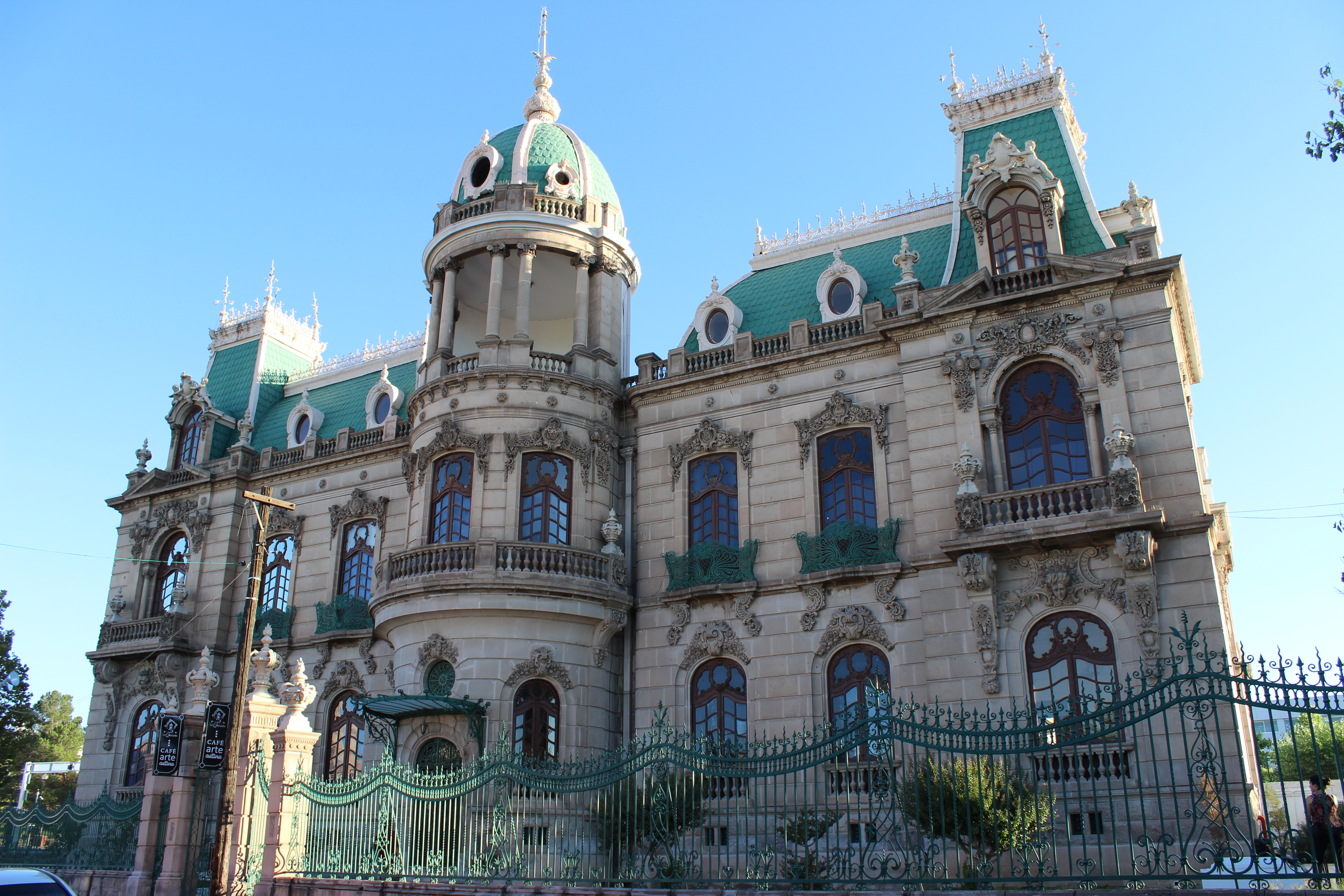
Quinta Gameros

- Francisco Villa Museum
- Historical Museum of the Mexican Revolution
- Museo de las Culturas del Norte
- Quinta Gameros
- Museo de Arte de Ciudad Juárez
- Museo de la Revolución en la Frontera

=== Coahuila ===
- Museo del Desierto
- Museo de las Aves de México
- Museo Arocena

=== Colima ===
- Regional Museum of the History of Colima

=== Durango ===
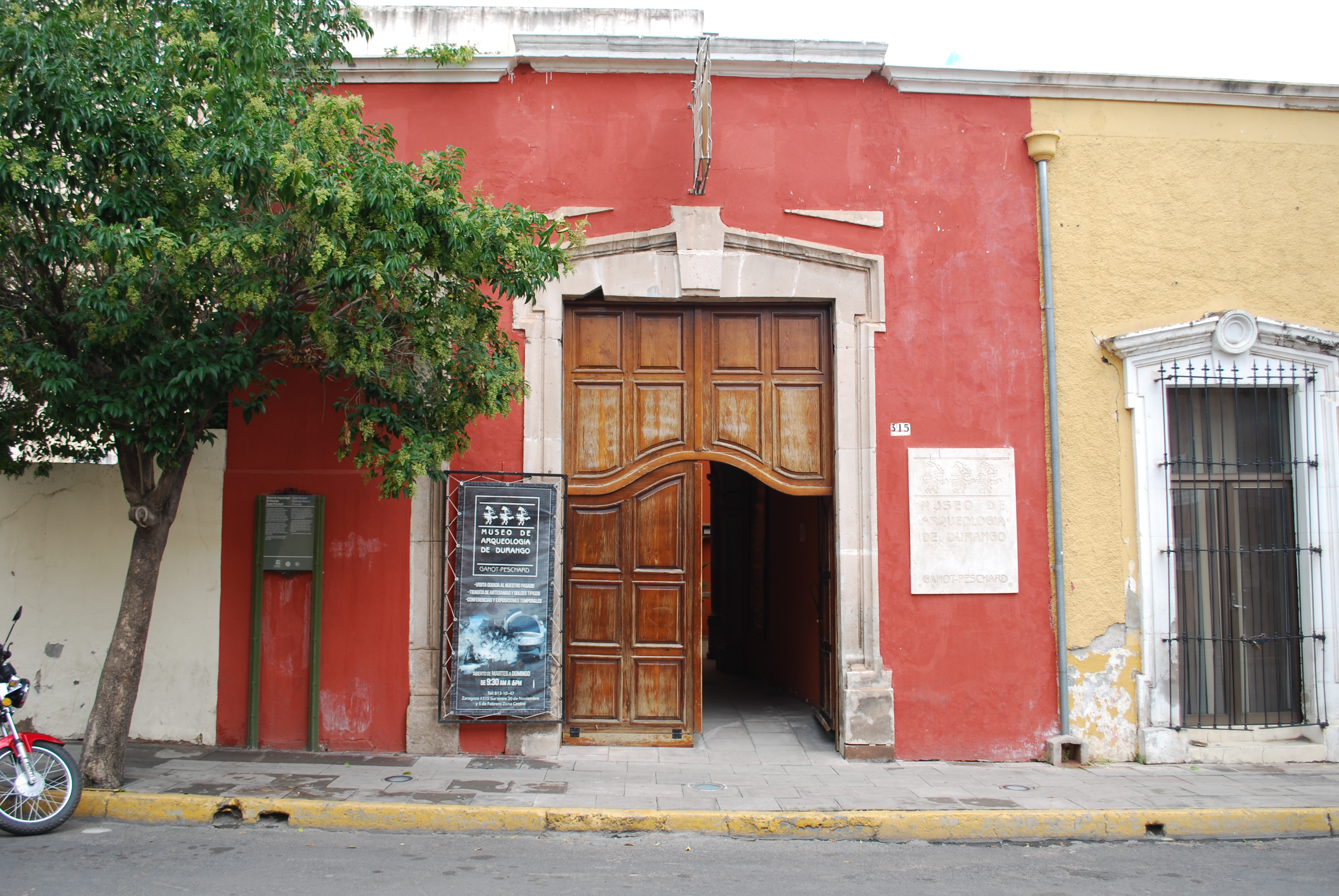
Ganot-Peschard

- Ganot-Peschard Museum of Archeology
- Museo de la Ferrería
- Regional Museum of Durango

=== Guanajuato ===
- Museo Casa Estudio Diego Rivera y Frida Kahlo
- Mummy Catacombs
- Explora Science Center (IMAX screen)
- Iconographic Museum of Quixote
- San Miguel de Allende Museum
- Saint Paul Convent Museum
- Museo de la Ciudad, León
- Museo Regional de Guanajuato Alhóndiga de Granaditas

=== Guerrero ===
- Regional Museum of Guerrero
- Historic Museum of Acapulco
- William Spratling Museum

=== Hidalgo ===
- Historical Archive and Museum of Mining, Pachuca
- National Photography Museum
- Mining Museum
- Tula Archeological Museum

=== Jalisco ===
- Tequila and Mariachi Museum
- Paleontology Museum of Guadalajara
- Medicine History Museum
- Huichol Art Museum
- Newspaper and Graphic Arts Museum
- Army and Air Force Museum
- Science and Technology Museum
- Ceramics Museum
- Wax Museum
- Museum of Guadalajara Art
- Museum of Zapopan Art
- Museum of the City of Guadalajara
- Museo "Casa Agustín Rivera".
- Museo del Cuale.
- Museo Arqueológico de Ciudad Guzmán.
- Museo Raúl Anguiano
- Arte Vallarta Museo, Puerto Vallarta

=== Mexico City ===
The Mexican government published a guide to Mexico City museums in 2016.

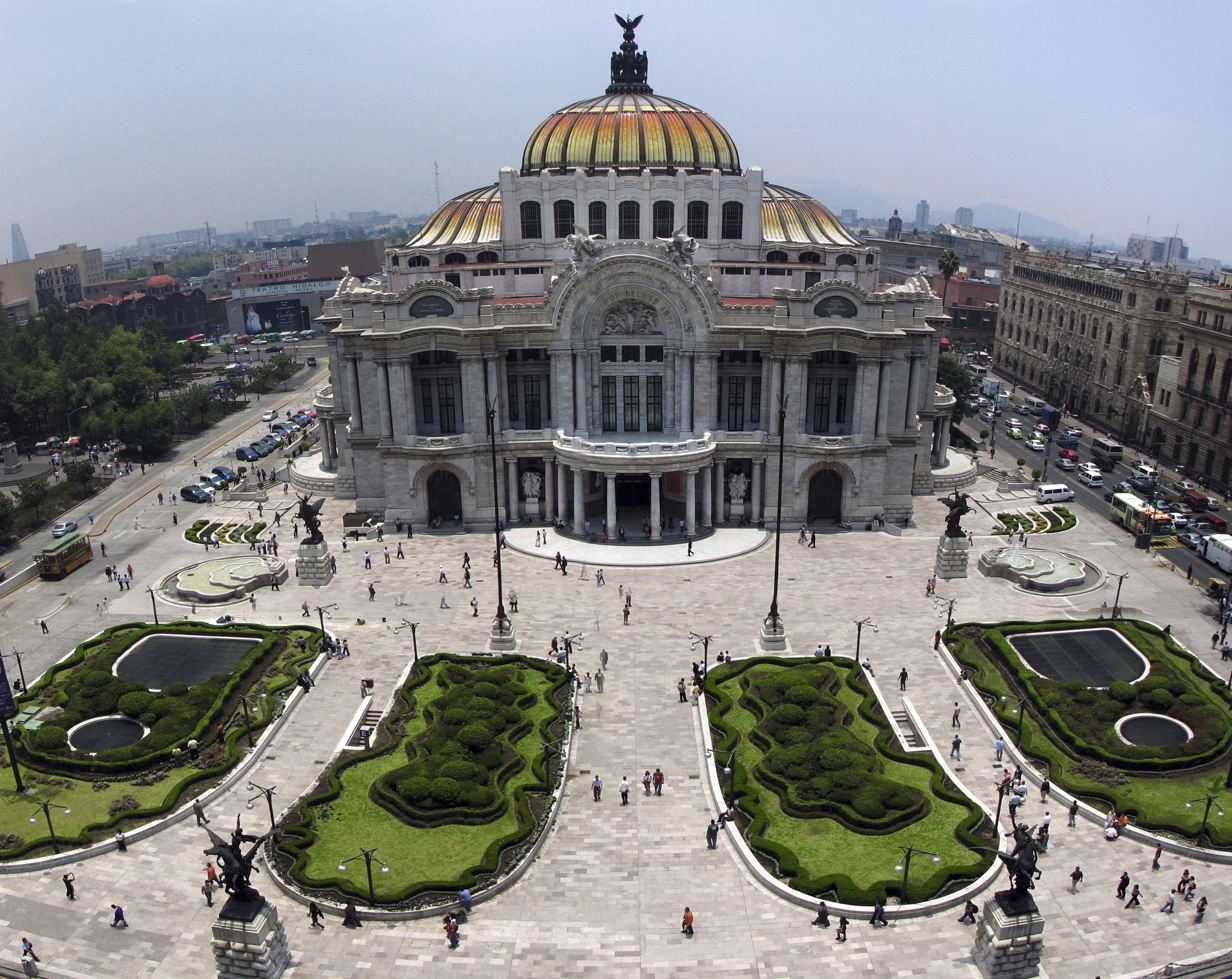
Palacio de Bellas Artes

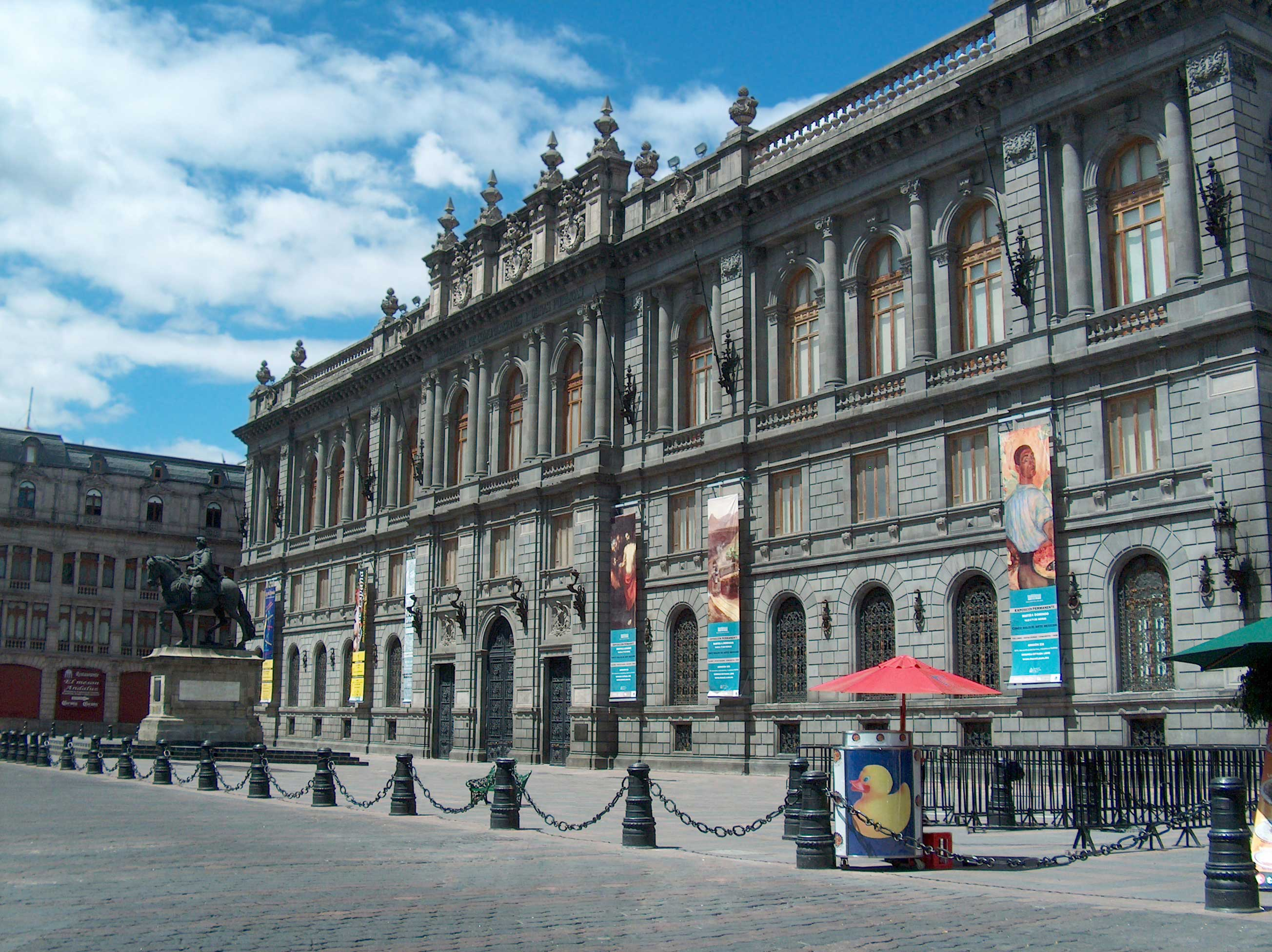
Museo Nacional de Arte (MUNAL)

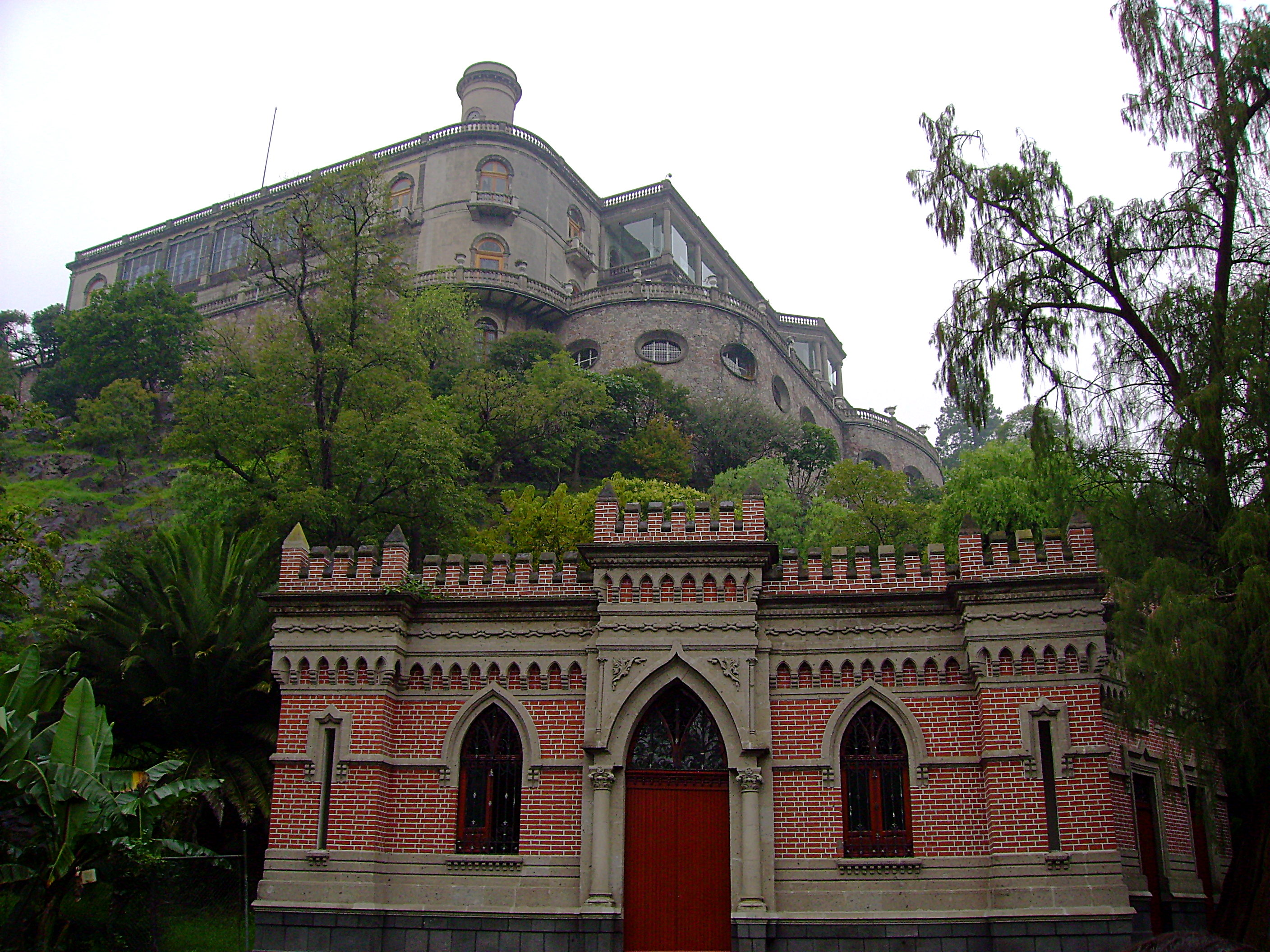
Museo Nacional de Historia

- Alameda Art Laboratory
- Altepepialcalli Regional Museum – Milpa Alta
- Alvaro and Carmen T. de Carrillo Gil Museum of Art
- Anahuacalli Museum
- Blaisten Collection Museum
- UAEM Casa de Cultura Tlalpan
- Archeological Museum of Azcapotzalco Príncipe Tlaltecatzin - Azcapotzalco
- Archeological Museum of Cuicuilco
- Archeological Museum of Xochimilco
- Archeological Park of Luis G. Urbina
- Archeological Zone of the Templo Mayor
- Army and Air Force Museum of Mexico
- Automobile Museum of Mexico
- Calmecac Cultural Center – Barrio Santa Martha
- Cárcamo de Dolores, Bosque de Chapultepec.
- Caricature Museum of Mexico 99 Donceles, Centro
- Casa del Lago
- Casa Lamm Cultural Center
- Casa Luis Barragán House of architect Luis Barragán
- Casasola Photography Bazaar 26 Madero
- Centro de la Imagen (art)
- Chapel of San Antonio Panzacola – Barrio Santa Catarina
- The Chapultepec Castle National Museum of History
- Charrería Museum
- Chopo University Museum
- Cloister of Sor Juana Ines de la Cruz – Plaza de San Jeronimo 47 Centro
- Colegio de San Ildefonso
- Convent El Carmen Museum
- Cuauhnahuac Regional Museum
- Culhuacan Community Center
- Cuitlahuac Museum
- Diego Rivera Mural Museum
- Dr. Samuel Fastlicht Museum – UNAM
- Dolores Olmedo Patiño Museum
- El Carmen Museum (art)
- Estanquillo Museum
- Ex Hacienda El Molino Cultural Center
- Ex Hacienda San Gabriel de Barrera
- Ex Templo de Santa Teresa La Antigua
- Ex Templo San Agustin – (anthropology)
- Ex Teresa Convent Modern Art Museum – Centro
- Felix de Jesus Museum – Escandon
- Franz Mayer Museum
- Frida Kahlo Museum (Casa Azul)
- Frissac House – Tlalpan borough
- Fuego Nuevo Museum
- Geles Cabrera Museum of Sculpture – Coyoacan
- General Archive of the Nation of Mexico (history)
- Geological Museum of UNAM – Jaime Torres Bodet 176 Santa Maria la Ribera Cuauhtemoc
- Geology and Sciences of the Herat Museum - National Polytechnic Institute Bldg 9
- Gonzalo Lopez Cid Auditorium - Citlalmina
- Guadalupe Basílica Museum
- Hacienda de San Cristóbal Polaxtla Museum
- Hacienda de Santa Mónica Museum
- Hellenic Cultural Institute of Mexico (Instituto Cultural Helénico)
- Hidalgo Social and Cultural Center – Tlapan
- House and Museum of Alfonso Reyes
- House Studio of Diego Rivera and Frida Kahlo
- House of the First Print Shop in the Americas
- Interactive Museum of Economics – Tacuba Street
- Jaime Torres Bodet Cultural Center
- Jesús Reyes Heroles Casa de Cultura – Coyoacan
- José Luis Cuevas Museum
- Jose Maria Velasco Gallery
- Lebanese Center of Mexico
- The Leon Trotsky Museum
- Luis Enrique Erro Planetarium
- Memory and Tolerance Museum
- Mexico City Museum
- Mexico City’s Wax Museum
- Miguel Hidalgo People’s Social Center– San Juan de Aragon 2nd section
- Mixquic Archeological Museum – Tlahuac borough
- Museo de Arte Moderno
- Museum of Light (Museo de la Luz)
- Museo Archivo de la Fotografía
- Museum of Mexican Constitutions
- Museum of Mexican Medicine – Brasil 33 Centro
- Museum of Natural History (Mexico City)
- Museum of the Palace of Fine Arts
- Museum of Parliament Precinct
- Museo de Arte Moderno
- Museum of Popular Art
- Museo de la Bola Museum
- Museum of SHCP
- Museo del Estanquillo
- National Photography Museum
- Museum in Honor of Benito Juarez - National Palace
- National Anthropological Museum.
- National Center of the Arts of Mexico
- National Museum of Art
- National Museum of Cultures- Moneda 13 Centro
- National Museum of Popular Cultures
- Museo Nacional de Historia. Castillo de Chapultepec.
- National Museum of Graphic Arts – Mar Arafura 8 Popotla Miguel Hidalgo
- Nacional Museum of Engraving (Museo de la Estampa) - Plaza de Santa Vera Cruz
- Museo Nacional de las Intervenciones
- Museum of Women
- National Museum of Popular Cultures Coyacan
- National Museum of Popular Arts and Industries – Ave Juarez 44 Centro Cuauhtemoc
- National Museum of Popular Culture
- National Museum of the Revolution
- Naval History Museum of Mexico – Coyacan
- Necroteca Museum – UNAM
- Ollin Yoliztli Cultural Center
- Palace of Autonomy Museum
- Palace of Iturbide (art)
- Palace of Mining
- Paleontology Museum – UNAM
- Papalote Children’s Museum (IMAX screen)
- The Postal Museum
- Papalote museo del niño (IMAX Screen)
- Pinacoteca de la Profesa
- R. Flores Magon Casa de la Cultura – Ex Ejido San Pablo Tepetlapa
- Rafael Solana Cultural Center
- Ripley’s Believe it or not Museum, Londres St Juarez
- Risco House Museum
- The Rufino Tamayo Museum
- San Angel Cultural Center– San Angel
- The San Carlos Museum, Puente de Alvarado 50 Revolucion Cuauhtemoc
- Siqueiros Cultural Polyforum
- Siquieros Hall of Public Art
- The Snail Museum Gallery of Natural History
- Soumaya Museum
- Spanish Cultural Center – Centro
- Technological Museum of the Federal Commission of Electricity
- Tlahuac Regional Museum – Tlahuac borough
- Tlalpan History Museum – Tlapan
- UNAM Sculpture Space (Espacio Escultorico UNAM) Ciudad Universitaria
- University Museum of Sciences and Arts
- Venustiano Carranza Museum (history)
- Victoria Museum of Telephony – Centro
- Watercolor Museum (Museo de la Acuarela), Villa Coyoacan
- Universum (UNAM) (science)

=== Michoacán ===
- Museum of Popular Arts and Industries
- Museo Casa de Morelos.
- Museo Regional Michoacano "Dr. Nicolás León Calderón".
- Museo de Sitio de Tzintzuntzan.
- Museo de la Estampa Ex Convento de Santa María Magdalena.

=== Morelos ===
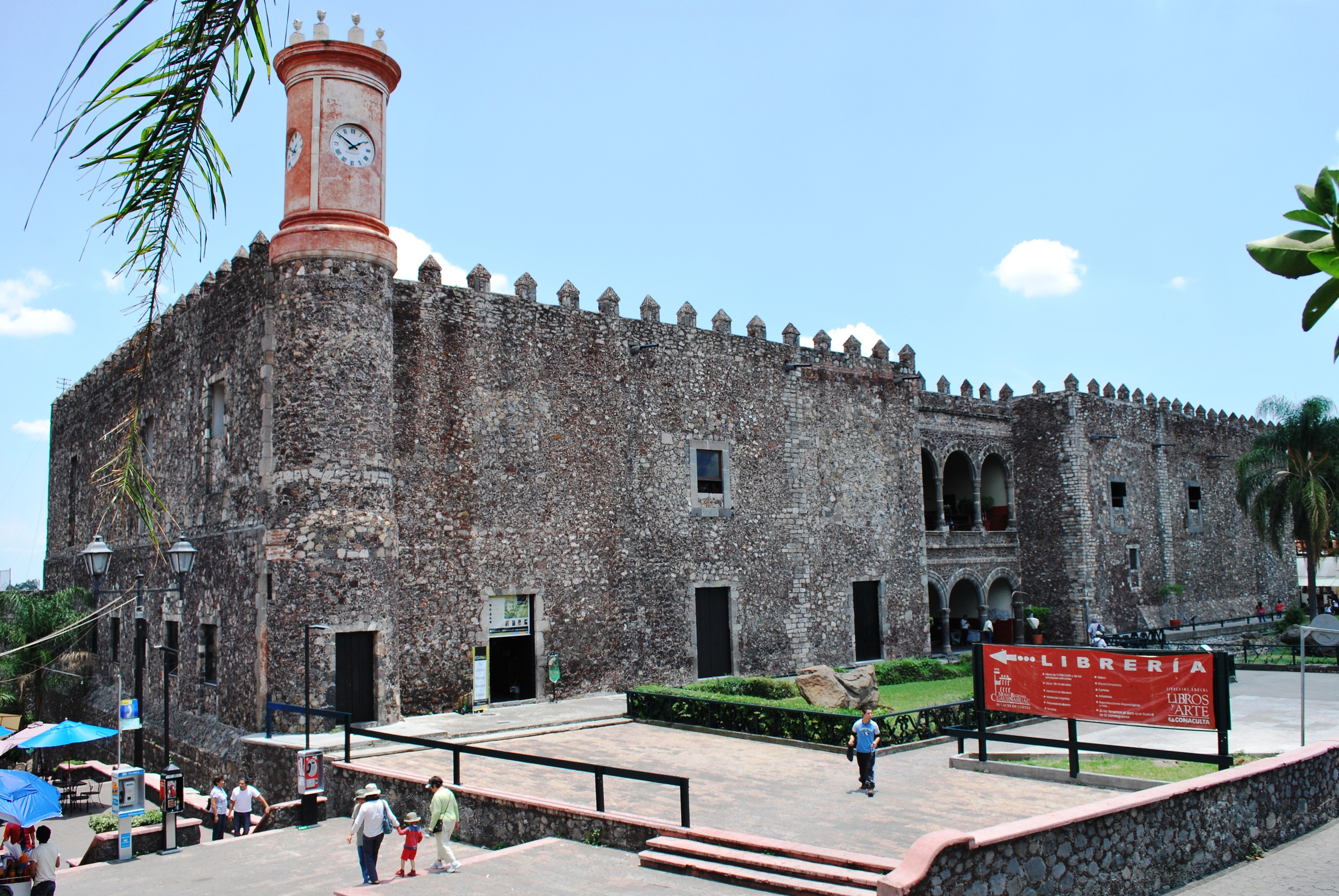
Palace of Cortes

- Museum of the City of Cuernavaca
- El Castillo (Photograph Museum of the City)
- Juarez Museum devoted to President Benito Juarez
- Museo Regional Cuauhnáhuac (Palace of Cortes)
- Museum of Herbal Medicine
- David Alfaro Siqueiros Home and Workshop
- Brady Museum (private art collection)
- Museo y Centro de Documentación Histórica Ex Convento de Tepoztlán.
- Museo Histórico del Oriente de Morelos "Casa de Morelos". Museo Local.
- Museo de Sitio de Xochicalco. Sitio arqueológico.
- Jardín Etnobotánico y Museo de Medicina Tradicional y Herbolaria. Museo Local.
- Museo de Sitio de Coatetelco. Sitio arqueológico.

=== Nayarit ===
- Cuatro Pueblos Museum (museum of four cultures: huicholes, coras, tepehuanos and mexicaneros)
- Amado Nervo Museum
- Regional Museum of Anthropology

=== Nuevo León ===
- Museo de Arte Contemporáneo (MARCO) (Contemporany Museum of Art), Monterrey
- Museo de Historia Mexicana, Monterrey
- Museo Metropolitano de Monterrey, Monterrey
- Museo del Palacio de Gobierno, Monterrey
- Museo Palacio del Obispado (Bishopric's Palace Museum), Monterrey
- Museo Arquidiocesano de Arte Sacro, Monterrey
- Museo del Acero Horno 3 (Horno 3 Museum of Steel), Fundidora Park, Monterrey
- Museo del Vidrio, Monterrey
- Museo de Historia del Noreste, Monterrey
- Colegio Civil, Monterrey
- Planetario Alfa (Alfa Planetarium Science Museum), San Pedro Garza García
- Museo del Valle del Pilón, Montemorelos
- Museo Bernabé de las Casas, Mina
- Hacienda San Pedro (Hacienda of San Pedro), General Zuazua
- Papalote museo del niño, Monterrey

=== Oaxaca ===
- Cultural Centre of Oaxaca in the Church of Santo Domingo de Guzmán
- Museo de las Culturas de Oaxaca
- Rufino Tamayo Museum (Museum of Prehispanic Art)
- Museo de Arte Contemporáneo de Oaxaca (Museum of Contemporary Art)
- Museo de los Pintores Oaxaqueños (Museum of Oaxacan Painters)
- Casa de Juárez (Museum of Mexican President Benito Juárez)
- Museo Philatélica de Oaxaca (Stamp Museum)
- Railway Museum of Southern Mexico
- Instituto de Artes Gráficas de Oaxaca
- Museo Estatal de Arte Popular de Oaxaca

=== Puebla ===
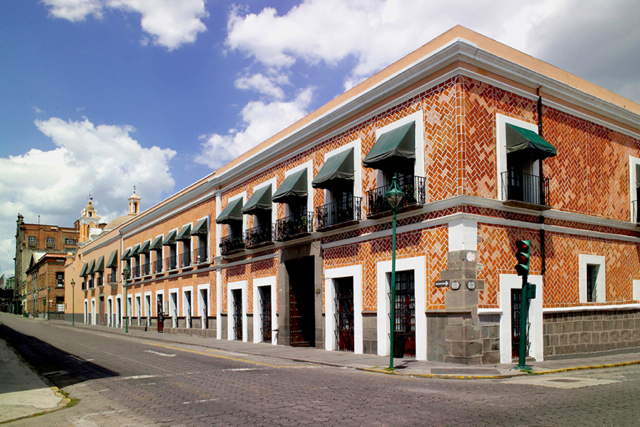
Amparo Museum

- Automobile Museum
- National Museum of Mexican Railroads
- Amparo Museum (Prehispanic, Colonial, Modern and Contemporary Mexican Art)
- Museo Poblano de Arte Virreinal

=== Querétaro ===
- Regional Museum of Querétaro

=== Quintana Roo ===
- Cancún Archaeological Museum
- Museum of Maya Culture
- Museo de la Isla de Cozumel (Cozumel Island Museum)

=== San Luis Potosí ===
- Regional Museum of San Luis

=== Sinaloa ===
- Mazatlán Archaeological Museum

=== Sonora ===
- Museo Regional de Sonora
- Museo de Arte de Sonora (MUSAS)
- Museo de Culturas Populares e Indígenas
- Museo de Minería de Hermosillo
- Museo de la Universidad de Sonora
- Museo Sonora en la Revolución
- Museo de Minería de Hermosillo "Porfirio Padilla"
- Casa de la Cultura de Sonora
- Museo de Vida Silvestre
- La Casa de los Duendes
- Galería de Arte ITSON
- Centro Cultural La Casa de Adobe
- Museo de los Yaquis
- La Casona de Cócorit
- Museo/Hogar Mons. Juan Navarrete y Guerrero
- Antigua Cárcel y Museo de Guaymas
- Casa de la Cultura-Guaymas
- Museo Ferrocarrilero

=== State of Mexico ===
- Museo de Virreinato
- Museum of Fine Arts
- Museum of Modern Art
- Museum of Popular Cultures
- Museum of Natural Sciences
- Museum of Anthropology and History
- Print Museum
- Watercolor Museum
- House of Handcrafts
- Numismatics Museum (the only one in Latin America)
- José Vasconcelos Museum
- Museo Felipe Santiago Gutiérrez
- Luis Nishizawa Workshop Museum
- Teotihuacan Museum
- Manuel Gamio Museum

=== Tabasco ===
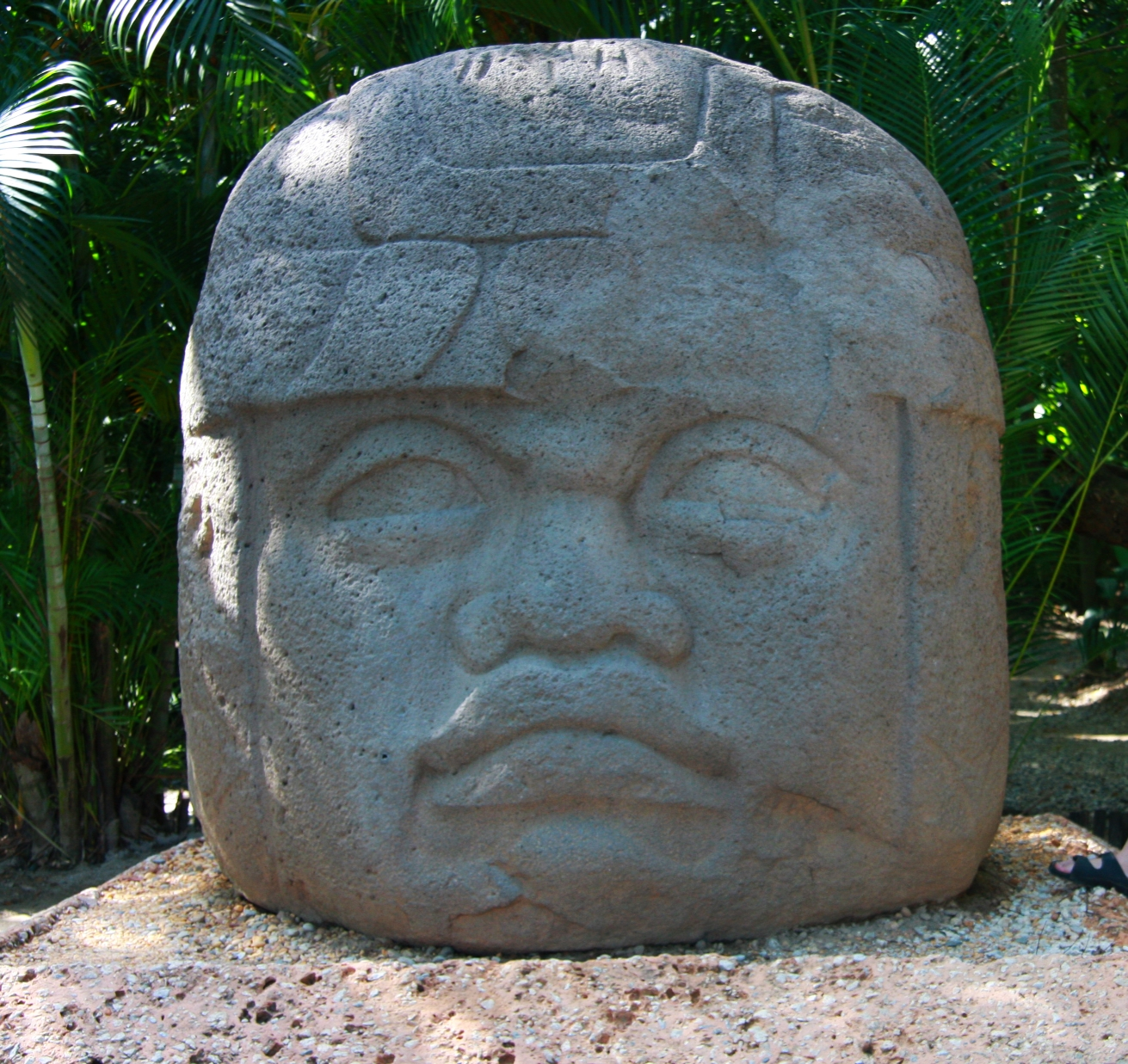
Open-air museum at La Venta

- Planetarium Tabasco (IMAX screen)
- Tabasco Institute of Culture
- Natural History Museum
- Museo de Sitio de Pomoná.
- Museo de Sitio La Venta.
- Museo de Sitio de Comalcalco.
- Museo de Oxolotán.

=== Tamaulipas ===
- Museo del Agrarismo. Matamoros

=== Tlaxcala ===
- Regional Museum of Tlaxcala
- Museo de Sitio de Xochitécatl.
- Museo de Sitio de Cacaxtla.
- Museo de Sitio de Ocotelulco.
- Museo de Sitio de Tizatlán.

=== Veracruz ===
- Xalapa Museum of Anthropology
- Museo Interactivo de Xalapa (IMAX screen)
- Hacienda del Lencero
- Pinacoteca Diego Rivera
- Jardín de Esculturas
- Museo Casa Xalapa (Museum of the city of Xalapa)
- Museo del Fuerte De San Juan de Ulua
- Veracruz Wax Museum
- Veracruz Institute of Culture
- The Museum of the City of Veracruz
- Museo del Recinto de la Reforma.
- Museo Histórico Naval (Naval History Museum).
- Casa Principal.
- Museo Baluarte de Santiago.
- Casa Museo Salvador Díaz Mirón.
- Archivo y Galería del Arte.
- Museum of the Mexican Revolution.
- Oil Museum
- Archaeological Museum of Córdoba
- Museum of the City of Córdoba
- National Museum of Fantastic Art
- Museum of Veracruz Fauna
- Museum of Orizaba Art
- Marine Museum of Tecolutla
- Museum of the State of Veracruz Art Felipe Neri
- Yanga Museum; dedicated to Gaspar Yanga who has the first successful slave revolt in the Americas
- Museum of the Old Train Station
- Museo Fotográfico de Nanchital (Photography Museum of Nanchital)
- Agustín Lara Museum
- Tuxteco Museum
- Jarocho Museum
- Museum of Tajín (UNESCO World Heritage Site)
- Museo Baluarte de Santiago
- Museo el Zapotal
- Museo de Cempoala
- Museo de Sitio San Lorenzo
- Museo de Sitio Tres Zapotes
- Museo de Sitio de Higueras
- Museo de Sitio de la Matamba
- Community Museum of Atoyac
- Community Museum of Coscomatepec
- Community Museum of Emiliano Zapata
- Community Museum of Jalcomulco
- Community Museum of Jamapa
- Community Museum David Ramírez Lavoignet
- Community Museum of Acamalín
- Community Museum Paseo del Correo
- Community Museum Serafín Olarte
- Community Museum el Jonotal
- Community Museum of Tenochtitlán

=== Yucatán ===
- Museo de Historia Natural
- Museo de Arte Contemporáneo Ateneo de Yucatán (MACAY)
- Museo de la Canción Yucateca Asociación Civil
- Museo de Arte Popular
- Museo de la Ciudad de Mérida
- Museo de Antropología e Historia "Palacio Cantón"(Anthropology and History Museum)
- Palacio de Musica

=== Zacatecas ===
- Museo Manuel Felguérez
- Museo de Sitio de la zona arqueológica Alta Vista – Chalchihuites
- Museo de La Quemada
- Museo de Guadalupe
- Museo Rafael Coronel
- Museo Pedro Coronel
- Museo Zacatecano

== See also ==
- List of archives in Mexico
