= Archivo Nacional de la República de Cuba =

- 23.1293°N 82.3519°W
- Location: Havana, Cuba
- Established: 1840

Other information
- Website: www.arnac.cu/en/

The Archivo Nacional de la República de Cuba is the national archive of Cuba. Founded in 1840, it is located in Havana on Calle Compostela. Directors have included Vidal Morales y Morales and Joaquín Llaverías Martínez.

== Collections ==
As of 1995, the archives includes several distinct collections of records, such as:

- Administracion General Terrestre
- Archivo Calixto Garcia Iniguez
- Archivo Emeterio S. Santovenia
- Archivo Grafico
- Archivo Maximo Gomez
- Archivo Valle Iznaga
- Asuntos Politicos
- Audiencia de La Habana
- Audiencia de Santiago de Cuba
- Audiencia de Santo Domingo
- Banco Nacional de Cuba
- Bienes del Estado
- Comision Militar
- Consejo de Administracion
- Correspondencia de los Capitanes Generales
- Escribanias
- Las Floridas
- Fondo Adquisiciones
- Fondo Donative y Remisiones
- Fondo Especial
- Indendencia General de Hacienda
- Instruccion Publica
- Licencias para Fabricas
- Ordenacion General de Pagos
- Presidios y Carceles
- Real Consulado y Junto de Fomento
- Realengos
- Reales Ordenes y Cedulas
- Secretaria de Agricultura
- Secretaria del Archivo Nacional

== See also ==
- List of archives in Cuba
- List of national archives

== Bibliography ==
Issued by the Archives

- Boletín del Archivo Nacional (in Spanish), Habana, 1904 – via HathiTrust. 1902- . (Some issues fulltext). + Current issues Archived 2016-10-13 at the Wayback Machine

About the Archives

- Roscoe R. Hill (1947). "Capitán Joaquín Llaverías and the 'Boletín del Archivo National'". American Archivist. 10 (4): 323–327. doi:10.17723/aarc.10.4.37731071523v2132.
- Louis A. Pérez (1995). Essays on Cuban History: Historiography and Research. University Press of Florida. ISBN 978-0-8130-1329-9 – via Google Books.
- Louis A. Pérez; Rebecca Jarvis Scott, eds. (2003). The Archives of Cuba: Los Archivos de Cuba (in Spanish). University of Pittsburgh Press. ISBN 0822941953. (fulltext)
- Vanessa Oliveira; Xavier Calmettes, eds. (2016). "Guide du chercheur américaniste: Enquête de terrain et travail de recherche à Cuba" [Americanist Researcher's Guide: Survey of Cuba]. Nuevo Mundo, Mundos Nuevos (in French). doi:10.4000/nuevomundo.69135. ISSN 1626-0252.
