= List of archives in Cuba =

This is list of archives in Cuba.

== Archives in Cuba ==
- Archivo Nacional de la República de Cuba in Havana
- Archivo Histórico Provincial de Camagüey
- Archivo Histórico Provincial de Cienfuegos
- Archivo Histórico Provincial de Holguín
- Archivo Histórico Provincial de Las Tunas
- Archivo Histórico Provincial de Matanzas
- Archivo Histórico Provincial de Pinar del Río
- Archivo Histórico Provincial de Sancti Spíritus
- Archivo Histórico Provincial de Villa Clara
- Instituto de Historia de Cuba in Havana
- Biblioteca Nacional Jose Marti Colecciones Especiales in Havana

== See also ==
- List of libraries in Cuba
- List of museums in Cuba
- Culture of Cuba
- Portal de Archivos Españoles (federated search of archives in Spain)
