= National Library José Martí =

Library in Cuba

The National Library José Martí (Spanish: Biblioteca Nacional José Martí) is the national library of Cuba. It is located in Havana and named after the national hero José Martí. This library was established on October 18, 1901. BNJM is a partner in the Digital Library of the Caribbean, contributing digitized materials to share with the world as Open Access. Information about the extensive holdings are available through WorldCat. Its current headquarters was built between 1952 and 1957. It has more than 4 million printed copies.

== See also ==
- List of national libraries
- List of libraries in Cuba
