= List of archives in Mexico =

This is list of archives in Mexico.

== Archives in Mexico ==
- Archivo Casasola
- Archivo Electrónico Ricardo Flores Magón
- Archivo General de la Nación, Mexico City
- Archivo Histórico de la Ciudad de México
- Archivo Histórico del Distrito Federal
- Archivo Histórico del Instituto Nacional de Arqueología e Historia
- Archivo Histórico de Notarías
- Archivo de Instrumentos Públicos, Guadalajara
- Biblioteca Pública del Estado de Jalisco
- Archivo del Arzobispado de Guadalajara
- Archivo Histórico de la Provincia Franciscana, Zapopan
- Carso Center for the Study of Mexican History
- Archivo General de Notarías del Estado de Jalisco, Toluca
- Repositorio de la Facultad de Filosofía y Letras de la UNAM
- Repositorio Nacional de Acceso Abierto a Recursos de Información Académica, Científica, Tecnológica y de Innovación (Mexico)

== See also ==
- List of libraries in Mexico
- List of museums in Mexico
- Culture of Mexico
- Portal de Archivos Españoles (federated search of archives in Spain)
