= History of libraries in Latin America =

The history of libraries in Latin America dates back to before the conquest of the continent by the Spanish. Although the indigenous peoples of Mexico, Central America, and South America had developed a written language and, in some cases, created libraries and record depositories of their own, library history of the continent tends to focus on post-conquest institutions. This article will discuss the history of libraries in Latin America.

== Mexico and Central America ==
=== Pre-Conquest ===
The Aztecs, Maya, Mixtec, Olmec, Purépecha, and Zapotecs had all developed written language prior to the Spanish Conquest. Although numerous cultures in the region had developed writing systems, only the Maya had developed a phonetic language. Although numerous types of writing surfaces were used, such as stone, bone, metal, and ceramics, the most famous surviving artifacts are the codices. As in other regions, codices were made from long strips of material folded into an accordion shape; in this region, bark from the amate tree, agave fibers, and/or animal hides were used as paper, and the codices were protected by wooden covers. The Nahuatl codices (containing works from the Aztecs, Maya, and Mixtecs, among other tribes in the Nahua language family), are the most famous of these. Codices were used to record a variety of types of information, including astronomical knowledge, religious calendars, genealogies of the ruling families, cartography, and tribute collection. Temples and schools were the first "libraries" in the region, as this is where the codices were stored and used as educational materials.

=== Maya Libraries ===
Maya writing can be dated as far back as 400 BCE. During the Golden Period of Maya Civilization also called the Classic Period (250–900 CE), the Maya were believed to have large libraries filled with books. Most surviving Maya writing exists on stone structures or other durable surfaces but historians believe that the majority of Maya writing would have been done on paper. By the end of the Maya Classic Period it is assumed that Maya libraries housed thousands of books, written on bark paper or deer skin. These libraries contained codices that covered important subjects such as genealogy, astronomy, rituals, information about plants and animals, medical knowledge, and history.

=== Aztec/Mexica' Records ===
It was said that the Aztec city of Tenochtitlan, had become such "a splendid city that, according to records, it dazzled the Spaniards." The Aztecs had an advanced prosperous civilization. Though it is speculated that the Aztecs had libraries, not much is known about where the Aztecs actually kept their records. Conquistador and eyewitness Bernal Diaz mentions seeing a "whole house filled with large books" in Tenochtitlan. There was also mention of a library that belonged to Netzahualcoyotl in Tetzcoco with books from other Mesoamerican civilizations and one in Xochimilco. Through surviving codices and accounts from Spaniards, it is known that the Aztec, kept records on facets of life, including events, genealogical histories, practices, math, land ownership, maps, and civil and criminal laws. In fact, at the time of the conquest, the Aztecs had just begun to codify their [customary] laws into a more formal written form." The Aztecs collected information in the form of glyphs or picture and images on books (called amoxtli in the Nahuatl language). The Aztec codices, in keeping with other Mesoamerica codices, were folded into 'screenfold' style and bound so that readers could view many pages at once. The bound books were made from deer hide and agave plants. Though there is not much to share about where exactly the Aztec kept their books, whether it was in one large library or several storage areas, "hundreds of indigenous books were in use in Mesoamerica" before the arrival of conquistadors.

=== Post-Conquest to 1600 ===
The Spanish arrival meant that preexisting Mesoamerican books and libraries were destroyed by conquistadores and missionaries. Only 15 codices survived after 1521; these include the Borgia codex, the Vatican B codex, and the Tro-Cortesiano codex. However, codices were slow to die out; Spanish-language, bilingual, and indigenous-language codices continued to be produced, with the list of materials changing to include paper and the subjects focusing on the Christian religion and tribute to colonial administrators. One such example is the Codex Mendoza; it contains ethnography of the Aztecs with a commentary by Spanish priests and was created in 1541 as a gift for Charles V of Spain. The first Mexican printing press was established in 1539 by Juan Pablos The first book published in the Western hemisphere was Doctrina breve, written by Juan de Zumárraga, the first archbishop of Mexico. It was printed in Tenochtitlan, what is called Mexico City today, in 1539. Due to the lack of widespread Spanish literacy, most printed items were stored in the library of the university of Mexico City or in the private libraries of clergy, noblemen, and government officials. In 1646 the oldest public library in Americas, Biblioteca Palafoxiana, was established in the Mexican state of Puebla. Born in 1648, Sor Juana Inés de la Cruz was one of the intellectuals of Mexico during the late 17th century. The Carmelite nun used a 4,000-volume library established by her grandfather to further her education; she corresponded with Sir Isaac Newton and was also renowned for her skill in poetry. Unfortunately, Sor Juana became embroiled in a battle with Church politics in 1690; although she passionately defended the right of women to an education, she was banned from writing and her library in 1691, dying four years later.

== South America ==
=== The Andes ===
==== Pre-Conquest ====
The Inca Empire had developed a complex system of knots, called Quipu, used to record information; whether this could be considered a writing system, and collections of quipu libraries, is debated.

==== Post-Conquest ====
As with Mexico and Central America, printing was slow to arrive to the Andes. Quito, Ecuador, obtained its first Spanish press in 1760. As with the other colonies in Mexico and Central America, many printed materials found their way to the library of the University of Lima.

=== Brazil ===
==== Post-Conquest ====
Prior to the mid-18th century, printing was strictly prohibited in Brazil due to its status as an agricultural colony.

The Biblioteca Nacional do Brasil was founded in 1810 by the Portuguese royal family; the collection was left behind in the country following the terms of the treaty that allowed the royal family's return. The library is one of the largest in the Americas, with over 9 million items in the collection. The Biblioteca Nacional organized the first classes in library science in South America and pioneered modernization.

== See also ==
- Libraries in Honduras
- List of libraries in Belize
- List of libraries in Brazil
- List of libraries in Cuba
- List of libraries in Mexico
- List of libraries in Venezuela
