= List of libraries in Azerbaijan =

This is a list of libraries in Azerbaijan.

- ANAS Central Library of Science
- National Library of Azerbaijan
- Library of Milli Majlis of the Republic of Azerbaijan
- Central Library named after Samad Vurgun of Barda region
- Republican Youth Library named after J. Jabbarly
- Republican Children's Library named after F. Kocharli
- Sabir Central City Library
- Nakhchivan Autonomous Republic Library
- Library of the Institute of Literature named after Nizami
- Republican Scientific-Technical Library
- Republican Disabled by Eye Library

== See also ==
- Libraries in Azerbaijan
- Libraries in Baku
- List of museums in Azerbaijan
