= List of libraries in Mexico =

This is a list of libraries in Mexico.

== Libraries in Mexico ==
- Biblioteca Benjamín Franklin
- Biblioteca Central (UNAM)
- Biblioteca central Luis Cabrera
- Biblioteca Daniel Cosío Villegas
- Biblioteca de las Revoluciones de México
- Biblioteca de México José Vasconcelos
- Biblioteca Gonzalo Robles
- Biblioteca Manuel Sandoval Vallarta
- Biblioteca Nacional de Antropología e Historia
- Biblioteca Palafoxiana
- Biblioteca Pública de Santo Tomás Ajusco
- Biblioteca Vasconcelos
- Cervantine Library
- La Ciudadela (Mexico City)
- Francisco Xavier Clavigero Library
- Hemeroteca Nacional de México
- Library of the Congress of Mexico
- Museum of the City of Mexico's Jaime Torres Bodet Library
- National Library of Mexico
- Vicente Fox Center of Studies, Library and Museum

== See also ==
- Library associations in Mexico
  - Asociación Mexicana de Bibliotecarios
- List of archives in Mexico
- List of libraries in Iztapalapa, Mexico City
- List of museums in Mexico
- Mexican literature
- History of libraries in Latin America
- Public libraries in North America, including Mexico
