= List of libraries in the Marshall Islands =

The following is a list of libraries in the Marshall Islands.

- Alele Museum and Public Library
- College of the Marshall Islands library, Uliga campus
- College of the Marshall Islands library, Arrak campus
- University of the South Pacific library, Marshall Islands campus
