= UNAH Library =

Coordinates: 14.08536°N 87.16324°W

- Location: Honduras, Honduras
- Type: Academic library
- Branches: 8

Collection
- Size: 100,000 print volumes

Access and use
- Population served: 60,000

Other information
- Employees: 100
- Website: www.unah.edu.hn

UNAH Library System at Universidad Nacional Autónoma de Honduras, founded in 1968, is a free support for students, teachers and researchers.

== History ==
UNAH Library began as the library for CURN in 1970, but later was renamed UNAH Library. Every campus of UNAH has its own library that forms part of the library system.

== Services and collections ==
In total figures, the Library has more than 100,000 books, 5,000 electronic books and 30,000 paper magazines.

== UNAH libraries in Tegucigalpa ==
The library system of UNAH is composed of three parts:

- Central library in university city campus (Tegucigalpa)
- Small libraries that belong to every faculty
- Medical library in school of medicine

=== Central library ===
The central library is located in the administrative building, at the center of university city in Tegucigalpa, it is composed of six rooms:

- General collection
- Honduran collection
- Reference
- Reserve
- Hemeroteca
- Internet room

Central library is in the same building of learning source center (CRA), which has movies, films, and rooms for presentation and exhibitions.

== See also ==
- Universidad Nacional Autónoma de Honduras
- Oviatt Library
- University College Dublin Library
