= Museo de la Canción Yucateca Asociación Civil =

Music museum in Mérida, Mexico

Coordinates: 20°58′07″N 89°36′54″W

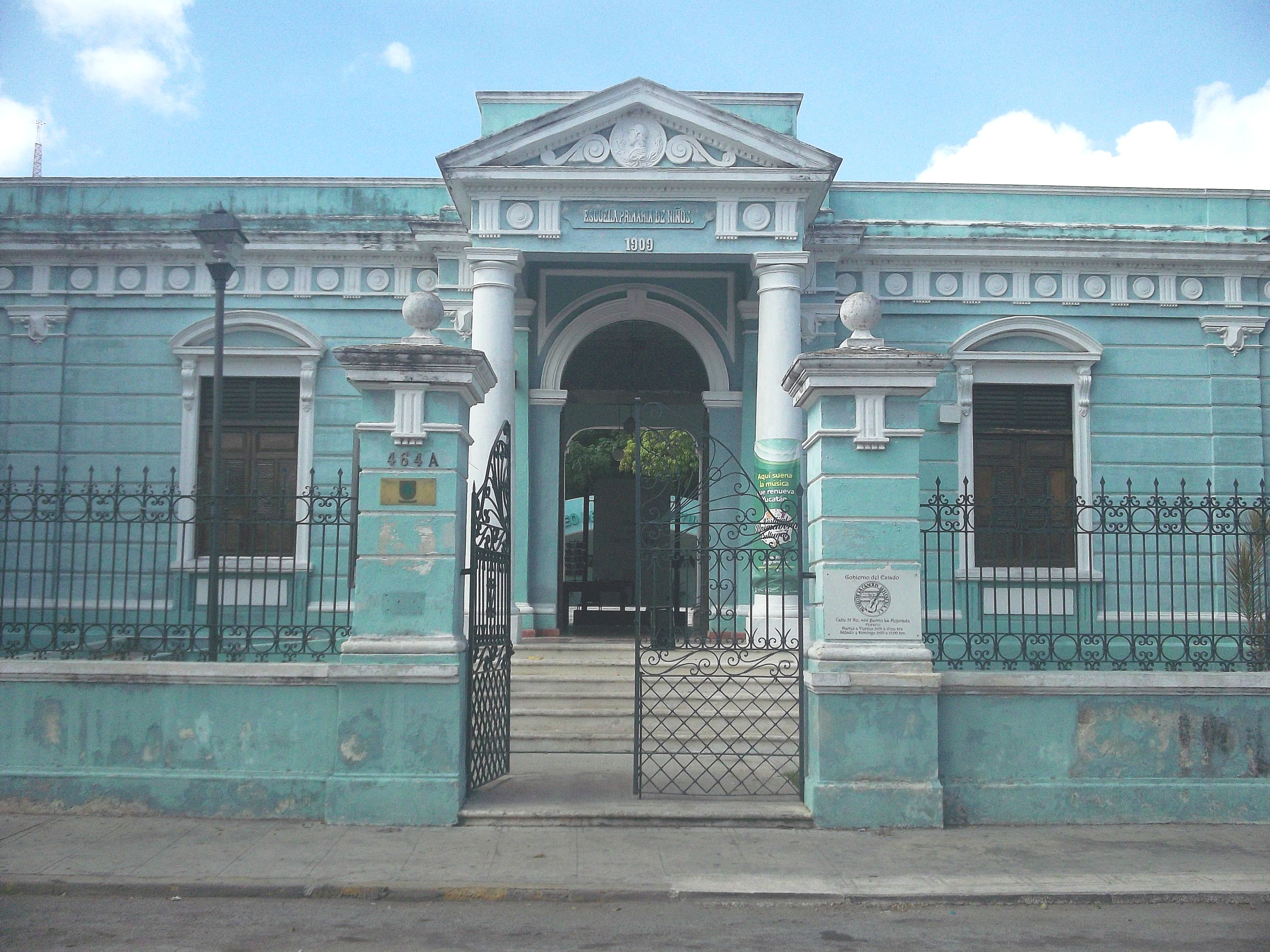
Museo de la Canción Yucateca, Mérida, Yucatán

The Museo de la Canción Yucateca Asociación Civil (Museum of the Yucatecan Song) is a museum located in the city of Mérida, Yucatán, Mexico. Founded in 1978, its mission is to rescue, preserve and promote the characteristic music and cultural background from the Yucatán Peninsula.

The museum was conceived by Mrs. Rosario Cáceres Baqueiro, granddaughter of the creator of "trova yucateca", Cirilo Baqueiro Preve, better known as Chan Cil. It is located in an old colonial style house that was built at the end of the 19th century, in the neighborhood of La Mejorada in the center of the city; the house was donated to the museum in 2001. The building was restored in 2015 at a cost of 20 million pesos. The courtyard has full size statues of singers Pepe Domínguez, Guty Cárdenas and Ricardo Palmerín. There is a theater, and displays include musical instruments, phonographs, musical scores, photographs, paintings, and sculptures.

== See also ==
- List of music museums
