= List of libraries in Australian Capital Territory =

This is a list of libraries in the Australian Capital Territory. As the territory contains Australia's capital city, Canberra (which takes up a significant amount of the territory), the ACT contains many of the libraries which are part of government organisations.

- National Library of Australia, 6,496,772 items held, largest library in Australia.
- Australian Institute of Aboriginal and Torres Strait Islander Studies

== Academic libraries ==
- Pacific Manuscripts Bureau (Australian National University)
- Australian National University Library (Australian National University)
- University of Canberra Library (University of Canberra)
- World Knowledge Centre for Australia
- Basser Library (Australian Academy of Science)

== Public libraries ==
The Australian Capital Territory (ACT) is serviced by Libraries ACT, which has 10 branches:

- ACT Heritage Library
- Belconnen Library
- Civic Library
- Dickson Library
- Erindale Library
- Gungahlin Library
- Kingston Library
- Kippax Library
- Tuggeranong Library
- Woden Library

== Special libraries ==
=== GLAM libraries ===
- National Gallery of Australia Research Library and Archives
- National Portrait Gallery Research Library
- National Museum of Australia Research Library

=== Legal libraries ===
- ACT Legislative Assembly Library
- Parliamentary Library of Australia

=== Archive libraries ===
- National Centre for Australian Children's Literature

== See also ==
- Mechanics' institutes of Australia
