= List of libraries in Tuvalu =

The following is a list of libraries in Tuvalu.

- Tuvalu National Library and Archives.
- University of the South Pacific Library, Tuvalu Campus.
