= List of libraries in Northern Territory =

This is a list of libraries in the Northern Territory.

- Northern Territory Library
- Library & Archives NT

== Academic Libraries ==
- Charles Darwin University Casuarina Campus Library (Charles Darwin University)
- Nungalinya College Library (Nungalinya College)
- Batchelor Institute Library (Batchelor Institute of Indigenous Tertiary Education)

== Public libraries ==
- Alice Springs Public Library (Alice Springs)
- Adelaide River Library (Coomalie)
- Anmatjere Library (Central Desert)
- Alyangula Community Library
- Angurugu Library (Arnem Land)
- City of Darwin Libraries (Darwin)
- Galiwin’ku (Arnem Land)
- Jabiru Public Library (Arnem Land)
- Katherine Public Library (Katherine)
- Lajamanu Learning Centre (Central Desert)
- Mataranka Library (Roper Gulf)
- Milikapiti Library (Milikapiti)
- Milingimbi Library (Arnem Land)
- Ngukurr (Roper Gulf)
- Nhulunbuy (Arnem Land)
- Palmerstone Library (Palmerstone)
- Pine Creek Library (Pine Creek)
- Taminmin Community Library (Litchfield)
- Tennant Creek Public Library (Barkley)
- Ramingining Library (Arnem Land)
- Umbakumba libraries (Arnem Land)

== See also ==
- Mechanics' institutes of Australia
