= Library of the Congress of Mexico =

Library in Mexico City, Mexico

Coordinates: 19°26′7.89″N 99°8′16.52″W

- Biblioteca del Honorable Congreso de la Unión
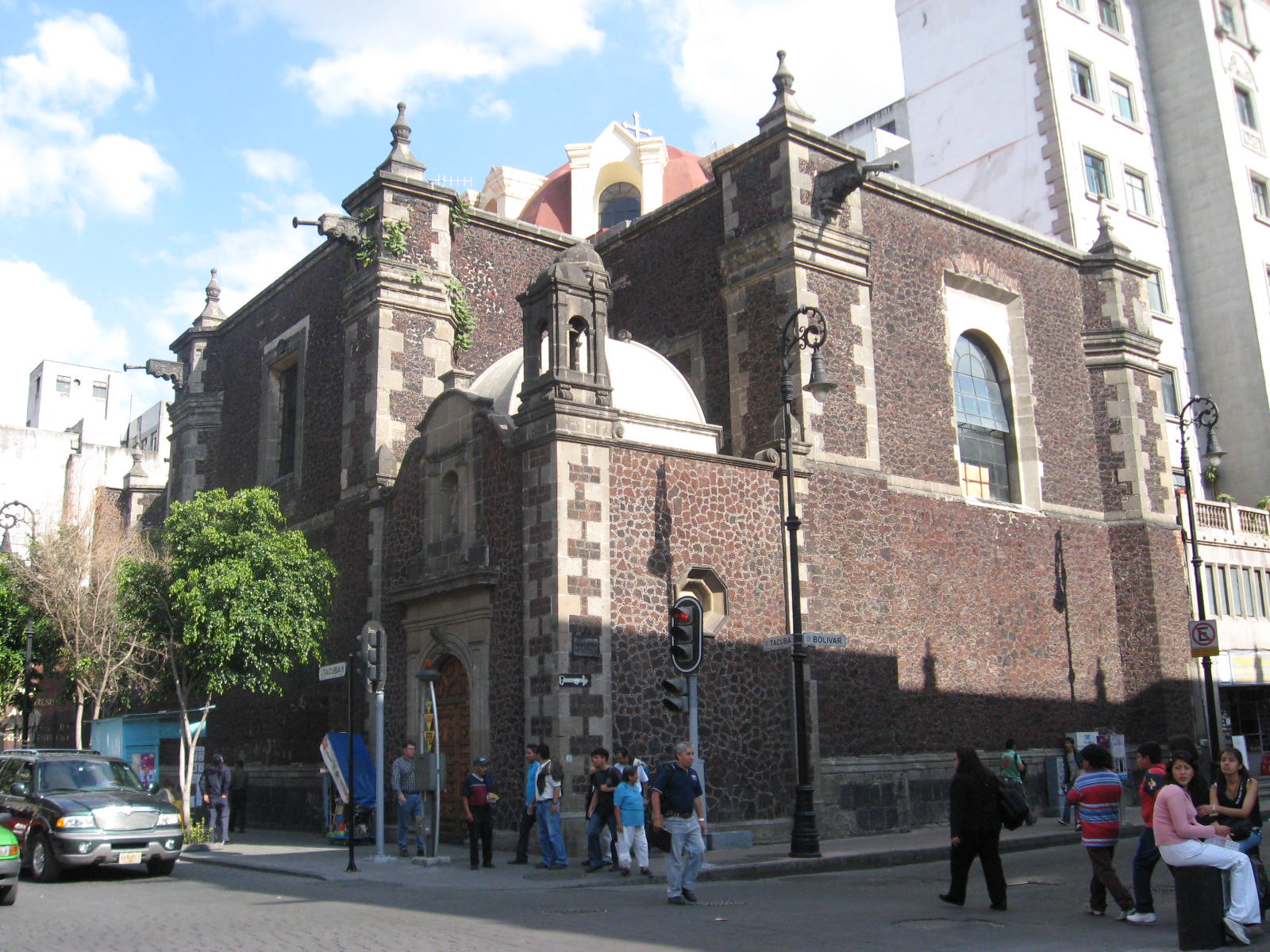
- View of the library
- Location: Historic center of Mexico City, Mexico City, Mexico
- Type: Public library
- Established: 1936; 90 years ago

Other information
- Website: bibliotecas.diputados.gob.mx

The Library of the Congress of Mexico (Spanish: Biblioteca del Honorable Congreso de la Unión) is a public library which contains most of the records of the country's legislative sessions since its Independence. It is located at 29 Tacuba Street, near the corner with Bolivar in the historic center of Mexico City. This structure was originally part of a Poor Clares convent founded in the 16th century, but was confiscated by the Reform Laws of the 19th century. Since then, this building has been used as government offices, barracks and even a canteen. It current use was established in 1936, when the Library of Congress was founded by the Mexican government. Since then, the archives it houses have outgrown the building and a number are housed at the Palacio Legislativo de San Lázaro as well.

== Poor Clare convent ==
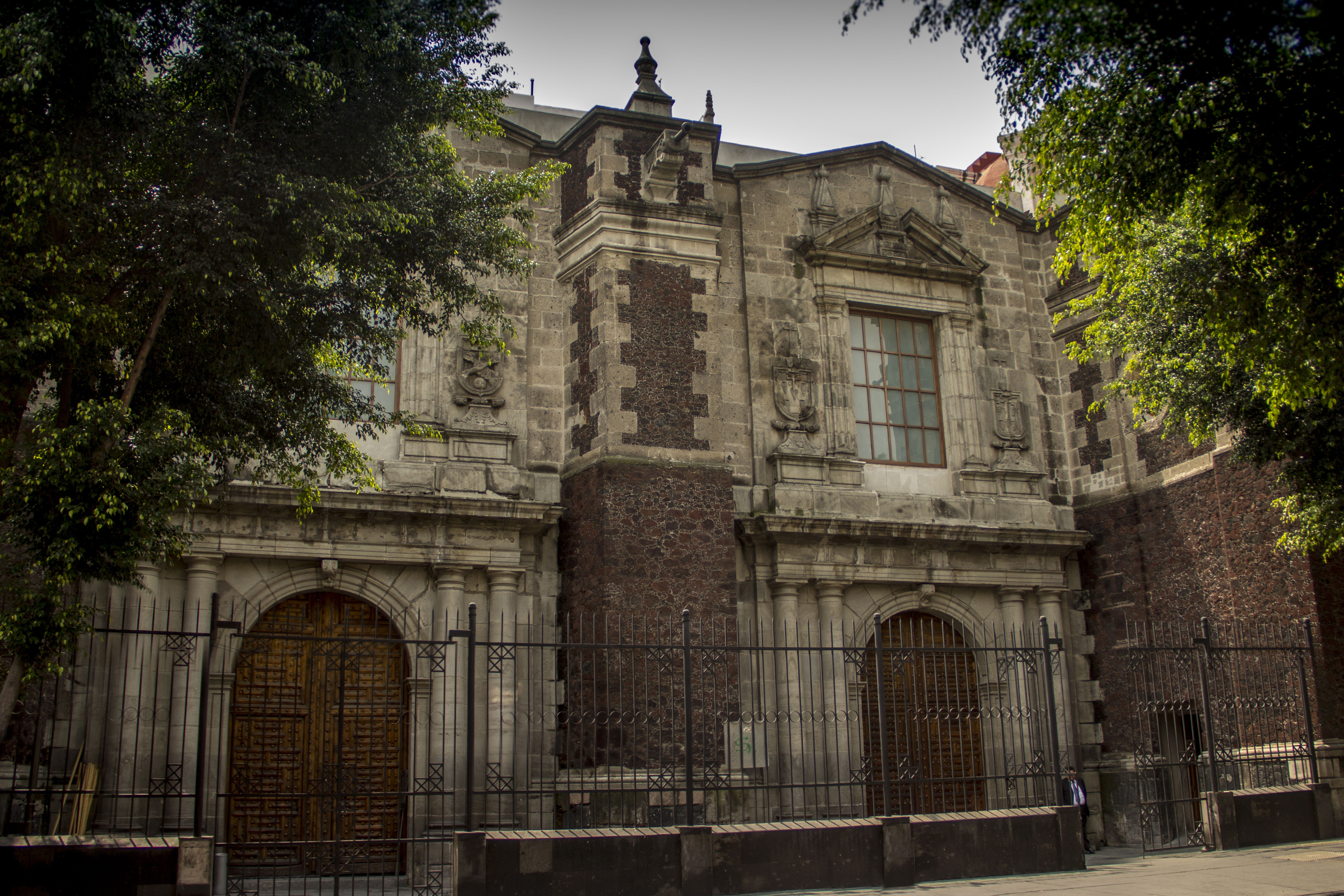
Facade

The land in this area was donated in 1568 by the Antonio Sanchez family for the construction of a convent. The convent was constructed for an order of Poor Clare nuns and the institution began with six members. The first church was finished in 1661. It was classified as part of the Baroque architectural movement but very austere, nearly Herrerian. In 1677, a fire destroyed this church. It was rebuilt as a public church and named the Purísima Concepción church in 1730. The walls and buttress were made of tezontle. The facade, pilasters, arches, vaults and cupola of sandstone with stairs made of granite. The altars were of marble separated from the rest of the church by ironwork railings.

== The building from the mid 19th to mid 20th centuries ==
During the Reform Laws under Benito Juárez, the convent was shut down and the complex was expropriated in 1859. In 1861, it became the offices of the Dirección de Beneficiencia. Later, it was used as a barracks and an astronomical observatory. The government sold the entire complex in 1882 for 1,300 pesos to Eugenio Folletete, who then sold it to Carlos Rivas. It eventually came into the possession of General Manuel González. By the beginning of the 20th century, the complex had become divided. Part of it came back into government hands and used to store legislative archives. The former church building was sold to Manuel Echeverría, who established a canteen called La Constancia in it in the early years of the century. To adapt the building to this purpose, the bell tower was demolished and a door was opened on the Bolivar Street side.

However, beginning from the Mexican Revolution, nationalism was on the rise and Echeverría was a Spaniard, attracting protests against foreign ownership of the building. These would continue sporadically into the 1930s. The continued pressure finally forced Echeverría to sell the business to Julio R. Lara Sosa in 1953, as there were moves to nationalize the property.

The portion of the complex that belonged to the government from the early 20th century was used to store archives for about 50 years. However, starting in the 1940s, leaks and cracks from age were making major remodeling work necessary. By the 1950s, still nothing had been done and the danger to the archives was getting worse. Many of the archives were moved rather than repairs made because of cost. Another problem was that there was insufficient space to accommodate the students coming in to study the records.

== Establishment of the library ==
By the 1960s, the church building had fallen into disrepair and mostly abandoned. In 1962, it was acquired by the government and rehabilitated along with the part of the ex-convent it already owned to found the Biblioteca del Congreso de la Unión (Library of the Congress of the Union).

This building has 845m2 of space. However, since then, the library’s archives have outgrown the building and auxiliary buildings now house archives as well. Archives are now kept at the Palacio Legislativo de San Lázaro as well. The catalog is still maintained on cards, but a project called “Bibliomex” is converting this to digital format.

== See also ==
- List of colonial churches in Mexico City
- List of libraries in Mexico
