= List of libraries in Belize =

List of Libraries in Belize, Central America

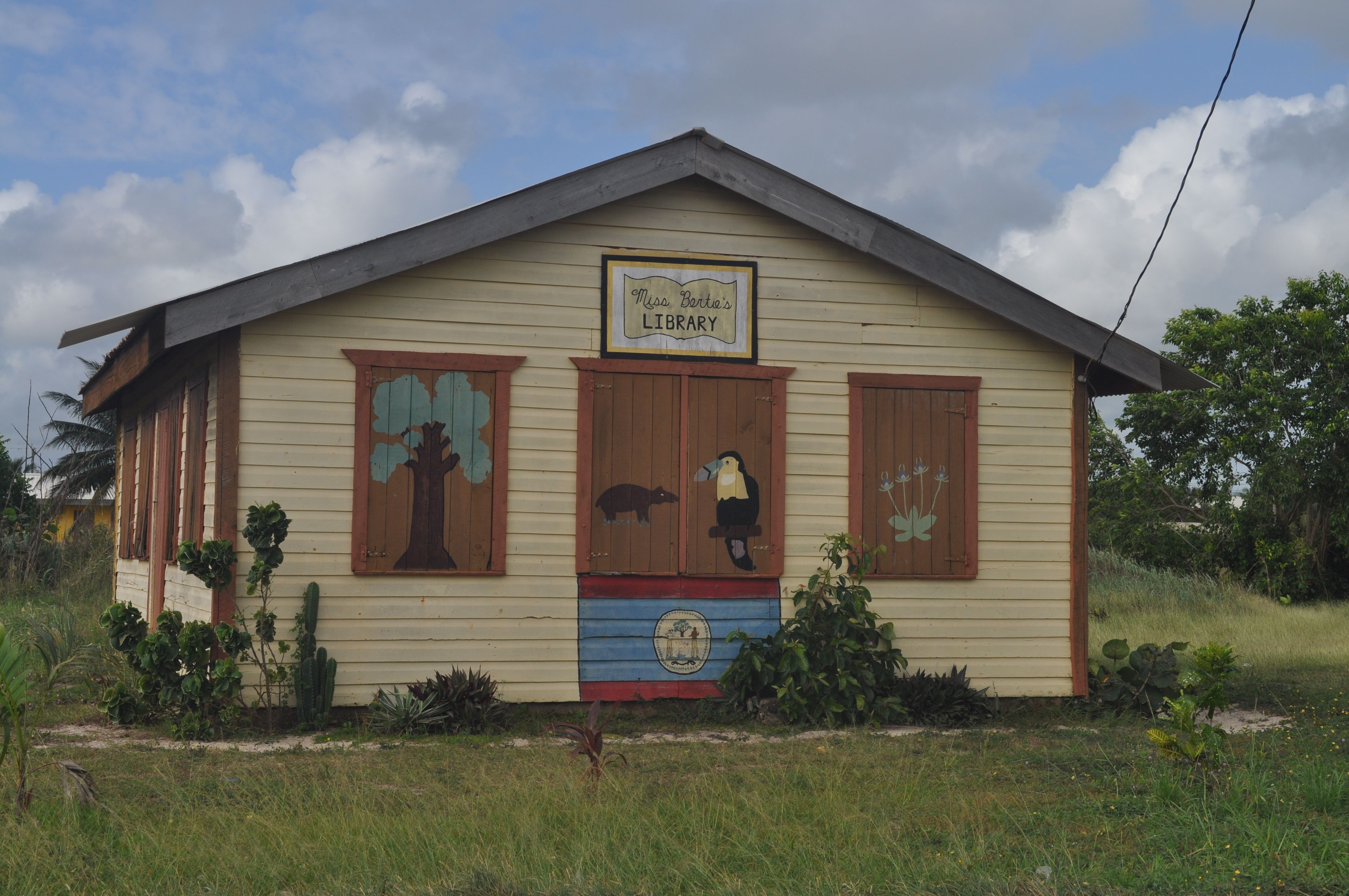
Hobkins Library, Belize

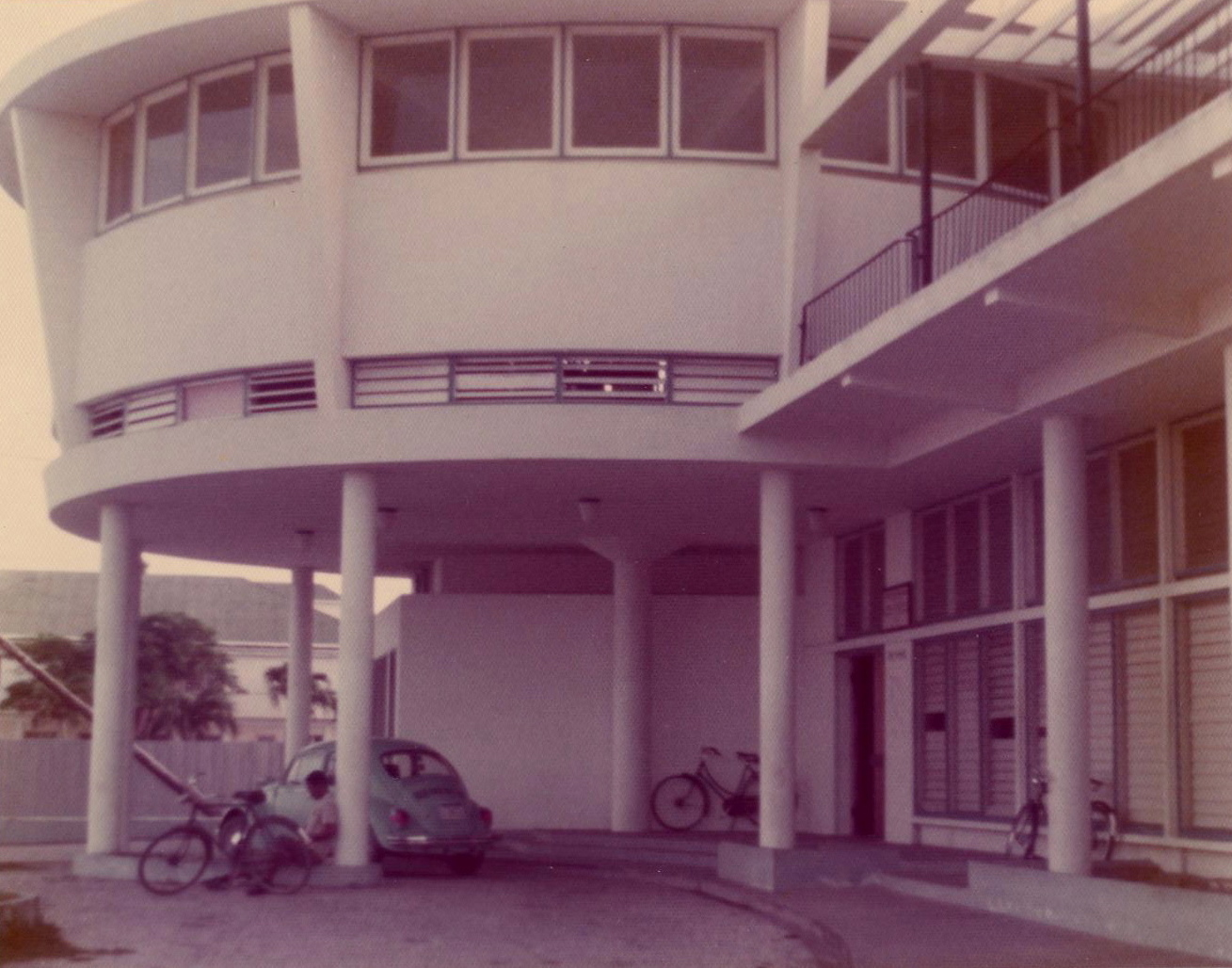
The Bliss Institute

National Library Service of Belize

- The San Pedro Public Library
- National Heritage Library, Belmopan City
- Leo Bradley Library
- Port Loyola Public Library
- Hopkins Library

University of Belize Librarys

- Faculty of Management and Social Sciences, Belize City.
- Punta Gorda Library.
- Faculty of Agriculture at Central Farm
- Main Central Campus Library, Belmopan City.

Belize Law Library of Congress

Supreme Court Law Library

Baron Bliss Institute, Belize City

Coastal Zone Management Authority and Institute Research/Reference Library

Belize ELibrary

Belize Virtual Health Library

Belmopan Public Library

Sarteneja Public Library.

== See also ==
- History of libraries in Latin America
