= Museo de Charrería =

Museum in Mexico City

Coordinates: 19°25′30.08″N 99°8′13.81″W

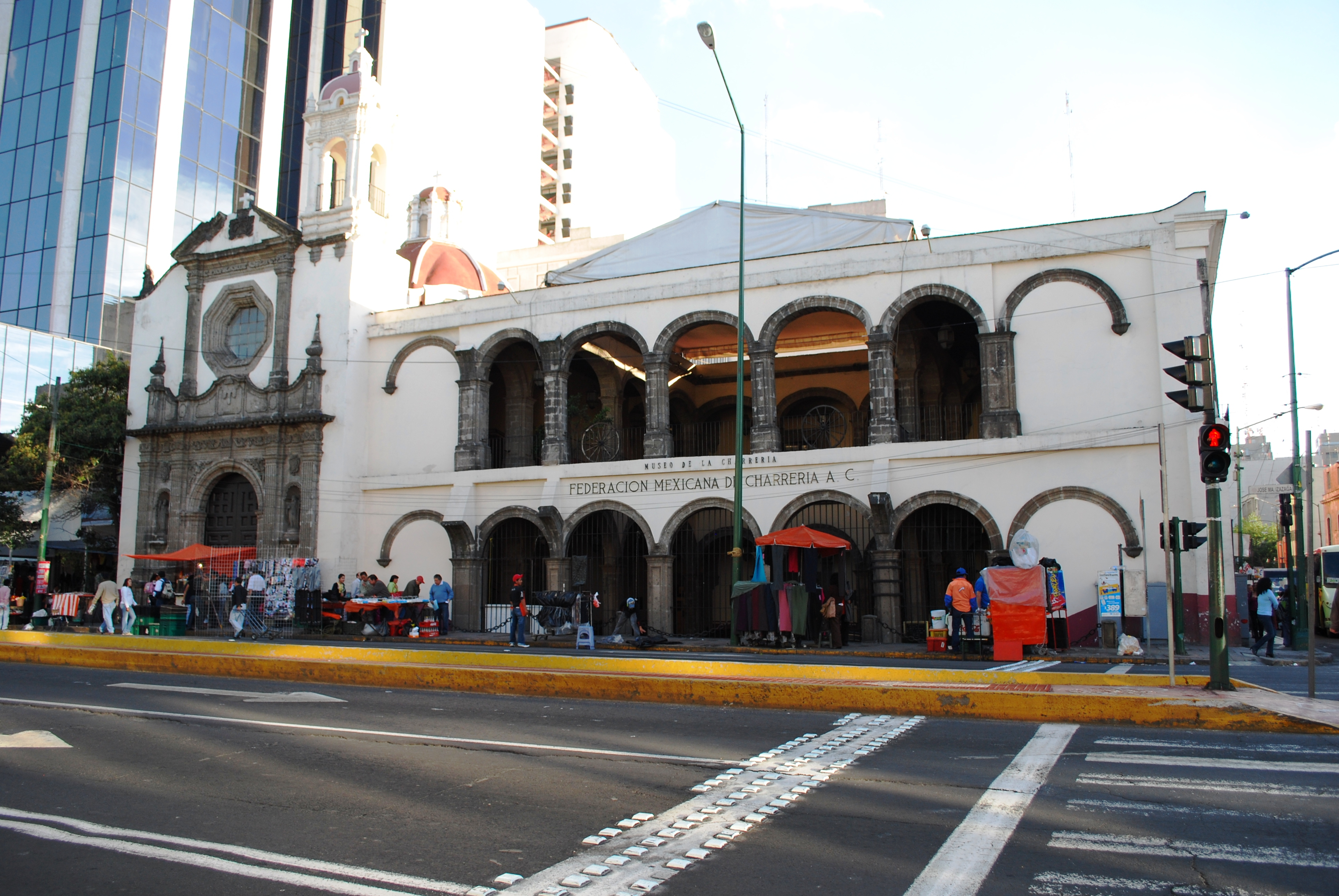
Facade of the museum on Izazaga Street

The Museo de Charrería or Charrería Museum is located in the historic center of Mexico City on Izazaga Street, in an old monastery which was dedicated to the Virgin of Montserrat. The monastery closed in 1821 and the building deteriorated significantly, until it was decided to rehabilitate it as a tourist attraction. The purpose of the museum is to preserve and promote the sport and tradition of the charreada with both the museum's permanent display of art and handicrafts as well as outreach programs.

== The monastery ==
The building is what remains of monastery which was founded in the 16th century, sponsored by Diego Jiménez and Fernando Moreno. It was dedicated to the Virgin of Montserrat, whose image was brought to Mexico City from Catalonia. This image of the Virgin was almost always covered by three veils, which were removed only for principal feast days. Underneath the veils, the image was famous for its extensive array of costumes and jeweled ornaments. Originally, it was a Benedictine monastery. Early in the monastery's history, an epidemic of smallpox converted it into a hospital to attend to thousands of sick natives. The monastery was constantly involved in disputes, and at some point, it became inhabited by the monks of Saint Jerome. These monks were dedicated to the religious education of young people and the copying of manuscripts. Eventually, the disputes forced the monastery to close in 1821 when it had only six monks living in it.

== Between 1821 and 1970 ==
Over the centuries, the building has been a monastery, military quarters, an aeronautics museum, an archive and other uses. Documentation about the building from 1821 to 1930 is scarce, but photographs indicate the facade with the stores the building had before much of it was demolished to widen Izazaga Street. The building was declared a colonial monument in 1931. However, it was also decided to close the building to worship due to the religious conflicts that were going on during that decade (Cristero War). There are indications that in the mid 1930s, the building was used as barracks and later as the headquarters for the Federación Socialista de los Trabajadores (Socialist Federation of Workers). After that, it was used as tenements. However, when the Charreria Federation took possession of the building in 1970, it was completely abandoned. When the tenants were evicted is not known. The building was ceded to a couple of non-profit organizations in the 1960s, but it was not occupied.

== The museum ==
In 1970, it was decided to make the building into a tourist attraction, and it was remodeled at a cost of nearly six million pesos. With work done, the building was ceded to the Federación Nacional de Charros (National Federation of Charros), who converted it into the current museum. It was inaugurated in 1973 and is the only one of its kind in Mexico City. The museum presents arts and crafts related to the sport and tradition such as saddles, lassos, hats, charro suits, firearms and more. Most of the museum pieces have been donated by aficionados of the sport. Some of these items belonged to people such as Maximilian I of Mexico and Francisco Villa. The collection is divided by three historical periods, the colonial area, post-Independence and the Mexican Revolution to the present. There is also a collection of watercolors by José Albarrán Pliego as well as dresses worn by the China Poblana. Since its opening, the collection has continued to grow as the museum receives more donations.

The origin of charrería dates to just after the Conquest. To attend livestock on haciendas, native peoples were trained to ride horses and tend to cattle, leading to a mix of Spanish and indigenous cultures. The principal objective of the museum is to preserve this rich tradition, especially for the Mexican people. The organization also has a permanent program to help schools and craftsmen dedicated to the tradition and the making of items associated with it.

== See also ==
- List of colonial churches in Mexico City
