= List of libraries owned by WildBrain =

This is a list of content libraries and catalogs owned by WildBrain.

== Content libraries ==
- Decode Entertainment library (excluding British rights to Planet Sketch and Chop Socky Chooks, owned by Aardman Animations)
- Halifax Film library
- Cookie Jar Group library
  - CINAR (predecessor)
    - FilmFair
  - DIC Entertainment (excluding some co-productions owned by third-party companies, distribution rights of some content that they didn't produce, as well as some DIC Audiovisuel shows, owned by Disney via BVS Entertainment and other companies)
    - ABC Entertainment/Greengrass Productions (animated productions, excluding Schoolhouse Rock!, retained by Disney)
  - Coliseum Entertainment
- WildBrain Studios
- WildBrain London
  - WildBrain Digital Studios
- Echo Bridge Home Entertainment's family library
  - AAC Kids, except for European distribution, which is handled by Studio 100 International
- Epitome Pictures library
  - Playing With Time, Inc. (predecessor)
- Iconix Brand Group's entertainment library
  - Strawberry Shortcake
- Nerd Corps Entertainment (excluding select co-productions with other companies)
- Ragdoll Worldwide (joint venture with Ragdoll Productions and BBC Worldwide) (excluding the rights to Pob's Programme, owned by Ragdoll itself and Playbox, owned by ITV Studios)
- Studio B Productions (excluding co-productions with other companies)
- Wildbrain Entertainment (original incarnation) (excluding co-productions with other companies)
- Global distribution rights to select Mattel programs
- Global distribution rights to Jay Ward Productions (excluding material produced by Bullwinkle Studios via DreamWorks Animation and/or DreamWorks Classics, owned by Universal Television, and most film adaptations of Jay Ward's properties owned by third-party companies)
- House of Cool Studios

== See also ==
- List of WildBrain programs
