= List of libraries in Cuba =

This is a list of libraries in Cuba. There are more than 400 public libraries in Cuba.

== Libraries in Cuba ==
- National Library José Martí
- Municipal Library Alejo Carpentier
- Municipal Library Antonio José Oviedo
- Municipal Library Camilo Cienfuegos
- Municipal Library Hermanos Saíz
- Municipal Library January 28
- Municipal Library Julio Rosas
- Municipal Library Nena Villegas
- Municipal Library Raúl Gómez García

== See also ==
- Asociación Cubana de Bibliotecarios (in Spanish)
- History of libraries in Latin America
- List of archives in Cuba
- List of museums in Cuba
- Culture of Cuba
