= Libraries in Baku =

The Central Scientific Library of ANAS

Libraries in Baku, the capital of Azerbaijan, are divided into public and private. The first public library in Baku was an Athenaeum library of Nariman Narimanov's, opened with the approval of the Baku Governor Gorchakov in August 1894. The library was shut down in 1896.

== Presidential Library ==
The Presidential library for the Affairs of the President of the Republic of Azerbaijan (azerb. Azərbaycan Respublikası Prezidentinin Işlər Idarəsinin Prezident Kitabxanası) was established in 2003 on the initiative of Heydar Aliyev as a result of the merger of the funds of two city libraries: Central City Library and the Library of General Service Section of the Presidential Administration.

The library received its status for the Affairs of the President of the Republic of Azerbaijan in accordance with the decree of the President of Azerbaijan dated June 22, 2009

== National Library ==
The National Library of Azerbaijan named after M. F. Akhundov (azerb. Azərbaycan Milli Kitabxanası) was established on May 23, 1923. In 1939, the library was named after the Azerbaijani educator Mirza Fatali Akhundov.

In 2005, by Order of the Cabinet of Ministers of Azerbaijan, the library received the status of "National Library".

In the same year, the National Library became a member of the international organization of the Conference of European National Librarians (CENL)".

== Central City Library ==
The Central City Library (azerb. Mirzə Ələkbər Sabir adına Mərkəzi Şəhər Kitabxanası) was opened in March 1919 according to the decision of the Department of culture and education of the Union of Azerbaijani Consumer Society, adopted in 1918.

In 1941, the first bibliographic department was established in the Central City Library.

== Republican Youth Library ==
The Republican Youth Library named after Jafar Jabbarly (azerb. Cəfər Cabbarlı adına Respublika Gənclər Kitabxanası) was founded in 1928.

Since 1937, the library has been called the Jafar Jabbarly Library in honor of the Azerbaijani playwright.

In 1976, the library was granted the status of a Republican Youth Library

== Library for the visually impaired of Azerbaijan ==
Library for the visually impaired of Azerbaijan (azerb. Respublika Gözdənəlillər Kitabxanası) was established in 1981 according to the decree of the Presidium of the Central Administration of the Society of the Blind of the Republic of Azerbaijan dated May 23, 1980, No. 11, an order was issued on the establishment of the Central Library of the Republic.

In January 1994, the library was transferred to the Ministry of Culture of Azerbaijan.

The library is based on books printed in Braille, as well as audiobooks.

== Scientific Library of BSU ==
The Scientific library of Baku State University was opened in 1919 on the initiative of the government of the Azerbaijan Democratic Republic.

According to the order of the Council of People's Commissars, in 1920–1922, books from various departments and organizations were transferred to the library.

In accordance with the resolution of the Ministry of Education of Azerbaijan No. 131 of 1971, the Scientific library of BSU was turned into a scientific and methodological center, the main purpose of which is to regulate the work of libraries of educational institutions of the country.

Since 1998, cooperation has been carried out with the Open Society Institute.

== ANAS Central Library of Science ==
The Central Scientific Library of Azerbaijan National Academy of Sciences was established in 1923 with the support of the “Society for the study and research of Azerbaijan”. The basis for the Scientific Library was the "Bibliographic Bureau", created on November 4, 1923.

In 1925, at the meeting of the Central Council of the "Society for the study and research of Azerbaijan", it was decided to merge the Scientific Library and the Bibliographic Bureau. A Library-Bibliographic Bureau was formed, with Hanafi Zeynally as its Chairman.

In 1963–1984, the Central Scientific Library of ANAS was called the Main Library. Since 1984, the library has been called the Central Scientific Library.

By the decree of the President of Azerbaijan dated January 4, 2003 "On the status of the National Academy of Sciences", paragraph 54 of article 5, the Central Scientific Library received the status of a scientific institution.

In 1993, the Central Scientific Library of ANAS became a member of the International Federation of Library Associations (IFLA).

In 2012, the National library of ANAS became one of the equal members of the Association of Scientific Libraries under the Council of Europe

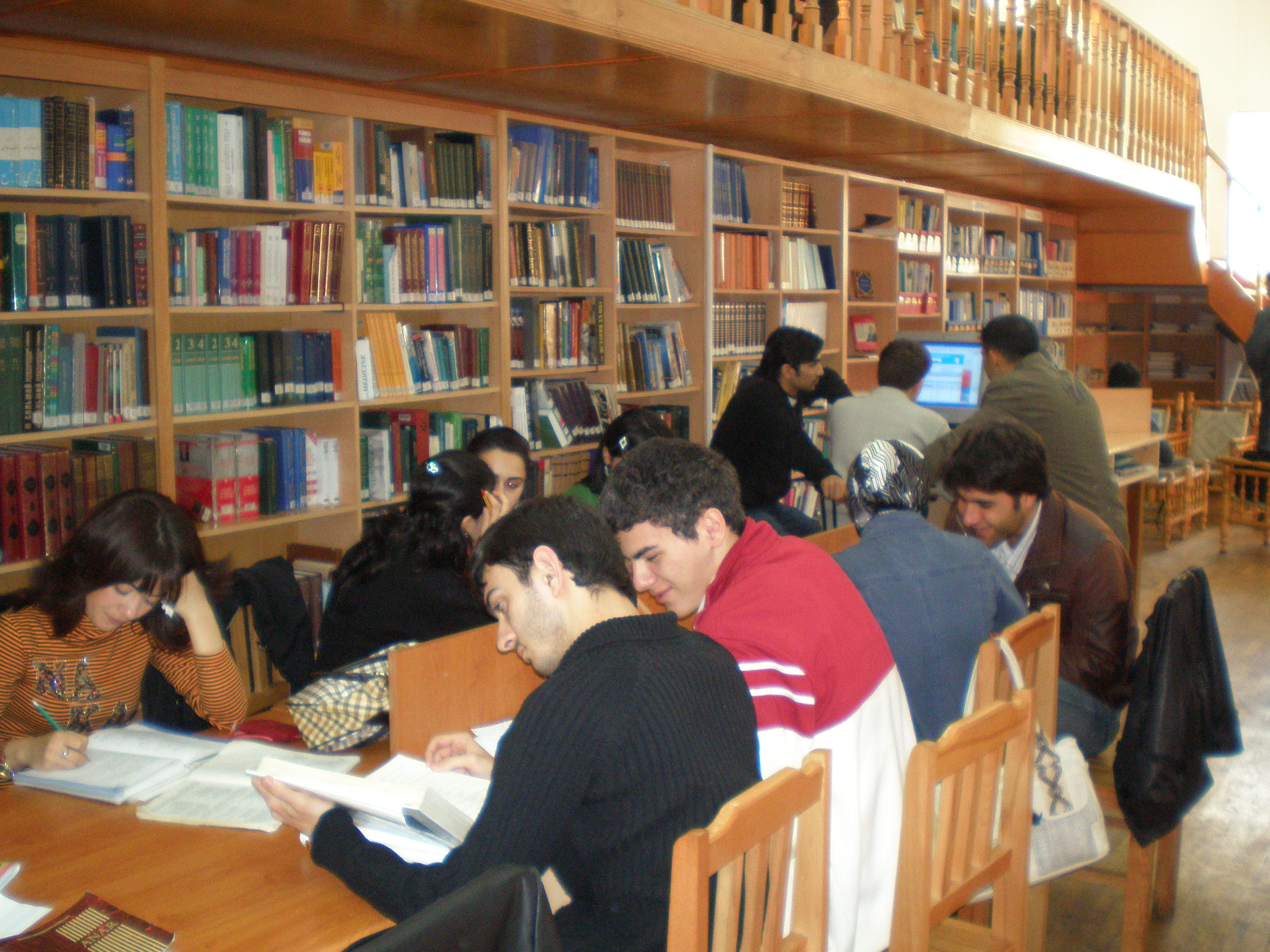
The Khazar University library and information center

== Parliamentary Library ==
The Parliamentary Library of Azerbaijan was established in 1997. The library was founded with the support of the Grand National Assembly of Turkey

In 2000, a coordination center was established for the exchange of official documents, books, etc. between the parliamentary libraries of the CIS countries.

== Library of Khazar University ==
The Khazar University library and information center (KULIC) is the library of Khazar University.

== See also ==
- Libraries in Azerbaijan
- List of libraries in Azerbaijan
