= ANAS Central Library of Science =

Central Scientific Library
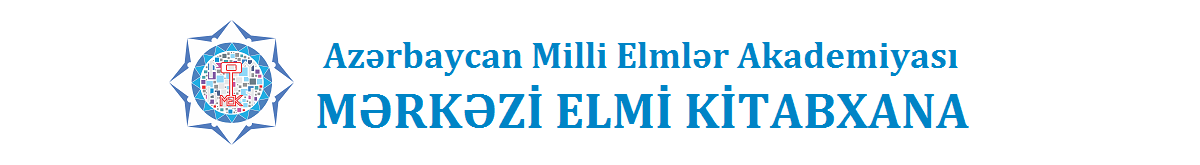
- 40.3745°N 49.8127°E
- Type: scientific
- Established: 1924

Other information
- Director: Huseyn Huseynov
- Website: http://mek.az/default.aspx?lang=en

The ANAS Central Library of Science (Azerbaijan National Academy of Sciences) was founded in 1923 in Baku, Azerbaijan.

== History ==
Central Library Building of Azerbaijan National Academy of Sciences

After the biggest Library in Transcaucasia was shut down in 1920, Baku needed a new library. In November 1923, the ANAS Central Library of Science began as the office of bibliography of the Azerbaijan Society of Research and Investigation (Azərbaycanı Tədqiq və Tətəbbö Cəmiyyəti) or ATTC. It was supported by individuals including Nariman Narimanov, Abdurrahim bey Hagverdiyev, Taghi Shahbazi, and Hanafi Zeynalli. The founding director was Alexander Vasilyevich Baqriyin.

On opening, the library held 430 books and 1200 manuscripts. In August 1925, in order to prevent duplication, the library and the bibliography office became one, the Library-Bibliography Bureau. Hanafi Zeynalli (1896–1938) became the chairman.

Founded in 1925 under the leadership of Hanafi Zeynalli, the Central Scientific Library (CSL) has become one of the largest library and information institutions in the country for 90 years and has played an invaluable role in the development of science and training of scientific personnel. The Central Scientific Library was headed by SM Yahyazade, YITahirov, Nazim Akhundov, Rasim Kazimov, Mahbuba Hasanova, Amin Efendiyev, Aybaniz Aliyeva-Kangarli, Leyla Imanova, Mammad Aliyev in different years. At present, the director of the Central Scientific Library is Huseyn Huseynov.

On January 4, 2003, the president, Heydar Aliyev ratified the 54th item of the Article 5 of the Charter of ANAS, giving the library the status of a scientific institution.

On May 5, 2014, a new library building was opened by the president.

== International relations ==
In 1993, the CSL became a member of the International Federation of Library Associations and Institutions. In 2012, ANAS SCL became a full member of the Association of Scientific Libraries, Council of Europe. The library provides a service for international book exchange. The library invites international guests and ambassadors to visit the library. The library also sends members abroad to study librarianship and attend conferences and exhibitions in other nations.

== Collections ==
The library's collections include works in Azerbaijani language, works in Russian, and works in eastern languages. Georg Hazai's private collection of works in Turkish is housed in the library. Other private collections at the library include those of Y. E. Bertels, Y. A. Belyayev, B. N. Zaxoder, Zahid Huseynzade and gifts of Niyazi and others. There are also books and journals in Western European languages.

The rare book collection is noted for the personal collection of the numismatic scholar, Y. A. Pakhomov and the copies of encyclopaedia sets from many nations. The library holds periodicals and dissertations in hard and electronic copies. Other entities such as the Azerbaijan Society of Petroleum Geologists, the Nakhchivan section of ANAS, and the National History Museum also keep collections in the library.

== Library spaces ==
The library has fourteen reading rooms of various sizes catering for 1,000 visitors, spread through the floors of the library. The Academicians' Hall is a special work area for members of the Academy of Sciences. The Dissertation Hall provides a space for presentation and discussion of papers and proposals, especially those directed to the innovation department of the ANAS. The Zəkalı Discussion Room is a space for discussion among board members, experts, designers, and working groups with technological fittings to assist them. The Conference Hall caters for national and international events, meetings with scientists and writers, anniversaries, conferences, and presentations.
