= List of archives in Germany =

This is list of archives in Germany.

== Archives in Germany ==
- German Federal Archives
- Barbarastollen underground archive
- Bach-Archiv Leipzig
- Bauhaus Archive
- Berlin Document Center
- Deutsche Kinemathek
- Deutsches Filmarchiv
- Deutsches Literaturarchiv Marbach
- Deutsches Tanzarchiv Köln
- Fritz Reuter Literary Archive
- German Broadcasting Archive
- Historical Archive of the City of Cologne
- Königsberg City Archive
- Prussian Privy State Archives
- Staatliches Filmarchiv der DDR
- Stasi Records Agency
- Tomas Schmit Archiv
- List of underground archives, mostly in Germany. Related to new social movements

== Regional archives ==
- Brandenburgisches Landeshauptarchiv

== See also ==
- List of archives
- List of museums in Germany
- Culture of Germany
