= List of libraries in Switzerland =

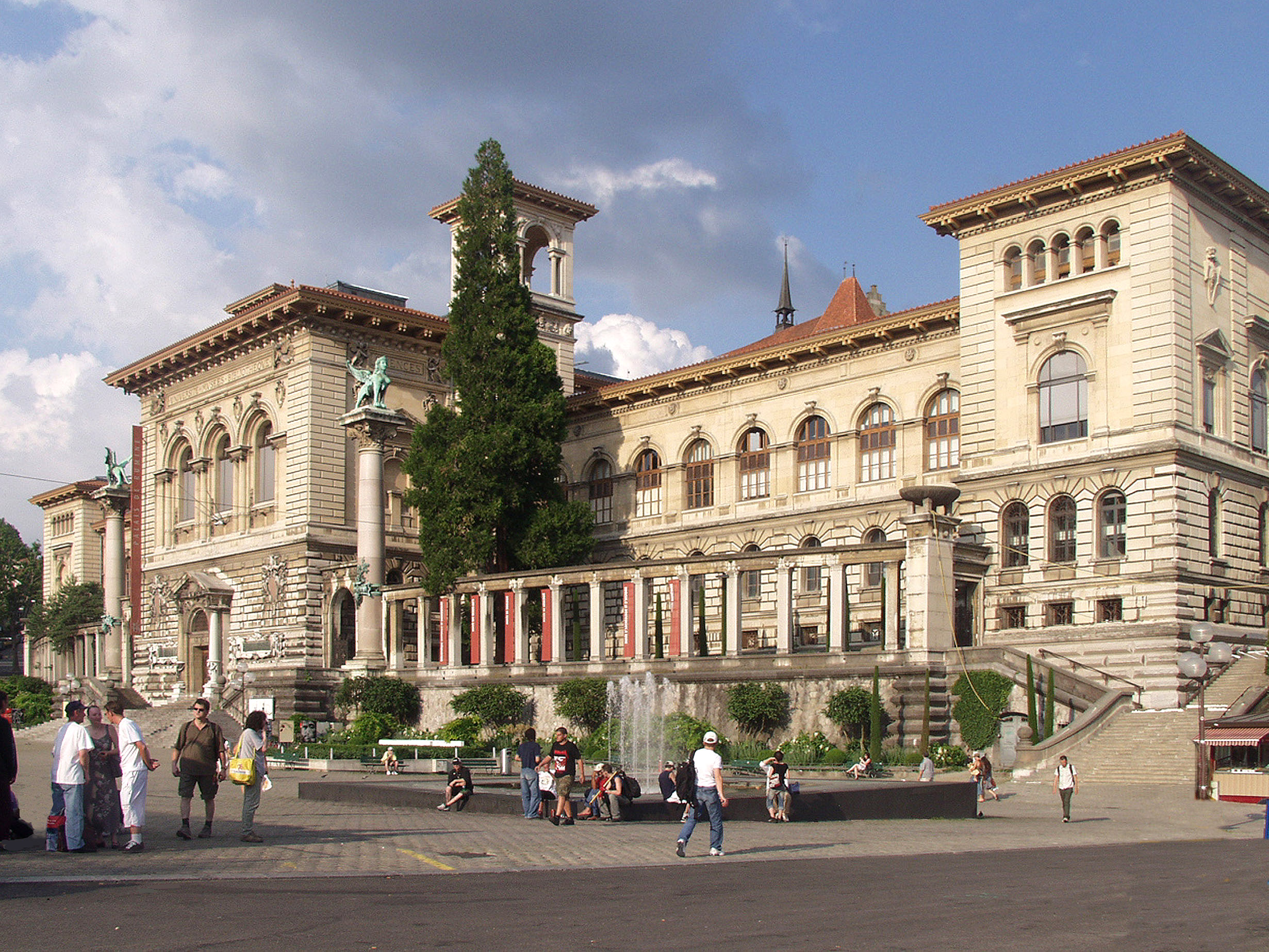
Cantonal and University Library of Lausanne, founded in the 16th century and one of the most important public libraries in Switzerland

This is a list of libraries in Switzerland. The Swiss National Library (at 5.1 million volumes) and Basel University library (at 3.1 million volumes) are the country's largest. Switzerland also has a comprehensive public system with 2,344 branches holding a total of 28 million volumes. Important specialized institutions include the Swiss Federal Archives and the United Nations Office at Geneva.

== Libraries of International Organizations ==
- International Committee of the Red Cross Library
- United Nations Library & Archives Geneva

== National libraries and networks ==
- Swiss National Library, Bern
- Swiss Federal Archives, Bern
- Swiss National Sound Archives, Lugano
- Swiss Institute of Comparative Law
- Swiss Social Archives
- E-rara.ch
- ETH Library

== Regional and city libraries ==
- Bibliothèque de Genève
- Burgerbibliothek of Berne
- Pestalozzi-Bibliothek Zürich
- RERO (Library Network of Western Switzerland)
- St. Moritz Library
- Staatsarchiv Zürich
- Sukkulenten-Sammlung Zürich
- Zentral- und Hochschulbibliothek Luzern
- Zentralbibliothek Zürich
- Cantonal and University Library of Fribourg

== Specialized libraries ==
- Abbey library of Saint Gall
- Bodmer Library
- Fitz Hugh Ludlow Memorial Library
- Iron Library
- Israelitische Cultusgemeinde Zürich (ICZ)
- Kloster Allerheiligen, Schaffhausen

== University libraries ==
- Basel University Library
- Cantonal and University Library of Lausanne
- Münstergasse Library, University of Bern
- Cantonal and University Library of Fribourg

== See also ==
- Bibliosuisse, est.2019
- Copyright law of Switzerland
- List of archives in Switzerland
- List of libraries in Austria
- List of libraries in Germany
- Liechtensteinische Landesbibliothek
- Schweizerische Bibliophilen, est.1921
