= Lists of archives =

This is a list of archives from around the world. An archive is an establishment that collects, stores and preserves knowledge in several formats: books, manuscripts, journals, newspapers, magazines, sound and music recordings, videos, play-scripts, patents, databases, maps, stamps, prints, drawings and more. The International Council on Archives comprises 1400 members in 199 countries.

== By country ==
- List of archives in Albania
- List of archives in Algeria
- List of archives in Argentina
- List of archives in Armenia
- List of archives in Australia
- List of archives in Azerbaijan
- List of archives in Barbados
- List of archives in Belgium
- List of archives in Bolivia
- List of archives in Bosnia and Herzegovina
- List of archives in Brazil
- List of archives in Canada
- List of archives in Chile
- List of archives in Colombia
- List of archives in Croatia
- List of archives in Cuba
- List of archives in Cyprus
- List of archives in the Czech Republic
- List of archives in Denmark
- List of archives in Ecuador
- List of archives in Estonia
- List of archives in Finland
- List of archives in France
- List of archives in Germany
- List of archives in Greece
- List of archives in Hungary
- List of archives in Iceland
- List of archives in India
- List of archives in Israel
- List of archives in Italy
- List of archives in Japan
- List of archives in Mexico
- List of archives in Montenegro
- List of archives in the Netherlands
- List of archives in North Macedonia
- List of archives in Pakistan
- List of archives in Paraguay
- List of archives in Peru
- List of archives in Poland
- List of archives in Portugal
- List of archives in Russia
- List of archives in Serbia
- List of archives in Slovenia
- List of archives in South Africa
- List of archives in South Sudan
- List of archives in Spain
- List of archives in Sri Lanka
- List of archives in Switzerland
- List of archives in Thailand
- List of archives in Ukraine
- List of archives in the United Kingdom
- List of archives in the United States
- List of archives in Vatican City
- List of archives in Venezuela

== By format ==
- List of film archives
- List of newspaper archives
- List of sound archives

== See also ==
- Archival science
- Archivist and List of archivists
- Data proliferation
- International Council on Archives
- Internet Archive
- List of archivists
- List of libraries by country
- List of museums
- List of national archives
- List of historical societies
- Preservation (library and archival science)
- Web archiving
