= Australian Licensed Aircraft Engineers Association =

ALAEA
- Australian Licensed Aircraft Engineers Association
- Founded: 1964
- Headquarters: Sydney, New South Wales
- Location: Australia
- Members: ▼2,931 (as at 31 December 2024)
- Key people: Rod Wyse, Federal President; Glynn Sowter, General Manager
- Affiliations: ACTU, ITF, IFA, Air Engineers International (AEI)
- Website: alaea.asn.au

The Australian Licensed Aircraft Engineers Association (ALAEA) (sometimes spelled incorrectly as "Licenced") is an Australian employee organisation (effectively a trade union) which represents aircraft maintenance engineers. The ALAEA is registered with the Australian Industrial Relations Commission and affiliated with the Australian Council of Trade Unions. ALAEA is not affiliated with an Australian political party, but maintains industrial affiliations with the NSW Labor Council and the International Transport Workers' Federation. ALAEA was formed in 1964. It sees its own function as a professional association, which puts it within the services model of union organisation. ALAEA does not describe itself as a trade union, or organisation of workers.

The Australian Trade Union Archives claim that ALAEA's current membership is in excess of 3000 members. The ALAEA claims to have in excess of 4000 members and in its most recent annual return claimed to have 4085 members as of 1 January 2005, although this date could have been a typographical error (and should have been 1 January 2006) as the previous year's annual return also referred to the same date. ALAEA's membership coverage is for Licensed Aircraft Maintenance Engineers (LAMES), Aircraft Maintenance Engineers (AMES), technical and engineering support staff.

The main employer groups that the ALAEA has dealings with are Qantas, Virgin Australia, and Jetstar.
