= List of archives in Iceland =

This is list of archives in Iceland.

== Archives in Iceland ==
- National Archives of Iceland
- Reykjavík Municipal Archives

== See also ==
- List of archives
- List of museums in Iceland
- Culture of Iceland
