= List of libraries in Iceland =

This is a list of libraries in Iceland. According to the Consortium of Icelandic Libraries, there are more than 300 libraries in Iceland when school libraries and libraries of government agencies and ministries are included. The present list excludes school libraries below the university level as well as most libraries of government agencies which are not open to the public but participate in interlibrary loaning.

== Libraries by locale ==
=== Reykjavik ===
- Althingi Library, Parliament of Iceland
- Árni Magnússon Institute for Icelandic Studies Library
- Dagsbrún Library
- National and University Library of Iceland, Reykjavík
- National Gallery of Iceland Library
- Reykjavik City Library
- Technical College Reykjavík Library

=== Elsewhere ===
- Akranes Library
- Akureyri County Library
- Garðabær Library
- Hafnarfjörður Library
- Kópavogur Library
- Mosfellsbær Library
- Reykjanesbær Library
- Seltjarnarnes Library
- Vestmannaeyjar Library

== Libraries by type ==
=== State libraries ===
- Bókasafn Landbúnaðarháskóla Íslands
- Heilbrigðisvísindabókasafn
- Library of the Parliament (Icelandic: Bókasafn Alþingis)
- National and University Library of Iceland (Icelandic: Landsbókasafn Íslands – Háskólabókasafn)
- Skálholtsbókasafn

=== Municipal libraries ===
Library systems operating multiple branches under unified management are presented as a single entry, with branch locations following a colon. Organisationally distinct units (e.g. main collection, special collection) are consolidated into a single entry for the purposes of this list.

==== Capital Region ====
- Borgarbókasafnið: Árbær, Gerðuberg, Grófin, Kléberg, Kringlan, Sólheimar, Spöngin, Úlfarsárdalur
- Bókasafn Garðabæjar
- Bókasafn Hafnarfjarðar
- Bókasafn Kópavogs
- Bókasafn Mosfellsbæjar
- Bókasafn Seltjarnarness

==== Southern Peninsula ====
- Bókasafn Grindavíkur
- Bókasafn Reykjanesbæjar
- Bókasafn Suðurnesjabæjar

==== Western Region ====
- Amtsbókasafnið í Stykkishólmi
- Bókasafn Akraness
- Bókasafn Grundarfjarðar
- Bókasafn Snæfellsbæjar
- Héraðsbókasafn Borgarfjarðar
- Héraðsbókasafn Dalasýslu
- Snorrastofa

==== Westfjords ====
- Bókasafn Bolungarvíkur
- Bókasafn Vesturbyggðar: Bíldudalur, Patreksfjörður, Tálknafjörður
- Bókasafnið Ísafirði
- Héraðsbókasafn Reykhólahrepps
- Héraðsbókasafn Strandasýslu

==== Northwestern Region ====
- Bókasafn Húnaþings vestra
- Bókasafn Skagastrandar
- Héraðsbókasafn Austur-Húnavatnssýslu
- Héraðsbókasafn Skagfirðinga: Sauðárkrókur, Hofsós, Varmahlíð

==== Northeastern Region ====
- Amtsbókasafnið á Akureyri
- Bókasafn Aðaldæla
- Bókasafn Dalvíkurbyggðar
- Bókasafn Eyjafjarðarsveitar
- Bókasafn Fjallabyggðar: Ólafsfjörður, Siglufjörður
- Bókasafn Grýtubakkahrepps
- Bókasafn Mývatnssveitar
- Bókasafn Öxarfjarðar
- Bókasafn Reykdæla
- Bókasafnið á Húsavík
- Bókasafnið á Raufarhöfn
- Bókasafnið í Hrísey

==== Eastern Region ====
- Bókasafn Fáskrúðsfjarðar: Breiðdalsvík, Eskifjörður, Neskaupstaður, Reyðarfjörður, Stöðvarfjörður
- Bókasafn Múlaþings: Djúpivogur, Egilsstaðir, Seyðisfjörður
- Bókasafn Vopnafjarðar

==== Southern Region ====
- Bæjarbókasafn Ölfuss
- Bókasafn Árborgar: Eyrarbakki, Selfoss, Stokkseyri
- Bókasafn Grímsnes- og Grafningshrepps
- Bókasafn Hrunamanna
- Bókasafn Vestmannaeyja
- Bókasafn Vestur-Eyjafjalla
- Bókasafnið Hellu
- Bókasafnið í Hveragerði
- Héraðsbókasafn Rangæinga
- Héraðsbókasafn Vestur-Skaftafellssýslu
- Héraðsbókasafnið á Kirkjubæjarklaustri
- Lestrarfélag Skeiða- og Gnúpverjahrepps
- Bókasafn Menningarmiðstöðvar Hornafjarðar

=== Private libraries ===
==== Nongovernmental organisations ====
- Bókasafn Austurbrúar
- Bókasafn Dagsbrúnar
- Bókasafn Lögmannafélags Íslands
- Bókasafn Norræna hússins
- Rússneska bókasafnið

==== Nonprofit organisations ====
- Bókasafn Háskólaseturs Vestfjarða
- Bókasafn Háskólans á Bifröst
- Bókasafn Háskólans í Reykjavík
- Bókasafn Listaháskólans Stakkahlíð

== See also ==
- Icelandic literature
- Legal deposit in Iceland
- List of archives in Iceland
- Mass media in Iceland

=== in Icelandic ===
- Leitir.is, library catalog
