= List of archives in Estonia =

This is list of archives in Estonia.

- Estonian Folklore Archives
- National Archives of Estonia
  - Estonian Film Archives
  - Estonian State Archives
  - Estonian Historical Archives
- Tallinn City Archives

== See also ==
- List of archives
- List of museums in Estonia
- Culture of Estonia
