= List of archives in Peru =

This is a list of archives in Peru.

== Archives in Peru ==
- Archivo General de la Nación del Perú
- Archivo General del Congreso de la Republica
- Archivo Peruano de Imagen y Sonido
- Archivo Regional de Amazonas
- Archivo Regional de Ancash
- Archivo Regional de Apurímac
- Archivo Regional de Arequipa
- Archivo Regional de Ayacucho
- Archivo Regional de Cajamarca
- Archivo Regional de Callao
- Archivo Regional de Cusco
- Archivo Regional de Huancavelica
- Archivo Regional de Huánuco
- Archivo Regional de Ica
- Archivo Regional de Junín
- Archivo Regional de Lambayeque
- Archivo Regional de La Libertad
- Archivo Regional de Lima
- Archivo Regional de Loreto
- Archivo Regional de Madre de Dios
- Archivo Regional de Moquegua
- Archivo Regional de Pasco
- Archivo Regional de Piura
- Archivo Regional de Puno
- Archivo Regional de San Martín
- Archivo Regional de Tacna
- Archivo Subregional Bajo Mayo - Tarapoto
- Archivo de la Municipalidad de Lima
- Archivo Histórico de la Municipalidad de Piura

== See also ==
- List of archives
- List of libraries in Peru
- List of museums in Peru
- Culture of Peru
- Portal de Archivos Españoles (federated search of archives in Spain)
