= List of archives in Australia =

This is a list of archives in Australia.

== Archives in Australia ==
=== National ===
- Archives of the Australian Museum
- National Archives of Australia
- National Film and Sound Archive
- Australian Queer Archives
- Australian Mutuals Archives
- Australian Archives of the Dance
- Australian Data Archive
- Australian Trade Union Archives
- National Gallery of Australia Research Library
- National Library of Australia

=== State ===
- Tasmanian Archive and Heritage Office also known as the Archives Office of Tasmania
- J.S. Battye Library of West Australian History
- Northern Territory Archives Service
- Public Record Office Victoria
- State Library of Tasmania
- State Library of Victoria
- Archive Services Centre of Victoria Police - 135,000 boxes, part of over 500,000 items over more than 200 sites that they are responsible for.
- Queensland State Archives
- State Records Authority of New South Wales
- State Records of South Australia
- State Records Office of Western Australia

=== Capital City ===
- City of Sydney Archives
- Adelaide City Archives

=== Regional City / Town ===
- Geelong Heritage Centre

=== University ===
- Australian National University Archives
- University of Canberra Lu Rees Archives
- University of Melbourne
- University of New South Wales

=== Other ===
- ACT Heritage Library
- Noel Butlin Archives
- Pandora Archive

== See also ==
- List of archives
- List of museums in Australia
- Culture of Australia
