= List of archives in Chile =

This is list of archives in Chile.

== Archives in Chile ==
- National Archives of Chile
- Archivo General de Asuntos Indígenas

== See also ==
- List of archives
- List of museums in Chile
- Culture of Chile
- Portal de Archivos Españoles (federated search of archives in Spain)
