= List of archives in Switzerland =

This is a list of archives in Switzerland.

== Archives in Switzerland ==
- Bibliothèque de Genève - Département des manuscrits et des archives privées
- Federal Archives of Switzerland
- International Committee of the Red Cross archives
- Swiss Film Archive
- Swiss Social Archives

== See also ==
- List of archives
- List of libraries in Switzerland
- List of museums in Switzerland
