= List of archives in Cyprus =

This is list of archives in Cyprus.

== Archives in Cyprus ==
- Cyprus State Archives

== See also ==
- List of archives
- List of museums in Cyprus
- Culture of Cyprus
