= Ducret =

Ducret is a French surname. Notable people with the surname include:

- André Ducret (1945–2025), Swiss singer, composer, choir conductor, and teacher
- Arnaud Ducret (born 1978), French actor and comedian
- Blandine Bitzner-Ducret (born 1965), French long-distance runner
- Diane Ducret (born 1982), Franco-Belgian writer
- Jean Ducret (1887–1975), French footballer
- Marc Ducret (born 1957), French jazz guitarist
- Roger Ducret (1888–1962), French fencer
- Stéphane Ducret (born 1970), Swiss contemporary artist
