= Scopf von dem lône =

Medieval German poem

Scopf von dem lône or Scoph von dem lone is a fragmentary twelfth-century didactic poem in the Allemanic dialect of Early Middle High German, which gives instruction on pious living in the secular world. Generically it is somewhere between a verse sermon and theological tract.

== Title ==
The title Scopf von dem lône ('poem of the heavenly reward') was coined by Ernst Martin, and has remained the standard title, though Friedrich Maurer and others found it "unfortunate" (nicht sehr glücklich). Scopf (spelled scoph in the manuscript) is a rare Middle High German word meaning 'composition', connected to German schöpfen ('create'), and appears as the last word of the poem, part of an epilogue asking the reader to pray for the poet. Lôn (dative: lône), means 'payment, reward, punishment, recompense'; Paradise as a reward for piety is one of the themes of the poem, but as Maurer points out, not the major one.

== Themes ==
The poet opens with a lament about human wickedness, inherited from Cain. Redemption is possible through Christ, but human fickleness means we are constantly in jeopardy. The poem explores the dangers of being married to an impious husband or wife. A good person delights in God's creation, which includes the hell to which the sinner will be consigned. As an example of goodness we are referred to Martin of Tours dividing his cloak. Like St Martin, the good person will be rewarded in the next life. The tax-collecter Zacchaeus is then cited as an example of a sinner who experienced God's mercy.

== Transmission ==
The poem survives in a double-page fragment discovered in Colmar in the late 19th century (Colmar, Archives Départementales du Haut-Rhin, Fragments de Ms. no. 560), which had been glued into the bindings of a 15th-century urbarium. It was first published in 1896 together with the two other works found in the fragments, Crescentia and Cantilena de conversione Sancti Pauli. A thematic coherence between the Cantilena and the Scopf has been identified which would explain their transmission in a single manuscript.

== Editions ==
The poem was first published by Ernst Martin in 1896. There are critical editions by Friedrich Maurer and Hans Joachim Gernetz.

== Sources ==
- Gernentz, Hans Joachim (1970). Kleinere deutsche Gedichte des 11. und 12. Jahrhunderts. Nach der Ausgabe von Albert Waag. Vol. ). Leipzig.
- Krotz, Elke (2024). "Handschriftenbeschreibung 4648". Handschriftencensus.
- Martin, Ernst (1896). "Colmarer Bruchstücke aus dem 12. Jahrhundert". Zeitschrift für deutsches Altertum und deutsche Literatur. 40: 305–331.
- Maurer, Friedrich (1965). Die religiösen Dichtungen des 11. und 12. Jahrhunderts. Vol. II. Tübingen: Max Niemeyer.
- Murdoch, Brian (1991). "Treasures Stored In Heaven: The Early Alemannic Scopf Von Dem Lone". Amsterdamer Beiträge zur älteren Germanistik. 33: 89–115.
- Murdoch, Brian (2007). "Serving the Church: the Early Middle High German Cantilena de conversione Sancti Pauli and the Colmar Manuscript". Neophilologus. 91: 459–472.
- Papp, Edgar (1992). "Scoph von dem lone". Verfasserlexikon. Vol. 8. cols. 955-959.
- Vollmann-Profe, Gisela (1986). Wiederbeginn volksprachlicher Schriftlichkeit im hohen Mittelalter (1050/60–1160/70). Geschichte der deutschen Literatur von den Anfängen bis zum Beginn der Neuzeit. Vol. I, Teil 2. Königstein/Taunus: Athenäum. ISBN 3-7610-8301-7.
