= List of archives in the United States =

This is list of archives in the United States.

== Archives in the United States ==
=== National ===
- Library of Congress
- National Archives and Records Administration
  - Civilian Personnel Records Center
  - Electronic Records Archives
  - National Personnel Records Center
  - Military Personnel Records Center
- Smithsonian Institution Archives
  - National Anthropological Archives
  - Ralph Rinzler Folklife Archives and Collections

=== State ===
- Alabama Department of Archives and History
- California Ethnic and Multicultural Archives
- State Library and Archives of Florida
- Georgia Archives
- Indiana State Library and Historical Bureau
- Kentucky Department for Libraries and Archives
- Louisiana State Archive and Research Library
- Maryland State Archives
- Mississippi Department of Archives & History
- New York State Archives
- Oregon State Archives
- Pennsylvania State Archives
- Tennessee State Library and Archives
- Texas State Library and Archives
- Washington State Digital Archives
- West Virginia & Regional History Center
- Wisconsin Historical Society

=== City ===
- City of Boston Archives
- New York City Municipal Archives

=== Others ===
- Academy Film Archive
- American Archive of Public Broadcasting
- American Heritage Center
- American Radio Archive
- Archive for Research in Archetypal Symbolism
- Archives of American Art
- Archives of the History of American Psychology
- Austin History Center
- Black Archives of Mid-America
- Charles E. Stevens American Atheist Library and Archives
- Gulf Coast Archive and Museum of Gay, Lesbian, Bisexual and Transgender History
- GLBT Historical Society
- Harvard Film Archive
- Historic Films Archive
- The History Project
- Hoover Institution Library and Archives
- Interference Archive
- Internet Archive
- The Jacob Rader Marcus Center of the American Jewish Archives
- Jean-Nickolaus Tretter Collection in Gay, Lesbian, Bisexual and Transgender Studies
- Lambda Archives of San Diego
- Lesbian Herstory Archives
- Mennonite Church USA Archives
- Marquette University Special Collections and University Archives
- National African American Archives and Museum
- National Public Broadcasting Archives
- National Security Archive
- The NEXT: Museum, Library, and Preservation Space
- ONE National Gay & Lesbian Archives
- Rhizome ArtBase
- Scottish Rite Masonic Museum & Library
- Seeley G. Mudd Manuscript Library at Princeton University
- Sophia Smith Collection of Women's History at Smith College
- South Texas Archives and Special Collections
- Southern Historical Collection
- Ukrainian Museum-Archives
- Walter P. Reuther Library, Archives of Labor and Urban Affairs
- Washington Area Performing Arts Video Archive
- Washington University Film & Media Archive
- Many presidential libraries include archives.
- Many large organizations such as universities, corporations, newspapers, and so on maintain archives consisting of the papers and records which have been created during the course of the organization's life.

== See also ==
- List of archives
- ArchiveGrid
- Digital Public Library of America
- List of libraries in the United States
- List of museums in the United States
- Culture of the United States
