= Reykjavík Municipal Archives =

Coordinates: 64.1494°N 21.9414°W

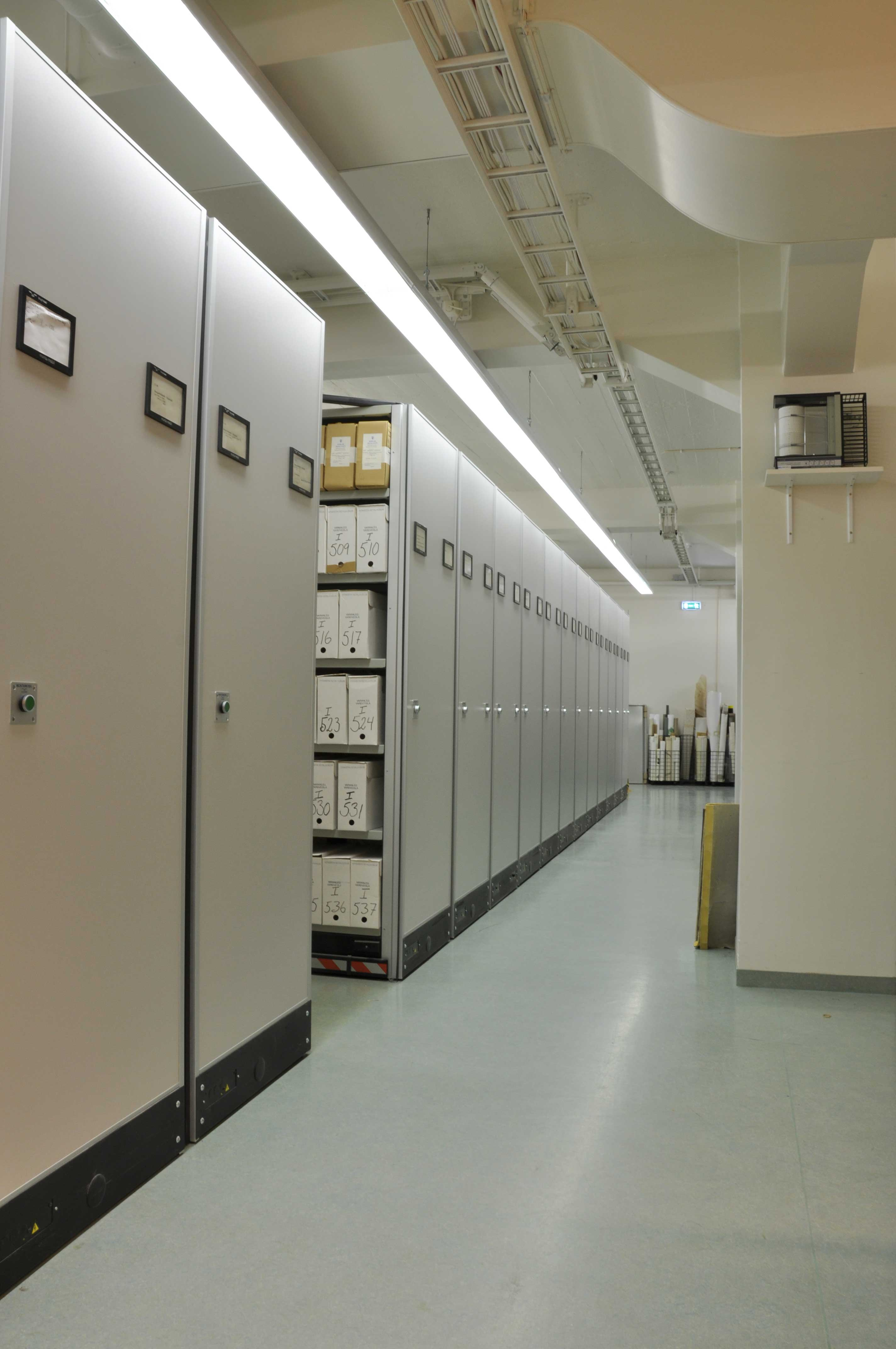
File cabinets in the Reykjavík Municipal Archives

Reykjavík Municipal Archives (Icelandic: Borgarskjalasafn Reykjavíkur [ˈpɔrkarˌscaːlaˌsapn ˈreiːcaˌviːkʏr̥]) is an independent institution of Reykjavík municipality, the most populous municipality and capital of Iceland. The Reykjavík Municipal Archives collects, records and preserves various records pertaining the operation and history of both public institutions as well as private enterprises and individuals related to Reykjavík.

The Reykjavík Municipal Archives contain the personal records collections of former Icelandic prime ministers Ólafur Thors and Bjarni Benediktsson which are to a large extent accessible online.

The objective of The Reykjavík Municipal Archives is to supervise on, and survey, records management at various city institutions: offices, schools, agencies, etc., ensure the safe preservation of old records and maintain proper indexing and storage of current records. The National Archives of Iceland supervises Reykjavík Municipal Archives with regard to policy.

== History ==
The Reykjavík Municipal Archives was originally established in 1954. Before that city records were kept at the National Archives of Iceland.
