= List of museums in Vatican City =

This is a list of museums in Vatican City.

== Museums in Vatican City ==
- Museo del Tesoro di San Pietro
- Vatican Museums
  - Gregoriano Etrusco Museum
  - Gregoriano Profano Museum
  - Modern Religious Art Museum
  - Pio-Clementino Museum
  - Pio Cristiano Museum
  - The Gallery of Maps
  - Vatican Historical Museum
  - Museo missionario etnologico

== See also ==
- List of museums
- List of archives in Vatican City
- List of libraries in Vatican City
- Culture of Vatican City
