= List of archives in France =

This is a list of archives in France.

== Archives in France ==
- Archives du Féminisme
- Archives nationales (France)
- Centre des Archives diplomatiques
- Defence Historical Service

== Departements of France ==
- Archives départementales de l'Ain
- Archives départementales de l'Aisne
- Archives départementales de l'Allier
- Archives départementales des Alpes-de-Haute-Provence
- Archives départementales des Hautes-Alpes
- Archives départementales des Alpes-Maritimes
- Archives départementales de l'Ardèche
- Archives départementales des Ardennes
- Archives départementales de l'Ariège
- Archives départementales de l'Aube
- Archives départementales de l'Aude
- Archives départementales de l'Aveyron
- Archives départementales des Bouches-du-Rhône
- Archives départementales du Calvados
- Archives departementales du Cantal
- Archives départementales de la Charente
- Archives départementales de la Charente-Maritime
- Archives départementales du Cher
- Archives départementales de la Corrèze
- Archives départementales de la Corse-du-Sud
- Archives départementales de la Haute-Corse
- Archives départementales de la Côte-d'Or
- Archives départementales des Côtes-d'Armor
- Archives départementales de la Creuse
- Archives départementales de la Dordogne
- Departmental archives of Doubs
- Archives départementales de la Drôme
- Archives départementales de l'Eure
- Archives départementales d'Eure-et-Loir
- Archives départementales du Finistère
- Archives départementales du Gard
- Archives départementales de la Haute-Garonne
- Archives départementales du Gers
- Archives départementales de la Gironde
- Archives départementales de l'Hérault
- Archives départementales d'Ille-et-Vilaine
- Archives départementales de l'Indre
- Archives départementales d'Indre-et-Loire
- Archives départementales de l'Isère
- Archives départementales du Jura
- Archives départementales des Landes
- Archives départementales de Loir-et-Cher
- Archives départementales de la Loire
- Archives départementales de la Haute-Loire
- Archives départementales de la Loire-Atlantique
- Archives départementales du Loiret
- Archives départementales du Lot
- Archives départementales de Lot-et-Garonne
- Archives départementales de la Lozère
- Archives départementales de Maine-et-Loire
- Archives départementales de la Manche
- Archives départementales de la Marne
- Archives départementales de la Haute-Marne
- Archives départementales de la Mayenne
- Archives départementales de la Meurthe-et-Moselle
- Archives départementales de la Meuse
- Archives départementales du Morbihan
- Archives départementales de la Moselle
- Archives départementales de la Nièvre
- Archives départementales du Nord
- Archives départementales de l'Oise
- Archives départementales de l'Orne
- Archives départementales du Pas-de-Calais
- Archives départementales du Puy-de-Dôme
- Archives départementales des Pyrénées-Atlantiques
- Archives départementales des Hautes-Pyrénées
- Archives départementales des Pyrénées-Orientales
- Archives départementales du Bas-Rhin
- Archives départementales du Haut-Rhin
- Service d'archives du département du Rhône et de la métropole de Lyon
- Archives départementales de la Haute-Saone
- Archives départementales de Saône-et-Loire
- Archives départementales de la Sarthe
- Archives départementales de la Savoie
- Archives départementales de la Haute-Savoie
- Archives de Paris
- Archives départementales de Seine-Maritime
- Archives départementales de la Seine-Maritime
- Archives départementales de Seine-et-Marne
- Archives départementales des Yvelines
- Archives départementales des Deux-Sèvres
- Archives départementales de la Somme
- Archives départementales du Tarn
- Archives départementales de Tarn-et-Garonne
- Archives départementales du Var
- Archives départementales de Vaucluse
- Archives départementales de la Vendée
- Archives départementales de la Vienne
- Archives départementales de la Haute-Vienne
- Archives départementales des Vosges
- Archives départementales de l'Yonne
- Archives départementales du Territoire de Belfort
- Archives départementales de l'Essonne
- Archives départementales des Hauts-de-Seine
- Archives départementales de la Seine-Saint-Denis
- Archives départementales du Val-de-Marne
- Archives départementales du Val-d'Oise
- Archives départementales de la Guadeloupe
- Archives départementales de la Martinique
- Archives départementales de la Guyane
- Archives départementales de La Réunion
- Archives départementales de Mayotte

== See also ==
- List of archives
- List of libraries in France
- List of museums in France
- Culture of France
