= List of archives in Montenegro =

Montenegro’s archival heritage spans administrative, judicial, and private collections from the Venetian (1420–1797), French (1797–1814), Austrian (1814–1918), and Yugoslav (1918–1992) periods, as well as the Kingdom and Principality of Montenegro. The State Archives of Montenegro, established in 1951 and headquartered in Cetinje, leads the archival network with branches in cities like Kotor, Podgorica, and Bar.

== List of archives in Montenegro ==
=== State archives ===
- State Archives of Montenegro (Headquarters in Cetinje)
  - State Archives of Montenegro, Podgorica
  - State Archives of Montenegro, Danilovgrad
  - State Archives of Montenegro, Nikšić
  - State Archives of Montenegro, Kolašin
  - State Archives of Montenegro, Berane
  - State Archives of Montenegro, Andrijevica
  - State Archives of Montenegro, Bijelo Polje
  - State Archives of Montenegro, Pljevlja
  - State Archives of Montenegro, Budva
  - State Archives of Montenegro, Kotor
  - State Archives of Montenegro, Herceg Novi
  - State Archives of Montenegro, Ulcinj
  - State Archives of Montenegro, Bar
  - State Archives of Montenegro, Cetinje
  - Archive of the History of Labour Movement of the State Archive of Montenegro

=== Religious communities archives ===
- Archive of Serbian Orthodox Church in Kotor
- Diocesan Archives of Kotor
- Parish archives of Church of St. Nicholas in Perast
- Archdiocesan Archives of Bar

== See also ==
- List of archives
- List of museums in Montenegro
- Culture of Montenegro
