= List of archives in Vatican City =

This is a list of archives in Vatican City.

== Archives in Vatican City ==
- Vatican Apostolic Archive (formerly known as the Vatican Secret Archive)
- Archive of the Congregation for the Doctrine of the Faith
- Vatican Film Library

== See also ==
- List of archives
- List of museums in Vatican City
- Culture of Vatican City
