= List of archives in Thailand =

This is list of archives in Thailand.

== Archives in Thailand ==
- National Archives of Thailand
- Thai Film Archive
- Maejo University Archives
- Payap University Archives

== See also ==
- List of archives
- List of libraries in Thailand
- List of museums in Thailand
- Culture of Thailand
