= State Archives of Montenegro =

- Државни архив Црне Горе (Montenegrin)

Agency overview
- Formed: 1951; 75 years ago
- Jurisdiction: Government of Montenegro
- Headquarters: Cetinje, Montenegro; 42°23′18″N 18°55′26″E
- Website: Official website

The State Archives of Montenegro (Montenegrin: Državni arhiv Crne Gore, Државни архив Црне Горе) are the national archives of the country of Montenegro, located in its historic capital of Cetinje. The archives were established in 1951, while their history can be traced back to the late 19th century. Its director is Sasa Tomanovic.

== History ==
History of archival work in Montenegro is related to archival work of the local religious communities, particularly the Metropolitanate of Montenegro and the Littoral and its predecessors in the Prince-Bishopric of Montenegro. Local Eastern Orthodox monasteries preserved medieval texts while central public records in Venice ruled Bay of Kotor, particularly the town of Kotor and Herceg Novi, developed in 1200s and in 15th century respectively. Professional public archival services however developed relatively late after the end of the World War II in Yugoslavia and the establishment of the People's Republic of Montenegro. Three years after the war, the Historical Institute of Montenegro at Cetinje established the archival unit that will directly develop into the modern day State Archives of Montenegro.

== Archival network ==
Alongside the central archive administration in Cetinje, the archive is organized into multiple local branch institutions around the country:

  - State Archives of Montenegro, Podgorica
  - State Archives of Montenegro, Danilovgrad
  - State Archives of Montenegro, Nikšić
  - State Archives of Montenegro, Kolašin
  - State Archives of Montenegro, Berane
  - State Archives of Montenegro, Andrijevica
  - State Archives of Montenegro, Bijelo Polje
  - State Archives of Montenegro, Pljevlja
  - State Archives of Montenegro, Budva
  - State Archives of Montenegro, Kotor
  - State Archives of Montenegro, Herceg Novi
  - State Archives of Montenegro, Ulcinj
  - State Archives of Montenegro, Bar
  - State Archives of Montenegro, Cetinje
  - Archive of the History of Labour Movement of the State Archive of Montenegro

== See also ==
- List of archives in Montenegro
