= André Ducret =

Swiss singer and composer (1945–2025)

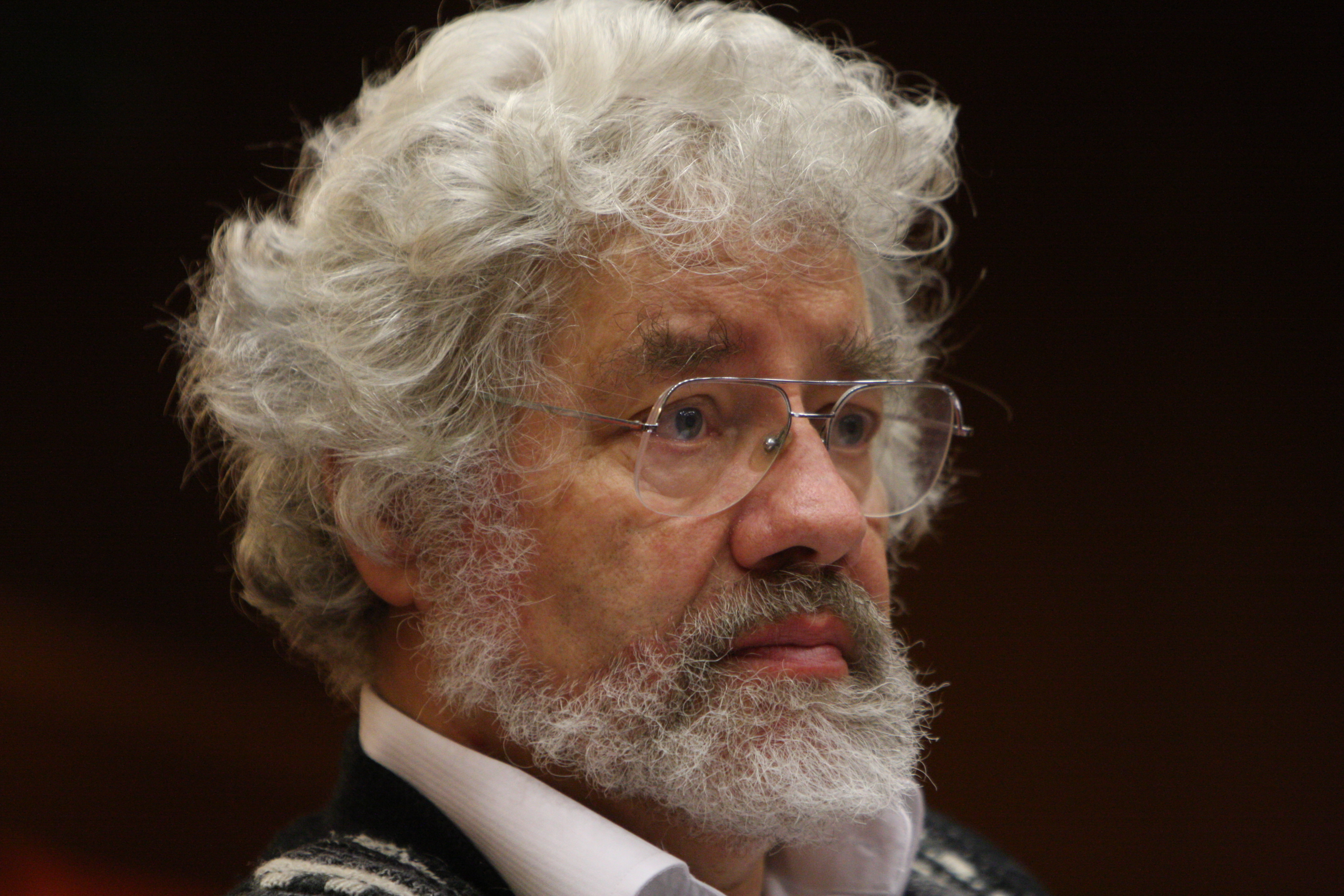
- Ducret in 2008
- Born: 4 June 1945; Fribourg, Switzerland
- Died: 1 February 2025 (aged 79)
- Occupation(s): Singer; Composer

André Ducret (4 June 1945 – 1 February 2025) was a Swiss singer, composer, choir conductor and teacher.

== Life and career ==
Born in Fribourg on 4 June 1945, Ducret was gifted a tenor voice and performed as a soloist in works composed by Pierre Kaelin, Raoul Follereau, and Émile Gardaz. He then founded the Chœur des XVI, which he directed from 1970 to 2018. In 1980, he participated in the Étoile d'or competition, organized by Télévision Suisse Romande, in which he won first prize with the work Noël à danser, performed by the Chœur de Sainte-Thérèse. In 2004, he participated in an international competition in Barcelona and was a finalist, which preceded his victory in the Association faîtière européenne.

As a teacher at the Collège Saint-Michel, he developed methods for reading music. On 4 June 2007, an exhibition of his works was opened at the Cantonal and University Library of Fribourg, which displayed nearly 500 works. A book titled André Ducret, compositeur, chef de chœur et pédagogue was published for the occasion. In 2013, the association Plans Fixe released a report dedicated to him. In 2022, a biographical work on him was written by Philippe Rolle.

Ducret died on 1 February 2025, at the age of 79.
