= List of archives in Pakistan =

This is list of archives in Pakistan.

== Public ==
- National Archives of Pakistan, Islamabad
- Punjab Archives, Lahore
- Sindh Archives, Karachi

== Private ==
- Mountain Heritage Archives, Gilgit-Baltistan
- Citizen's Archive of Pakistan, Karachi
- Citizen's Archive of Pakistan, Karachi
- Chughtai Public Library

== See also ==
- List of archives
- List of museums in Pakistan
- Culture of Pakistan
