= List of archives in the Netherlands =

This is list of archives in the Netherlands.

== Archives in the Netherlands ==
- Afrika-Studiecentrum, African library and archive, Leiden
- Amsterdam City Archives
- Dutch Institute for War Documentation, Amsterdam
- Expatriate Archive Centre, The Hague
- International Institute of Social History, Amsterdam
- Atria Institute on gender equality and women's history, Amsterdam
- IHLIA LGBTI Heritage, Amsterdam
- Leiden University Library, special collections
- Nationaal Archief, The Hague
- Noord-Hollands Archief, Haarlem
- Spaarnestad Photo, Haarlem
- Historisch Centrum Overijssel, Zwolle
- Regionaal Archief Rivierenland, Tiel
- Zeeuws Archief
- Zuid-Afrikahuis, South African library and archive, Amsterdam

== See also ==
- List of archives
- List of museums in the Netherlands
- Culture of the Netherlands
