= List of archives in Ecuador =

This is list of archives in Ecuador.

== Archives in Ecuador ==
- Archivo Histórico "Alfredo Pareja Diezcanseco" del Ministerio de Relaciones Exteriores de Ecuador
- Archivo Nacional República del Ecuador

== See also ==
- List of archives
- List of museums in Ecuador
- Culture of Ecuador
