= Tomas Schmit =

Tomas Schmit (born 13 July 1943 in Thier, now part of Wipperfürth, died 4 October 2006 in Berlin, Germany) was an artist and author associated with the Fluxus movement of the early 1960s and created during the subsequent 40 years a multi-layered work that comprises drawings, editions, theoretical texts and artists books.

== Life and career ==
Tomas Schmit grew up in Their and Cologne and became an active member of the Rhineland art scene in the early 1960s, before he moved to Berlin in 1965 where he lived and worked for the next 40 years. He started his career as artist, however, when he met artist and composer Nam June Paik in Cologne in 1961, who introduced him to George Maciunas and his Fluxus activities. In 1962, Schmit took part in the event Neo Dada in der Musik (Neo Dada in Music), hosted by the Kammerspiele Düsseldorf and in Parallele Aufführungen Neuer Musik (Parallel Performances of New Music) in Amsterdam. At this time, he also wrote his first pieces. From 1963 onwards, he then participated in most of the European Fluxus events happening across 1963–1965 in Copenhagen, Paris, Düsseldorf, London and Berlin. In 1964, Schmit took the role of an organiser and together with Lithuanian Valdis Abolins arranged for the legendary event Festival der neuen Kunst at the Technical University of Aachen, which took place on 20 July (with Beuys, Köpcke, Vostell, Paik amongst others) and was as widely discussed in the media as it was criticised by the public. On 5 July, Schmit took part in the event 24 Hours organised by Parnass Gallery in Wuppertal and in this context present his piece action without audience which can be considered a radical critique of such events.

In 1982, in the book 1962 Wiesbaden Fluxus 1982, Schmit wrote the theoretical text "about f" which represents one of the rare profound evaluations of the ideas of Fluxus from the artist's perspective. Schmit was against an adulteration of the radical potential which he considered as his the most important working principle he based his own work on:

"what I learned from f., along with many other things: what can be mastered by a sculpture, doesn't have to be erected as a building; what can be brought by a painting, doesn't have to be made as a sculpture; what can be accomplished in a drawing, doesn't have to become a painting; what can be cleared on a scrap of paper, doesn't need to be done as a drawing; and what can be settled in the head, doesn't even require a paper scrap!".

In Berlin, Schmit first worked with Ludwig Gosewitz and Gerhard Rühm and participated with them in the Music Festival at Forum-Theater in Berlin organised by the Gallery of René Block. His closest artist friends were in addition to Ludwig Gosewitz, Addi Köpcke, George Brecht and Dieter Roth. From the late 1960s until his death, Schmit shifted his practice, started working with drawing, writing and exhibition making. His work is nowadays part of renowned museum and private collections: among them Museum Ludwig in Cologne and the Collection of Harald Falckenberg in Hamburg.

His main topics are language, logic, paradoxes, biology, cybernetics, cerebral research, behaviour research and apperception theory. In 1989, Schmit published his book "first draft (of central aesthetics)" which combines many of his interests and was recommended by renowned cyberneticist Valentin Braitenberg as the best introduction to cerebral research:

"I actually intend to recommend this book when some physicist or whatever other beginner, as it often happens, will again ask me for an introduction to cerebral research. I suppose, it took a poet to grasp the charm of the material access to psychology, including the pleasure in self-critical accuracy. Consequently, the book is an antipode to what ever so often annoys you: the belittling of events and concealment of problems that popular science uses to ingratiate with the people – but, thus, only shows its disrespect for the audience."

The last publications about Schmit have been published in 2021 on the occasion of the "Tomas Schmit Retrospective", a project by the Neuer Berliner Kunstverein and the Kupferstichkabinett Berlin, in collaboration with the Arsenal Institute for Film and Video Art, Hamburger Bahnhof – Museum for Contemporary Art and the tomas schmit archive. His estate is located at the tomas schmit archive initiated by Galerist and Publisher Barbara Wien, where it can be studied after prior registration.

Schmit is buried at the cemetery of the Dorotheenstadt and Friedrichswerder communities in Berlin-Mitte, Germany.

== Catalogues of Works ==
- katalog 1. Koelnischer Kunstverein, Cologne 1978.
- katalog 2. Daad Gallery, Berlin, and Sprengelmuseum, Hannover 1987.
- katalog 3. Portikus, Frankfurt/Main 1997.
- katalog 4. Verlag der Buchhandlung Walther König, Cologne 2007.

== Publications ==
- tomas schmit: das gute dünken. Berlin 1970 (self-published).
- tomas schmit: erster entwurf (einer zentralen ästhetik). Berlin 1989 (self-published).
- tomas schmit liest eigene texte, vol. 1, Audio-CD. Wiens Verlag, Berlin 2005.
- tomas schmit liest eigene texte, vol. 2, Audio-CD. Wiens Verlag, Berlin 2005.
- tomas schmit: Dreizehn Montagsgespräche (Questions by Wilma Lukatsch). Wiens Verlag, Berlin 2008.

== Awards ==
- 1981: Research Residency of the Stiftung Kunstfonds, Bonn
- 1982: Stipend of the Rembrandt-Prize (Dieter Roth), Basel
- 1986: Kurt-Schwitters-Award of the city of Hanover
- 1990: Arthur Køpckes ærespris, Copenhagen
