= List of libraries in Thailand =

This is a list of libraries in Thailand:

== National libraries ==
- National Library of Thailand (หอสมุดแห่งชาติ)

== Library associations, consortia, and networks ==
- Journal Link
- Provincial University Library Network - Pulinet
- Special Libraries Group - Thai Library Association
- Thai Library Association, est.1954
- Thai Library Integrated System - ThaiLIS

== Academic libraries ==
=== Public and autonomous university libraries ===
- Burapha University Library, at Burapha University
- Chiang Mai University Library, at Chiang Mai University
- Chulalongkorn University Library, at Chulalongkorn University
- Kasetsart University Library, at Kasetsart University
- Khon Kaen University Library, at Khon Kaen University
- King Mongkut's Institute of Technology Ladkrabang Library, at King Mongkut's Institute of Technology Ladkrabang
- King Mongkut's University of Technology North Bangkok Library, at King Mongkut's University of Technology North Bangkok
- King Mongkut's University of Technology Library
- Mae Fah Luang University Library, at Mae Fah Luang University
- Maejo University Library, at Maejo University
- Mahasarakham University Library, at Mahasarakham University
- Mahidol University Library, at Mahidol University
- National Institute of Development Administration Library, at NIDA
- Prince of Songkla University Library, at PSU
- Rajamangala University of Technology, Thanyaburi
- Ramkhamhaeng University Library
- Silpakorn University Library
- Srinakharinwirot University Library
- Sukhothai Thammathirat Open University Library
- Suranaree University of Technology Library
- Thammasat University Library
- Ubon Ratchathani University Library
- University of Phayao Library, former Naresuan University Library
- Walailak University Library

=== Private university libraries ===
- Asian Institute of Technology Library
- Assumption University Library
- Bangkok University Library
- Dhurakij Pundit University Library
- Huachiew Chalermprakiet University Library
- Kasem Bundit University Library
- Mahanakorn University of Technology Library
- Payap University Library
- Rangsit University Library
- Saint John's University Library
- Shinawatra University Library
- Siam University Library
- South East Asia University Library
- Sripatum University Library
- University of the Thai Chamber of Commerce Library
- Martin de Tours Assumption College Library

== Medical libraries ==
- Siriraj Medical Library

== Public libraries ==
- Rajamangalapisek Library
- Bangkok City Library - The 4,789 m^{2} city library was opened in April 2017. Its facilities extend to four floors.

== Research institute libraries ==
- Armed Forces Research Institute of Medical Science (AFRIMS) Library
- Chulabhorn Research Institute Library
- Health Systems Research Institute Library
- Research Library of National Research Council of Thailand
- Science and Technology Knowledge Services - STKS
- Thailand Institute of Scientific and Technological Research (TISTR) Knowledge Centre

== Special libraries ==
- Maruey Knowledge & Resource Center: Library at Thailand's stock exchange next to the Queen Sirikit Center. Business and investment books.
- Neilson Hays Library
- Royal Thai Air Force Library
- Santi Pracha Dhamma Library
- Stang Mongkolsuk Library
- Suriyanuwat Library
- Thailand Creative & Design Center
- Thailand Knowledge Park - TKPark

== See also ==
- Copyright law of Thailand
- List of archives in Thailand
- List of libraries
- List of library associations
- List of library consortia
- List of national libraries
- List of schools in Thailand
- List of universities in Thailand
- Mass media in Thailand
