= General Archive of the Nation (Peru) =

National archive of Peru

- Archivo General de la Nación
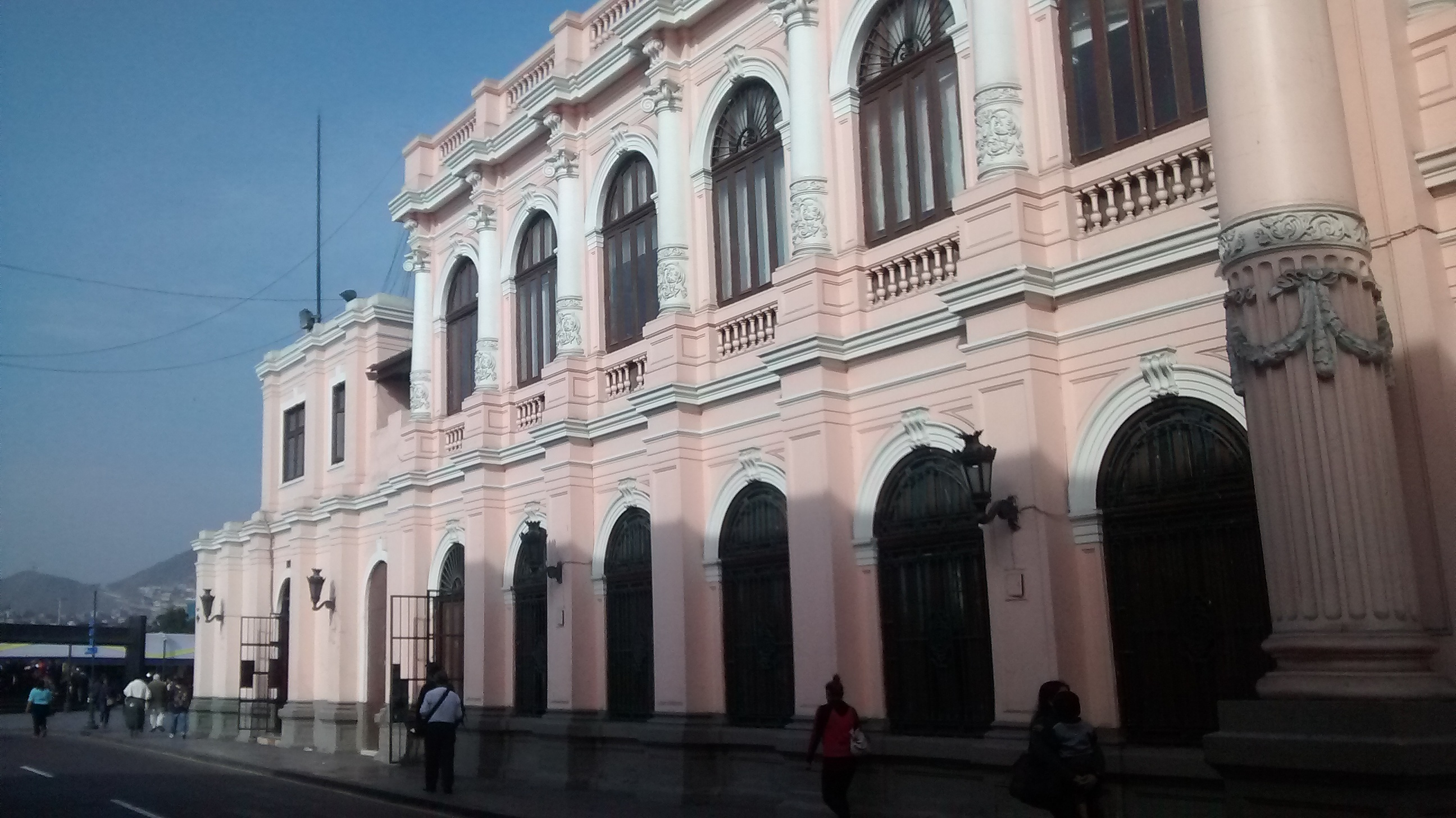
- Headquarters in Lima
- Formation: 1861
- Type: National archive
- Headquarters: Lima
- Location: Jirón Camaná 125
- Coordinates: 12.04362314515586°S 77.03063103328476°W
- Website: www.agn.gob.pe

UNESCO World Heritage Site
- Type: Non-movable
- Designated: 1991
- Part of: Historic Centre of Lima
- Reference no.: 500

The General Archive of the Nation (Spanish: Archivo General de la Nación) is the national archive of Peru, located in the historic centre of Lima.

== History ==
It was created on May 15, 1861, during the government of Ramón Castilla, as the National Archive (Spanish: Archivo Nacional), with the aim of safeguarding historical government documentation, which until then had been kept in the Convent of San Agustín. The archive was located in the old National Library.

In 1943, the archive, which houses approximately 150 million historical and administrative documents, was moved to the Palace of Justice. However, due to changes made to the building's infrastructure, the facility was put at risk in 2024.

In 1972, the Revolutionary Government of the Armed Forces changed its name to the "General Archive of the Nation," which remains to this day.

In 2010, it joined the newly created Ministry of Culture.

== List of directors ==
- Santiago Távara Andrade (1864–1867)
- Luis Benjamín Cisneros (1897–1903)
- Constantino R. Salazar (1904–1909)
- Luis Antonio Eguiguren Escudero (1914–1915)
- Guillermo Lohmann Villena (1985–1986)
- César Gutiérrez Muñoz (1986–1988)
- Aída Luz Mendoza Navarro (1992–2001)
- María del Pilar Remy Simatovic (2001–2003)
- Carmen Teresa Carrasco Cavero (2003–2007)
- Lizardo Pasquel Cobos (2007–2010)
- Joseph Dager Alva (2010–2012)
- Pablo Maguiña Minaya (2012–2016)
- Carmen Teresa Carrasco de González (2016–2017)
- Luisa María Vetter Parodi (2017–2019)
- Olinda Graciela Rengifo García (2019–2020)
- Jorge Ortiz Sotelo (2020–2022)
- Ricardo Moreau Heredia (2022-)

== See also ==
- List of national archives
- List of archives in Peru
