= Brandenburgisches Landeshauptarchiv =

Archive in Germany

Coordinates: 52°24′50″N 12°58′15″E

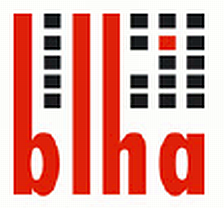
Logo of the BLHA

The Brandenburgisches Landeshauptarchiv (Brandenburgian State Main Archive; acronym BLHA) is the central state archive for the State (Land) of Brandenburg. It is located in Potsdam.

Records cover the Land of Brandenburg and its predecessors, back to the 10th century.

== History ==
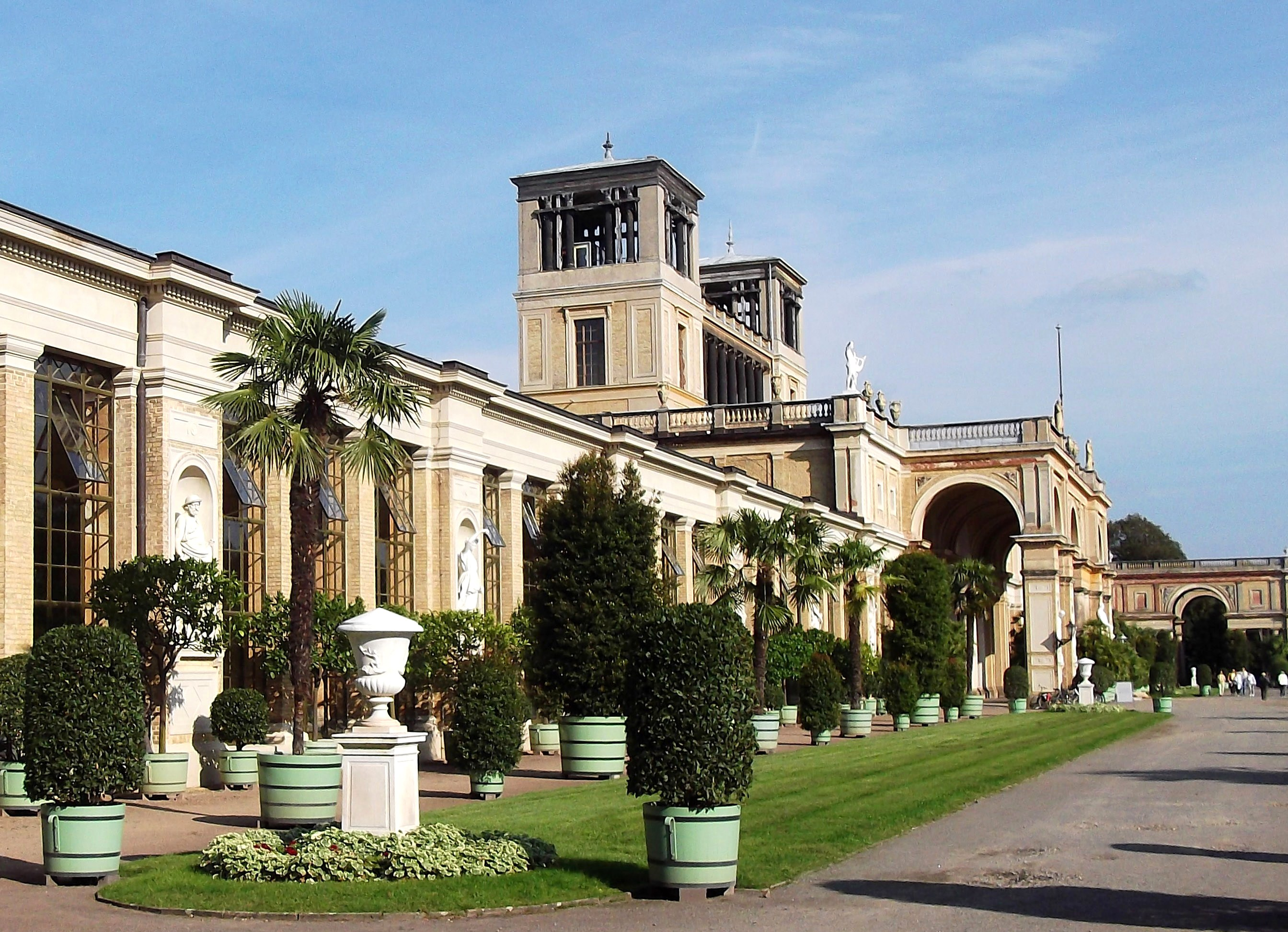
The Orangery Palace, eastern wing, where the BLHA used premises between 1949 and 2010.

It was founded as the Brandenburgian Provincial Archive (Brandenburgisches Provinzialarchiv) in 1883. The then Province of Brandenburg was the only Prussian province without a provincial archive, since the Prussian Privy State Archives fulfilled the task of archivation for Brandenburg, being the core province of Prussia. The provincial archive was renamed as State Archive for the Province of Brandenburg and the Reich Capital Berlin (Staatsarchiv für die Provinz Brandenburg und die Reichshauptstadt Berlin) in 1931, reflecting the fact, that formerly Brandenburgian Berlin formed as Greater Berlin a province-like political and territorial entity separate of Brandenburg.

On 21 June 1949 Brandenburg's minister of the interior, Bruno Lentzsch, again renamed the archive as the State Archive of Brandenburg (Landesarchiv Brandenburg), with divided Berlin running separate archives. The archive received its current name in 1951, however after the dissolution of the State of Brandenburg in 1952, along with all the states in East Germany, the term Brandenburg was skipped from its name to Potsdam State Archive (Staatsarchiv Potsdam) for the years 1965 to 1991, since being known again as the BLHA. Since the Archive's premises in the Orangery Palace were too small, the holdings were sparsed over several other places too, until they were all united in the Archive's new building in the quarter of Golm, opening on 1 March 2016 its gates to the users.
