= Tomas Schmit Archive =

Art collection and online archive

The Tomas Schmit Archive (German: Tomas Schmit Archiv; stylized as tomas schmit archive) is an art collection and online art archive dedicated to the work of German artist and author Tomas Schmit (1943–2006). It was established in 2008 by Barbara Wien, Schmit's estate executor, and art historian Wilma Lukatsch with the purpose of providing access to Schmit's work to the public; however, the physical archive in Berlin is closed to the public. The archive contains various drawings, photographs, correspondence, recordings, and editions by both Schmit and those who knew him, including Peter Brötzmann, Paul Lovens, Evan Parker, Stefan Ripplinger, Andrea Tippel, and Emmett Williams.
