= Archivo Histórico Provincial de Almería =

Spanish historical archive

- Formation: 1935
- Type: Historical archive
- Headquarters: Almería
- Coordinates: 36.8391°N 2.4661°W
- Official language: Spanish
- Owner: Ministerio de Cultura
- Website: juntadeandalucia.es/cultura/archivos/ahpalmeria

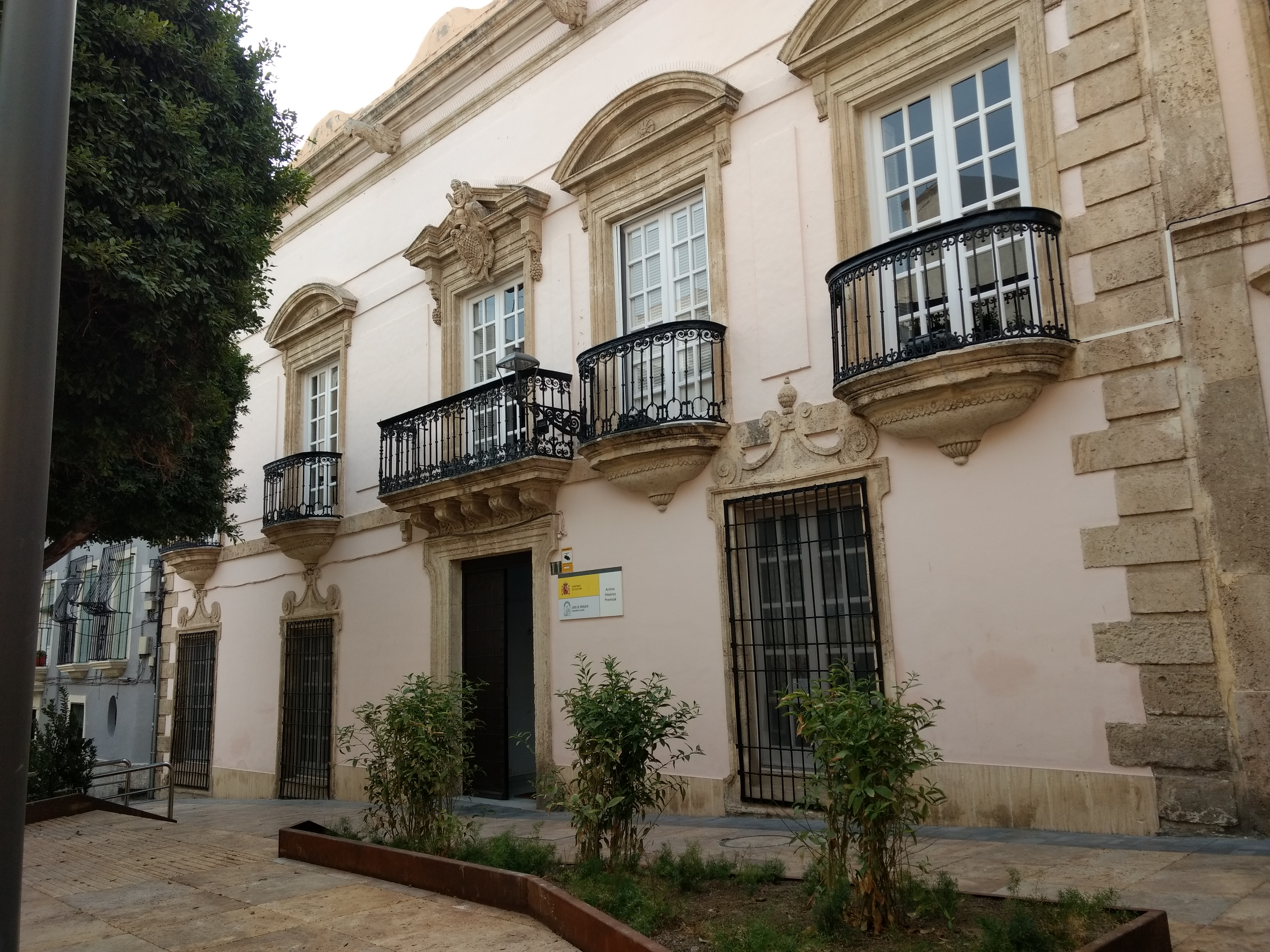

Archivo Histórico Provincial de Almería (AHPA) is one of the first historical archives established in Spain. In 1980s it was the palace of the Viscounts of Almansa. In 1935 it received the first notarial protocol from Almería, Berja, Canjáyar, Gérgal and Sorbas. It is owned by the Ministerio de Cultura.
