= National Archives of Estonia =

Coordinates: 58°22′41.76″N 26°42′48.63″E

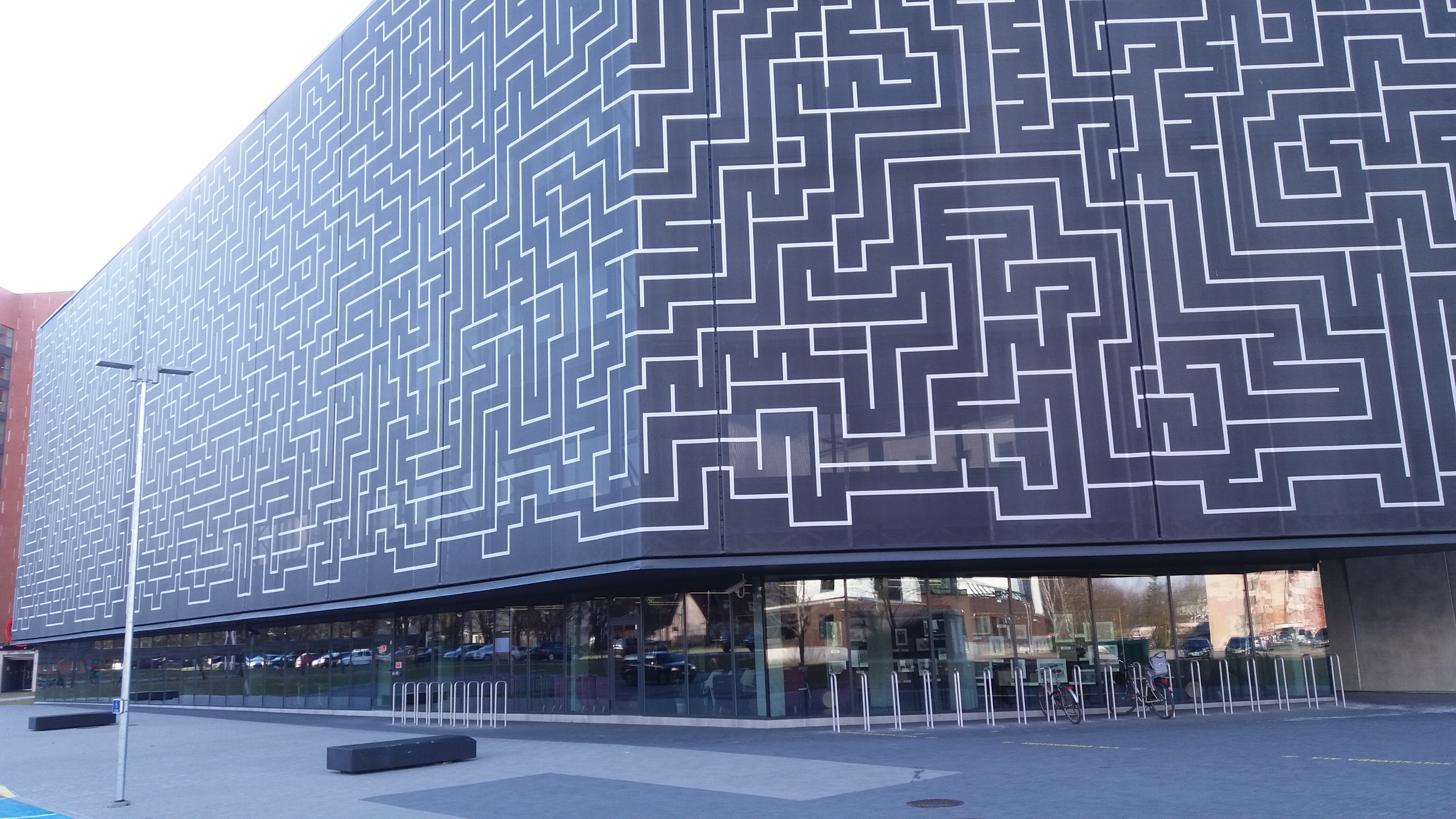
The main building of the National Archives of Estonia in Tartu

The National Archives of Estonia (NAE, Estonian: Rahvusarhiiv) has been the centre of archival administration in Estonia since 1999.

== Organization ==
NAE collects and preserves records documenting the history, culture, nationhood and social conditions in Estonia independent of the time or place of creation, or character of data medium. NAE is a government agency within the domain of the Ministry of Education and Research. It includes collection, preservation and access departments in Tallinn and in Tartu, regional departments in Rakvere and in Valga, as well as the film and digital archives. Development of research is covered by the research and publishing bureau, the support services function with the help of the administrative bureau.

The cornerstone of the new main building of NAE was laid in the spring of 2015 and was publicly opened in 2017. The new site covers 13,599 m^{2}, the building has 6 floors, with a total floor area of 10,708 m^{2} and a volume of 50,000 m³. The repository space covers 5,800 m^{2}, and contains 26 repositories which can store approximately 43,000 shelf metres.

== Collections ==
- 8.8 million records, the oldest from 1240; see the Archival Information System
- Millions of digital images with free access; see the digitized sources in Saaga
- 9.5 million metres of film recordings, the oldest from 1908
- More than half a million photos
- Almost 135,000 maps
- 2,200 seals
- About 1,500 parchments from the 13th to 19th century

== Family history research ==
NAE preserves sources for family history research. These include data about births, deaths and marriages of Estonians as well as Baltic Germans and the others lived in the area. There are also numerous personal files (records of university students, records of legal proceedings and of repressed individuals) which are helping to reveal the fragments of the everyday life and character of past generations. Most Estonians can trace their family lineage back to the beginning of the 18th century. Most of the handwritten texts preserved in NAE have been compiled in German and in Russian. Family history research can be conducted by individuals free of charge in the Saaga portal. Guidance for family history research as well as applications for an archival notice can be made electronically via the virtual reading room called VAU.

== Publications ==
NAE publishes the Past (in Estonian Tuna) and other publications which can be purchased at the NAE web shop.

== History and legislation ==
Although NAE is a young institution, the establishment of the national archives system started at the beginning of the Republic of Estonia. After the Archive Committee's first meeting on 3 March in 1920 the Historical Archives was established in Tartu as the repository for the records of historically significant institutions, and the State Archives in Tallinn became the keeper of records of active institutions. The 1935 Archives Act strengthened the role of archives in the preservation and use of society's valuable records. During the Soviet period the archives continued their work, the regional archives, which were active in larger towns, were renamed as city archives and governed by Moscow. Independent management of the archives was restored in the 1990s and the National Archives of Estonia became active on 1 January 1999, in accordance with the Archives Act passed in 1998. On 1 January 2012, the new Archives Act entered into force. The main objective of the Act is to create optimal legal terms and conditions in the transition to digital records and archives management. The reduction of the deadline for transferring records to the archives from 20 to 10 years is the most significant regulative change in the Act. It enables risk management in digital environment for long-term preservation and affords use of records in one secure competence centre – the National Archives. The detailed regulations for the public archives and for the archival creators can be found within the Archival Rules.

== See also ==
- List of national archives
