= List of archives in Spain =

This is a list of archives in Spain. There are more than 30,000 archives in Spain.

== Archives in Spain ==
=== Andalusia ===
- Archivo General de Indias
- Archivo Histórico Provincial de Almería
- Archivo Histórico Provincial de Cádiz
- Archivo Histórico Provincial de Córdoba
- Archivo Histórico Provincial de Granada
- Archivo de la Real Chancillería de Granada
- Archivo Histórico Provincial de Huelva
- Archivo Histórico Provincial de Jaén
- Archivo Histórico Provincial de Málaga
- Archivo Histórico Provincial de Sevilla

=== Aragon ===
- Archivo de la Administración de la Comunidad Autónoma de Aragón
- Archivo Histórico Provincial de Huesca
- Archivo Histórico Provincial de Teruel
- Archivo Histórico Provincial de Zaragoza
- Archivo de la Diputación Provincial de Huesca
- Archivo de la Diputación Provincial de Zaragoza
- Archivo Municipal de Zaragoza
- Archivo Universitario de la Universidad de Zaragoza
- Archivo de la Fundación Bernardo Aladrén (es)
- Archivo de la Casa de Ganaderos de Zaragoza (es)
- Archivo de la Catedral de Huesca

=== Principality of Asturias ===
- Archivo Histórico Provincial de Asturias
- Website http://www.archivosdeasturias.info

=== Balearic Islands ===
- Archivo del Reino de Mallorca

=== Basque Country ===
- Archivo Histórico Provincial de Álava
- Archivo Histórico Provincial de Guipúzcoa
- Archivo Histórico Provincial de Vizcaya

=== Canary Islands ===
- Archivo Histórico Provincial de Las Palmas "Joaquín Blanco"
- Archivo Histórico Provincial de Santa Cruz de Tenerife
- Archivo General de La Palma

=== Castile-La Mancha ===
- Archivo Histórico Provincial de Cuenca
- Archivo General de la Marina Álvaro de Bazán
- Municipal Archive of Toledo

=== Castile and León ===
- Archivo General Militar de Segovia
- Archivo Histórico Provincial de Segovia
- Archivo de la Real Chancillería de Valladolid
- Website http://www.archivoscastillayleon.jcyl.es

=== Catalonia ===
- Arxiu Nacional de Catalunya
- Arxiu Municipal de Barcelona composed of various archival centres, in addition to district archives.
- Arxiu de la Biblioteca de Catalunya
- Historic archives of the Universitat de Barcelona
- Archives of the Diputación de Barcelona

=== Extremadura ===
- Archivo Histórico Provincial de Badajoz
- Archivo Histórico Provincial de Cáceres
- Website http://www.archivosextremadura.com

=== Galicia ===
- Archivo del Reino de Galicia

=== Madrid ===
- Archivo Histórico Nacional

=== Valencian Community ===
- Archivo Histórico Provincial de Alicante
- Archivo del Reino de Valencia

=== Other ===
- Arxiu General de la Corona d'Aragó
- Archivo General de Simancas
- Archivo General de la Administración
- Centro Documental de la Memoria Histórica
- Sección Nobleza del Archivo Histórico Nacional
- Archivo Central del Ministerio de Cultura

== See also ==
- Portal de Archivos Españoles (federated search)
- List of libraries in Spain
- List of museums in Spain
- Open access in Spain

== Bibliography ==
- Crump, Charles George (1911). "Record" . In Chisholm, Hugh (ed.). Encyclopædia Britannica. Vol. 22 (11th ed.). Cambridge University Press. pp. 958–965, see page 964. "Spain.—The nearest approach to a central Record Office for Spain is the Archivo General Central, established by a royal ordinance of 1858 at Alcala de Henares, near Madrid. The collection there includes...."
- Francisco Rodríguez Marín [in Spanish], ed. (1916). Guia histórica y descriptiva de los archivos, bibliotecas y museos arqueológicos de España (in Spanish). Madrid: Tipografia de la Revista de archivos, bibliotecas y museos. hdl:2027/mdp.39015039247625.
- Henri Lapeyre (1966), "Les archives de Valence", Caravelle: Cahiers du monde hispanique et luso-brésilien (in French), ISSN 2272-9828 – via Persee.fr
- Eduardo Gomez-Llera García-Nava (1994), "Los Archivos Históricos Provinciales", Cuadernos de Historia Moderna (in Spanish), no. 15, Complutense University of Madrid, ISSN 0214-4018
- Amparo García Cuadrado (1998), "La investigación en historia de las instituciones documentales: estado de la investigación y propuesta metodológica", Anales de Documentación (in Spanish), vol. 1, University of Murcia, ISSN 1697-7904
