= Archivo Histórico Provincial de Granada =

Archives for Granada

- 37.19250416710637°N 3.604457808002418°W
- Location: Spain

Other information
- Website: www.juntadeandalucia.es/cultura/archivos/ahpgranada

The Archivo Histórico Provincial de Granada is the historical archives for the Spanish Province of Granada.
