= List of archives in South Sudan =

This is a list of archives in South Sudan.

== Archives in South Sudan ==
- National Archives of South Sudan
