= Prussian Privy State Archives =

Coordinates: 52°27′40.55″N 13°17′33.47″E

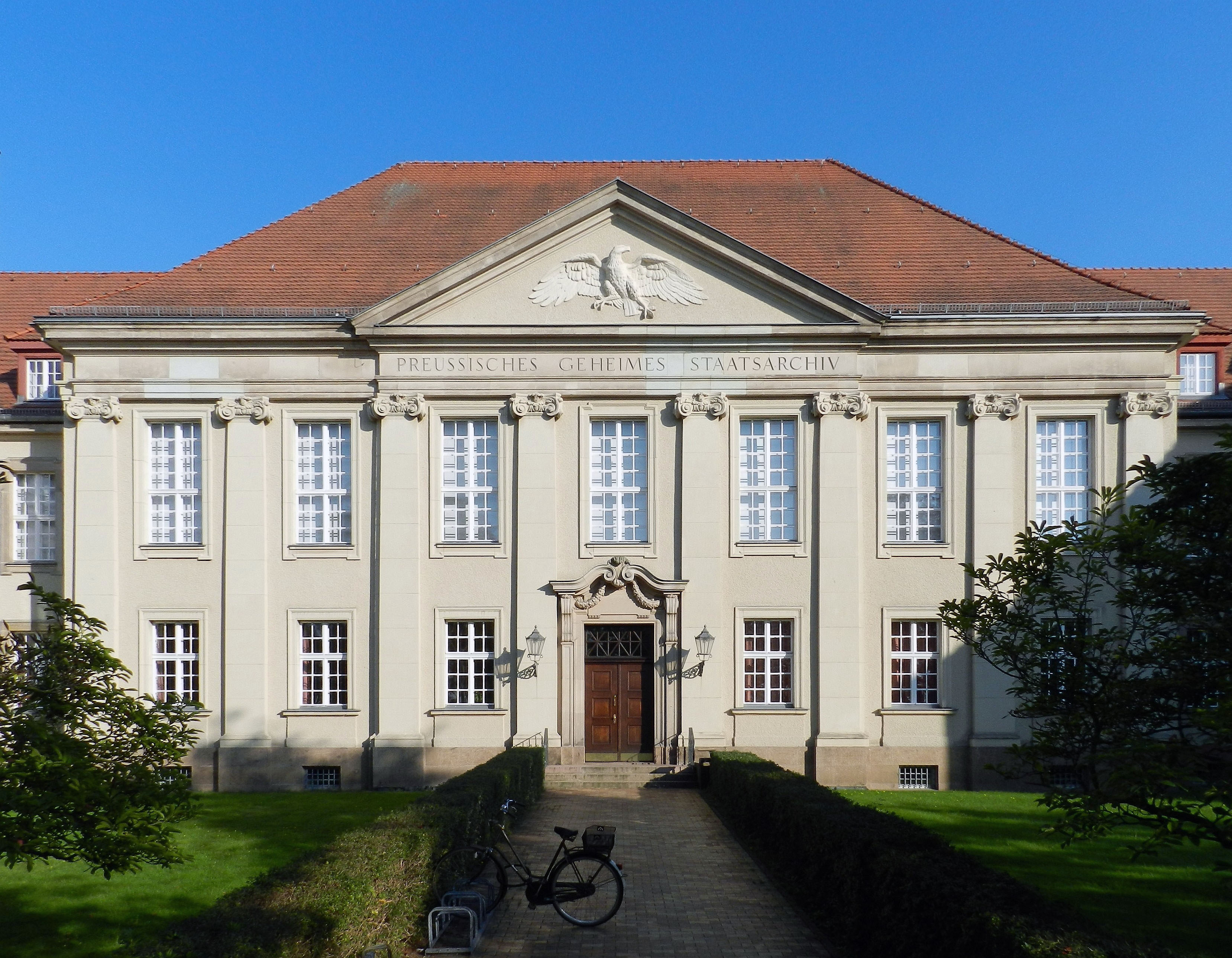
Main Entrance of the Secret State Archives Prussian Cultural Heritage Foundation

The Secret State Archives Prussian Cultural Heritage Foundation (German: Geheimes Staatsarchiv Preußischer Kulturbesitz or GStA PK) is an agency of the Prussian Cultural Heritage Foundation headquartered in Berlin, Germany. A Federal statutory body, it is one of the largest repositories of primary source documents in Germany and spans the history of Prussia, Brandenburg, the House of Hohenzollern and the Prussian Army. Insofar as the agency represents over 400 years of archival work of the former states of Brandenburg-Prussia, including their main roots in the Teutonic Knights, the Archives can be said to cover "nine centuries of European history between Königsberg and Cleves".

== Building ==
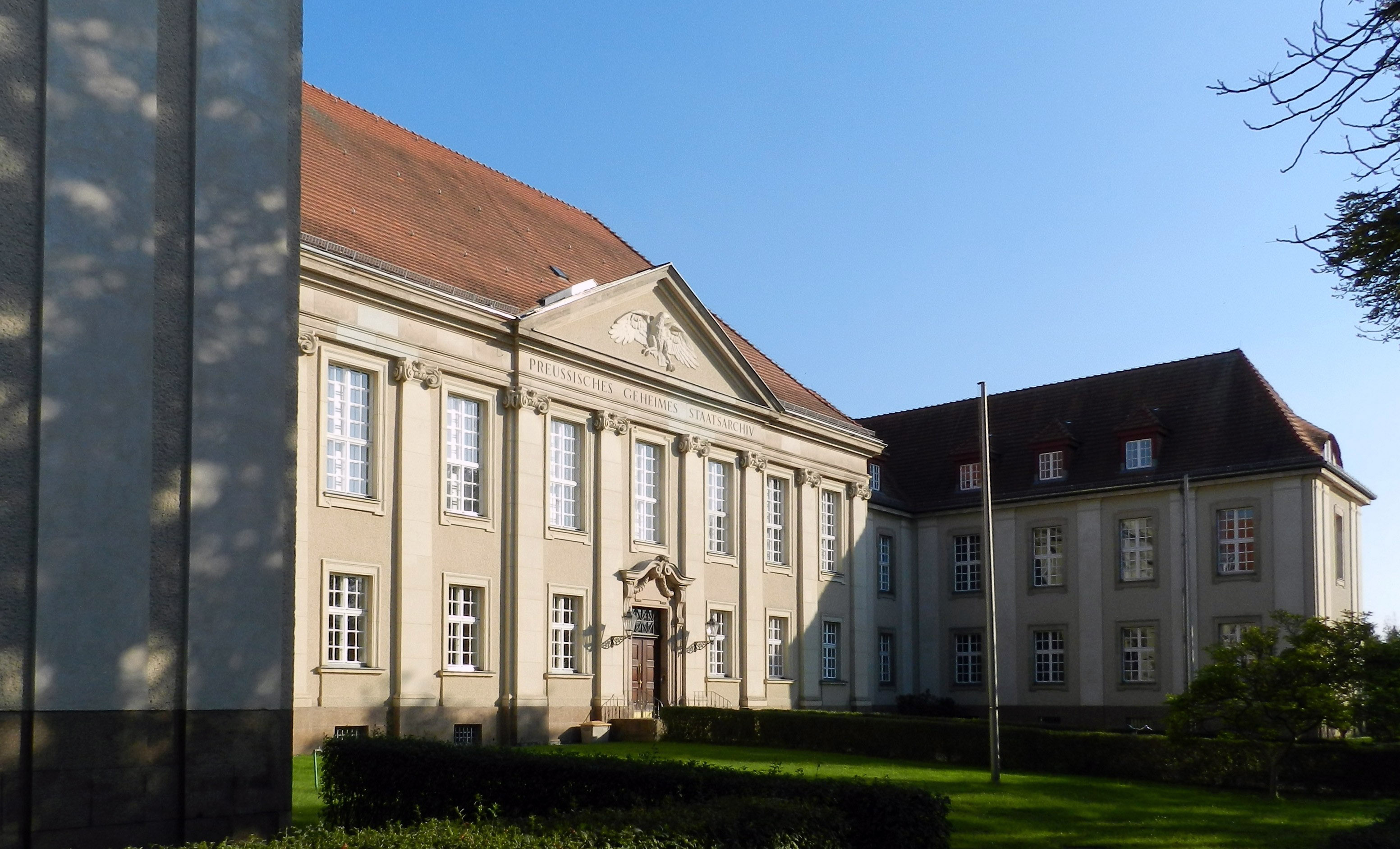
Berlin-Dahlem building in 2011

Originally located in the Berlin Palace, the Archive moved into a prestigious new building erected specifically for it in Berlin-Dahlem. It was built between 1914–1924 following a design by Eduard Fürstenau. The building was renovated and expanded in 1999. The address is Archivstraße 12–14, D-14195 Berlin, Germany.

== History ==
The origins of the Archives can be directly traced back to 1282, when a collection of official papers under the auspices of the Margrave of Brandenburg was first documented. Formal organization of the stocks occurred in 1468, and in 1598 the Elector of Brandenburg appointed Erasmus Langenhain "Registratura Archivorum" to bring systematic order to the sovereign's documents, official records and files. Today's GStA PK traces itself back to this professional tradition.

In the middle of the 17th century the holdings became a personal repository of the first King of Prussia under archivist Christoph Schönebeck and granted the honorific title "Privy State Archives". In 1803, the Archives were expanded with the addition of Prussian governmental, judicial and regional documents and renamed the "Prussian State Archives". Until 1883, when Brandenburg, then the only Prussian province without an own provincial archive, founded the Brandenburgian Provincial Archive, the Privy State Archives also collected all the records from that territorial and political entity. By 1901, the institution had developed precise standards for the preservation of public records that have had a pronounced effect on the archival profession.

During World War II, the majority of the holdings were evacuated to abandoned mines at Stassfurt and Schönebeck between 1943 and 1944 to protect them from Allied bombing. As the Soviet Army advanced on East Prussia, the Königsberg State Archives were evacuated to Göttingen.

After the war, holdings that wound up in the Soviet occupation zone were moved relatively unscathed to a newly created German Central Archive housed in Merseburg, East Germany. The original Dahlem headquarters building wound up in the US sector of Allied-occupied West Berlin. In 1946 it became the main archive for West Berlin's government and included partial stocks from the historic collection. In 1963, these came under the jurisdiction of the Prussian Cultural Heritage Foundation and the Archive was again named the "Privy State Archives". From 1978-1979 the Königsberg collection was relocated to Berlin. After German Reunification, from 1993 to 1994, the GDR Archives maintained in Merseburg were also brought back to Berlin and the historic record was again complete.

== Collection ==
Approximately 35,000 linear meters of archives with a library service of some 185,000 volumes and 200 periodical subscriptions. The archives include:

- Official papers of successive governments of Brandenburg-Prussia, including central administrative and judicial proceedings of institutions such as:
  - Prussian Royal Supreme Court
  - Prussian Ministry of Finance
  - Prussian Ministry of Trade and Industry
- Royal Archives of the Kingdom of Prussia and German Empire
- Archives of the House of Hohenzollern and other Royal Houses
- Proceedings and records of the Preußischer Landtag
- Prussian Military Archives to 1866/67
- Documentation of provincial authorities and traditions (especially the former eastern provinces of Prussia)
- Non-state provenance, especially Brandenburg-Prussian family archives
- Records of Masonic lodges and similar organizations
- Miscellaneous archives, such as Mining and Metallurgical records and a rich Maps collection
