= Archives department of Seine-Maritime =

Coordinates: 49°26′7″N 1°5′28″E

The Archives of Seine-Maritime is an archival repository in the department of Seine-Maritime, Normandy, France.

== History ==
The law of the 5th brumaire an V (26 October 1796) imposed the gathering of archives in the capital city of each department and stands as the foundation act of the Department archives in France. In the department of Seine-Inférieure (now Seine-Maritime) it took almost a century to create a unique repository.

As late as 1825 public archives were scattered in different sites in Rouen. The acquisition of a building located near the Préfecture eventually made the task of reunification possible. Under the impulse of Charles de Beaurepaire, Head of archives from 1851 to 1905, the building was enlarged in 1856 and 1896.

Charles de Robillard de Beaurepaire spent all his professional life as an archivist in the Seine-Inférieure Department until his retirement in 1905, so he had time to develop and enlarge the repository and the collections, time to process, arrange and describe a huge amount of archives. He was a great contributor to Norman history. Among others tasks, he also wrote and published the finding aids for the archives of secular clergy (including Rouen archbishop's archives, Rouen chapter house's archives, all the Rouen and Seine-Inférieure parish records) which took none less than 7 volumes (1868–1900), and which are still very useful and regularly used.

Beaurepaire also took care of the judicial archives and by 1895 he had cleared the Palais de Justice, Rouen main courthouse, of all its ancient records prior to 1790 and transferred them to the departmental repository: cleaning and processing this bulk of ledgers and records from the Parlement, the Chambre des comptes, the Cour des aides and other jurisdictions, indeed represented a very heavy task for him and his staff. In 1903 1500 notarial volumes or registers prior to 1686 were transferred to the repository.

With a capacity of 9,5 linear kilometers, "the most beautiful repository in France" (as it was then said) soon became too small to cope with the increasing flow of archives. Projects for a larger site were postponed by the breaking of World War II. The archives had to be removed from the repository, the most precious parts of the collections being transferred to rural castles in the department of Eure.

In spite of the bombings of Rouen the archives came out quite preserved.

In the 1950s an ambitious project for a new administrative center including a skyscraper specially designed to house the archives was launched and achieved. The "Archives tower" was dedicated in 1965. This building had a (then impressive) capacity of 36 linear kilometres on 27 stories.

But in the 1970s the ever-growing flood of archives produced by administrations (and also coming from private sources) made it clear that another storage facility would soon be needed. In 1981 the Department bought part of the old Fromage textile factory in Darnétal (industrial town east of Rouen). Between 1984 and 1996 the old factory was turned into a repository for archives, with a 27 linear kilometers capacity and its own reading room. It now stands as an important branch of the main repository, which is still located in Rouen (quai Jean Moulin).

== Status ==
The Departments have had a legal obligation to support financially the Department Archives service since 1838. The Department archives in fact remained a State service until the enacting of decentralisation laws (22 July 1983) which placed them under the authority of conseils généraux (County Councils) from 1 January 1986.

The Department archives are responsible for the preservation of final records produced by the State services in the Department and the Department services themselves, for the preservation of notarial records older than 100 years and records of small towns with fewer than 2000 inhabitants. In spite of decentralisation, Head of Department archives still keeps a scientific and legal control, on the State behalf, over public archives in the Department.

== Staff and organization ==
The archives of Seine-Maritime count four activities:

- The external intervention : relationships with the State and the Department services, with local communities and public establishments of Seine-Maritime regarding : current records management, archives collecting and processing, control of records disposal and preservation of historical archives.
- The Public Service provides reference and research assistance to users both in-house and long-distance; it is in charge of relationships with private collectors and potential donors, and of archives of private origin. The Public Service also manages the library sector.
- The Cultural and Educational Services is in charge of workshops and exhibitions especially designed for schools and the young public. Staff work with two teachers on special projects.
- The General Affairs Service supervises accounting, internal management, and the image processing and restoration units.

In December 2006 staff was composed of 55 agents, among them four state civil servants.

== Holdings ==
With more than 53 linear km of records, the Archives of Seine-Maritime are one of the most important provincial repositories in France. They received in particular the records of the ancient institutions of Normandy and the collections of the great local abbeys.

=== Archives of the ancient judicial institutions ===
Archives of the three main courts: The Echiquier (Exchequer) then Parlement (Supreme Court) of Normandy, Chambre des comptes et Cour des aides. The Exchequer created by the Dukes of Normandy for financial and then judicial matters became a sovereign court in 1499 and a Parlement in 1515. The records of the Exchequer and the Parlement cover four centuries from 1336 to 1790. Created in 1580 the Chambre des comptes of Normandy was sovereign in financial matters all over Normandy. The Cour des aides was the ultimate appeal court in fiscal matters.

Housed in the Palais de Justice these records were transferred to the Department Archives in 1867 and in 1895.

Apart from these sovereign courts the archives also hold records from the first level royal jurisdictions (called bailliages or vicomtés) and feudal jurisdictions owned by lords and barons (among them the feudal jurisdiction of Elbeuf which left important collections).

We can also mention the maritime courts which had power and jurisdiction over all maritime matters, called the amirautés (admiralties, for example the Dieppe and Le Havre admiralties) and the Court of appeal in these matters called Table de marbre (Marble Table). You can find there interesting records about British or Irish ships in cases where they had to report to an admiralty, for example in cases of shipwrecks.

=== Archives of the great Norman abbeys ===
Since the early Middle Ages, the collections of the monasteries have served as the best preserved archives, as monasteries were keen to preserve the original proofs of their properties and privileges. The collections of the great abbeys are among the oldest holdings (Fécamp, Saint-Ouen de Rouen, Jumièges, for example). Half of the 200 abbeys and priories of the Seine-Maritime that existed before the French Revolution have left records.

=== Other material ===
The records of the public notaries (tabellions), which cover a very long period of time include the records of Rouen notaries since 1360, which is quite exceptional in northern France.

Industrial and architectural archives. As a legacy of the industrial past of the Department the archives hold many records of factories and companies, especially those of textile factories (e.g. fonds Buquet, Fromage, Manchon frères, Roy frères, Schuhl et Hirsch, Stackler, and Tetlow). Also to be pointed out is the operation of preservation of the Havre Shipyards archives in 2000, which represent almost 12 000 items for the files (about 1 linear km) and about 60 000 technical large size drafts, blueprints and plans. The archives of 20th century architects who took part in the post-war Reconstruction of Rouen and the region are also an interesting and important part of the holdings (e.g. fonds Boucher, Chirol, Dussaux, Nicolau, and Robinne et Ropers).

Fonds de la Société libre d'Emulation de la Seine-Maritime (328 items or files). The aim of this society was to promote industry and commerce in the Department. It was active from the end of the eighteenth century to the fifties (1950). Very interesting archives for the industrial history of the Department in the 19th century, with a large collection of textile samples.

The Stackler factory archives (273 items). Records from the Stackler factory, specialised in the production of printed calico, established at Saint-Aubin-Épinay (1821–1903) in the east of Rouen. A lot of accounting records but interesting textile samples as well.
