= Cyprus State Archives =

- Interactive map of Cyprus State Archives
- 35.16553677346241°N 33.33898070726913°E
- Alternative name: Κρατικό Αρχείο
- Location: State Archives 38, Archbishop Makarios III street, 2407 Engomi, Nicosia, Cyprus
- Type: State
- Established: 1978
- Website: http://www.mjpo.gov.cy/mjpo/statearchive.nsf/

The Cyprus State Archives (Greek: Κυπριακά Κρατικά Αρχεία, romanized: Kypriaká Kratiká Archeía) are the national archives of Cyprus. They depend upon the ministry of justice and public order. They were established in 1972. They are based in Nicosia.

== Collections ==
The earlier material dates from the British Colonial period (1878-1960).

== Legislation ==
The first law that established the Public Archive was enacted in 1972 and the archive started its work in 1978, with a delay due to the Turkish invasion of Cyprus in 1974. In 1991 it was renamed from Public to State Archive. The 1991 is still in force with some modifications.

- Ο περί Δημοσίου Αρχείου Νόμος του 1972 (Ν. 40/1972)
- Ο περί Κρατικού Αρχείου Νόμος του 1991 (Ν. 208/1991)

== Publications ==
- Cyprus State Archive / Κρατικό Αρχείο Κύπρου. (2012). Kitchener 1878 – 1883 Architect of the Cyprus Land Survey / Αρχιτέκτονας της Χωρομέτρησης της Κύπρου. Λευκωσία: Κρατικό Αρχείο.
- Κυριακίδης, Χ., & Πιερή, Κ. (Eds.). (2023). Αρχεία στην Κύπρο. Οργάνωση - Προσδοκίες - Προοπτικές. Πρακτικά 1ου Επιστημονικού Συνεδρίου Κρατικού Αρχείου 7 Ιουνίου 2022. Λευκωσία: Κρατικό Αρχείο.

== See also ==
- National Library of Cyprus
