= St. Moritz Library =

Library in St. Moritz in Switzerland

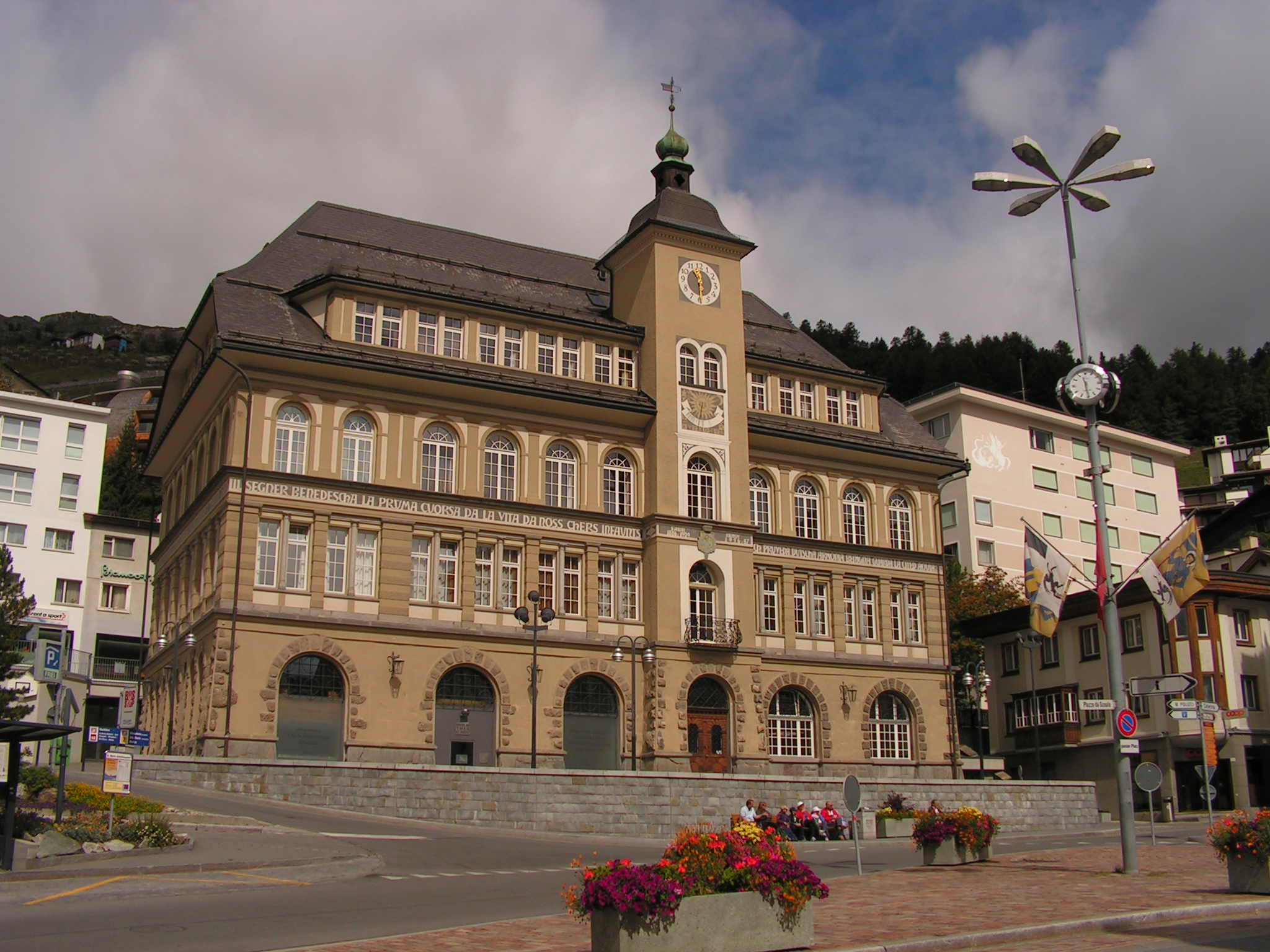
- 46°29′55″N 9°50′19″E

Bibliothek St. Moritz (in English St. Moritz Library) is a library in St. Moritz in Switzerland. It is divided into a "Leihbibliothek" and a "Dokumentationsbibliothek".

Located inside the old school building dominating the Plazza da Scoula in the town the library possesses over 7000 books written in a number of languages including German, Italian, French and English.

On the ground floor is the reception and lending area and the main hall of the library. This has a periodicals corner complete with audio stations to view or listen to other forms of media such as periodicals and newspapers, CDs, tapes and maps. Left of the main entrance is the children's library and at the rear are two quiet reading rooms for children and adult visitors. The larger adult reading room is often hired for lectures and seminars held in the town for various events.
