= Cantonal and University Library of Fribourg =

Library in Canton of Fribourg, Switzerland

Coordinates: 46.8064°N 7.1561°E

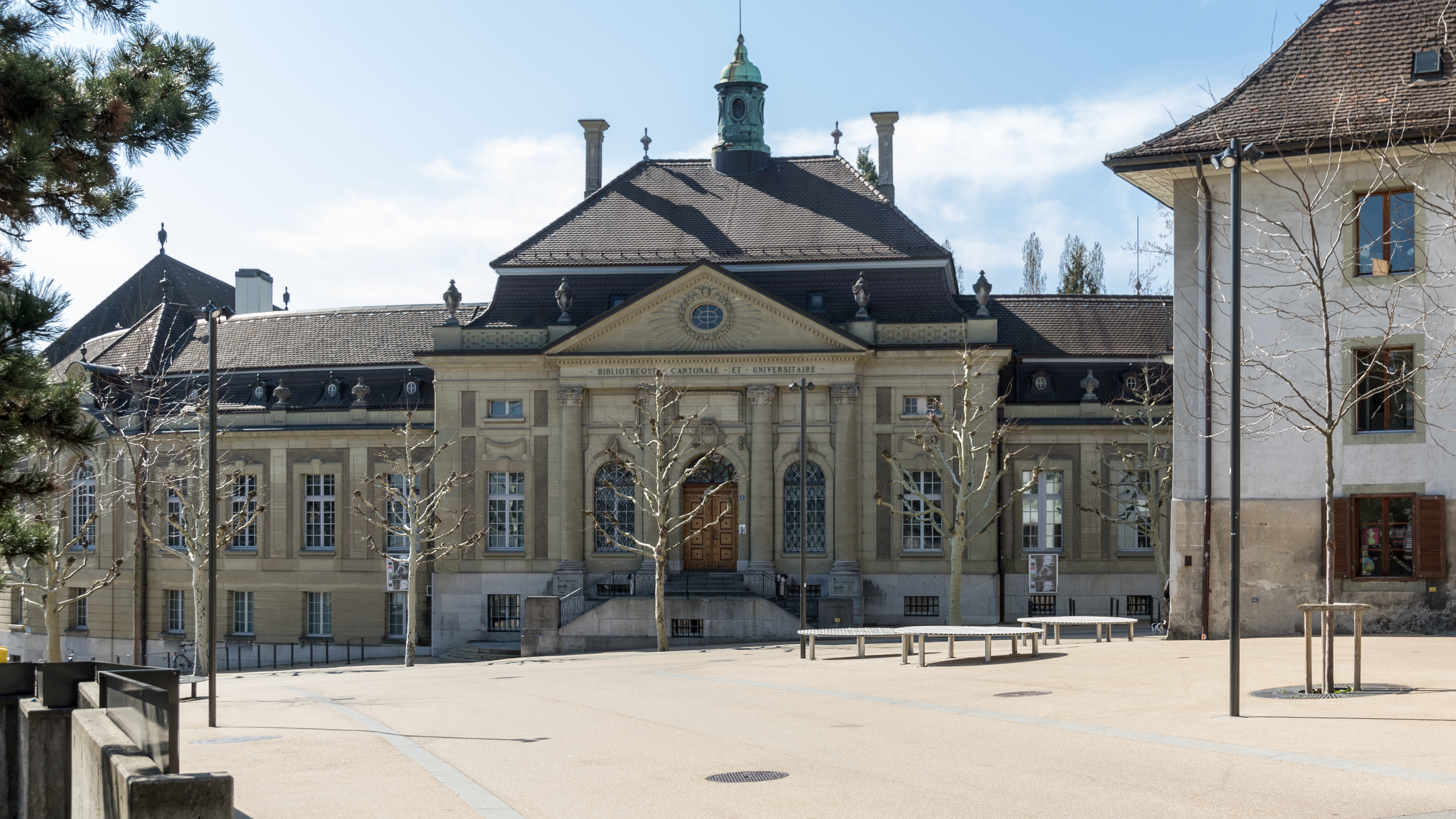
Cantonal and University Library of Fribourg building

The Cantonal and University Library (German: Kantons- und Universitätsbibliothek (KUB), French: Bibliothèque cantonale et universitaire (BCU), also known as the Bibliothèque cantonale et universitaire de Fribourg (BCUF)) is a cantonal and university library that located in the Canton of Fribourg, Switzerland. BCU founded in 1848, comprises a central library and decentralized libraries, notably at the University of Fribourg. All libraries are managed according to the same library principles and guidelines. BCU is part of the Directorate of Education, Culture and Sport (EKSD) of the Canton of Fribourg and is affiliated to the Office of Culture.

Its mission is to contribute to the development of the intellectual and cultural life of the canton, both for the university community and for the general public. It was part of the Western Switzerland Library Network (RERO) until 2020. It has been a member of the Swiss Library Service Platform (SLSP) network since 2020 and works closely with the other libraries in the canton.

== Legal basis ==
According to the cantonal law on the cultural institutions of the state, the BCU has the task of:

- to acquire, record, preserve and make accessible to the public the information media required for general education and scientific research;
- to compile a Fribourg documentation accessible to the public and to keep an associated bibliography;
- to ensure the obligatory distribution of printed materials and recordings and to preserve the collections;
- to contribute to the development of the general public library system in the canton.

== History ==
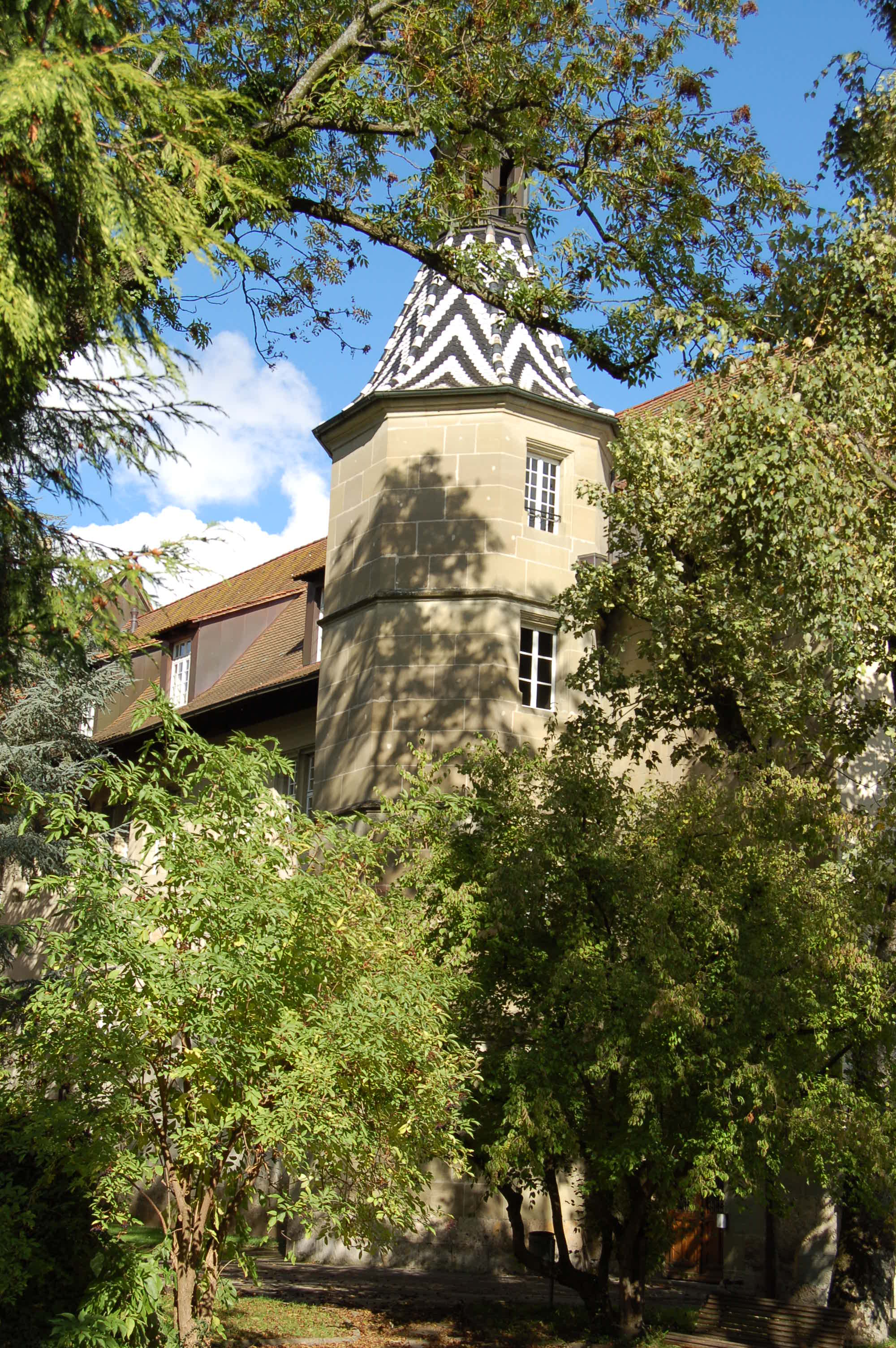
New building of College Saint Michel in Fribourg

The public cantonal library was founded in 1848. The collections came from the libraries of the Jesuit College of St. Michael (Collège Saint-Michel) and the various abolished orders and monasteries such as the Cistercians of Altenryf. They were housed in the former library of the College of St. Michael, a room measuring 8 × 12 meters. The first director, Abbé Meinrad Meyer, published the first volume of the printed catalog in 1852.

Due to a lack of space, plans for a new library building were made several times in the following decades. The founding of the University of Fribourg and the emergence of seminary libraries exacerbated the lack of space. Following a feasibility study and the purchase of the land by the canton in 1905, the building was constructed on the Winkler property next to the Kollegium and behind the Konvikt Albertinum. The Bernese architects Wilhelm Bracher and Friedrich Widmer planned an entrance building with two side wings and a six-storey stacks building in the neo-baroque style. The architect in charge of construction was Léon Hertling.

In 1909, the library officially became the "Cantonal and University Library" (Bibliothèque cantonale et universitaire, BCU) and on June 11, 1910, the inauguration of the new library building on Rue Joseph-Piller took place. Pope Pius X donated a facsimile of the Codex Barberianus by Giuliano da Sangallo to the BCU.

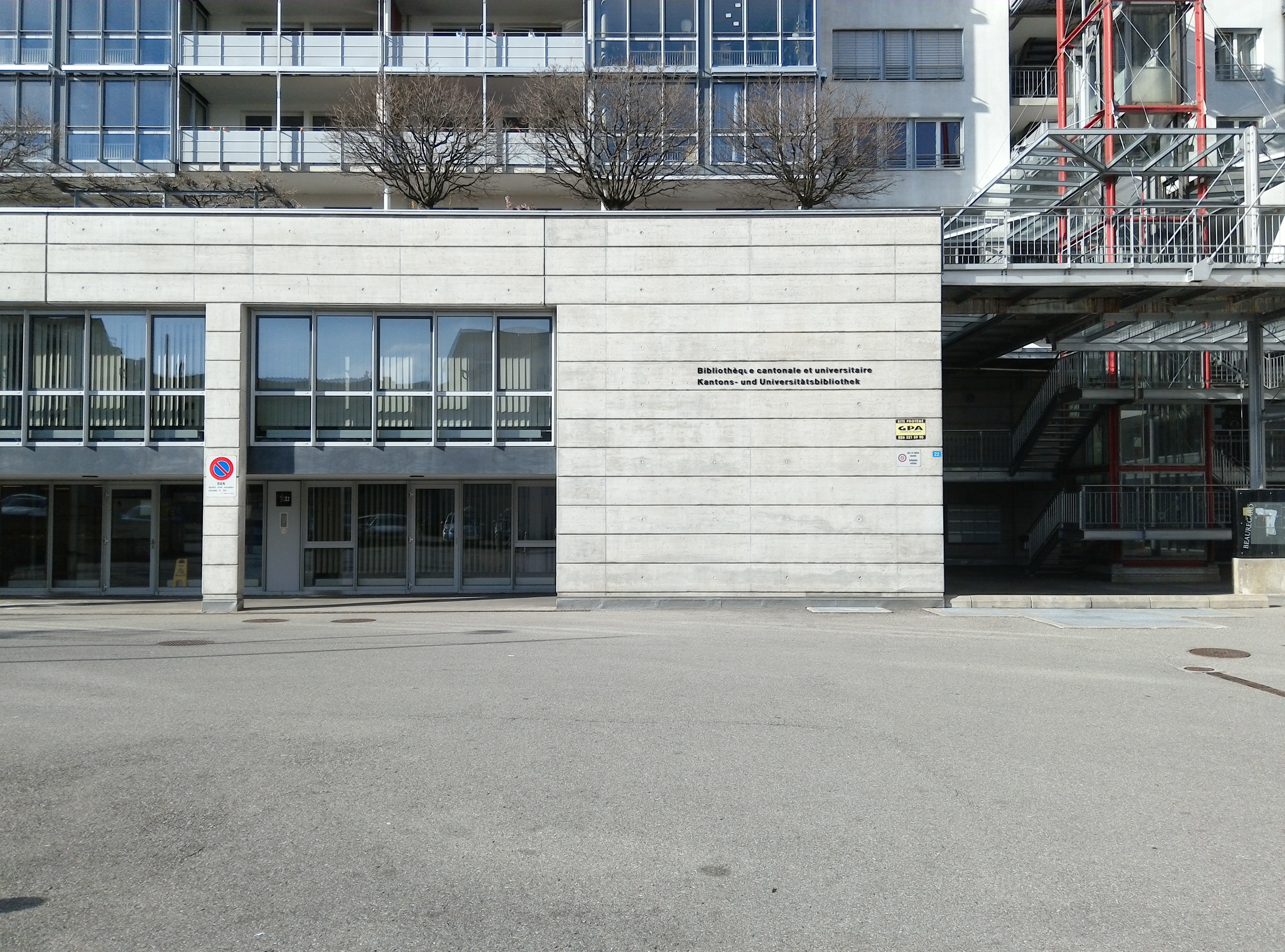
Beauregard branch (rue de la Carrière 22) of the Cantonal and University Library (BCUF) of Fribourg, Switzerland.

In 1941, the Miséricorde university building complex was inaugurated, in which several seminary libraries were set up. The BCU building became too small due to the growth of the university. It was extended between 1970 and 1975 according to plans by the Basel architect Otto Senn with a contemporary ensemble. The façade of the east wing was retained, the west wing became a catalog hall with an adjoining media library and a new study hall was built behind the stacks building. The stacks in the basement were enlarged and the lending system was automated with a conveyor belt. The extension was inaugurated on May 13, 1976.

In 1977, 20 seminary libraries became the Interfaculty Library for History and Theology (BHT). In 1984, the computerization of the BCU's services began and it joined the network of libraries in French-speaking Switzerland and Ticino (RERO). In 1989, the Fribourg Media Center was integrated into the BCU. The first volume of the ongoing Fribourg Bibliography was published in 1990 and the BCU website was launched in 1995.

Swiss Library Service Platform (SLSP) logo

In 2002, part of the holdings of the BCU headquarters were moved to the new Beauregard branch. According to a concept approved by the Grand Council in 2001, the head office at 4 and 6 Rue St-Michel was also to be expanded with a new building for the open access area and user workstations, and the existing premises were to be renovated.

On December 9, 2020, the BCU moved from the RERO library network in French-speaking Switzerland and Ticino to the Swiss Library Service Platform (SLSP) network. This harmonizes the user accounts, search portals, loan periods and fees of 470 academic libraries in Switzerland for registered users.

== Collection ==
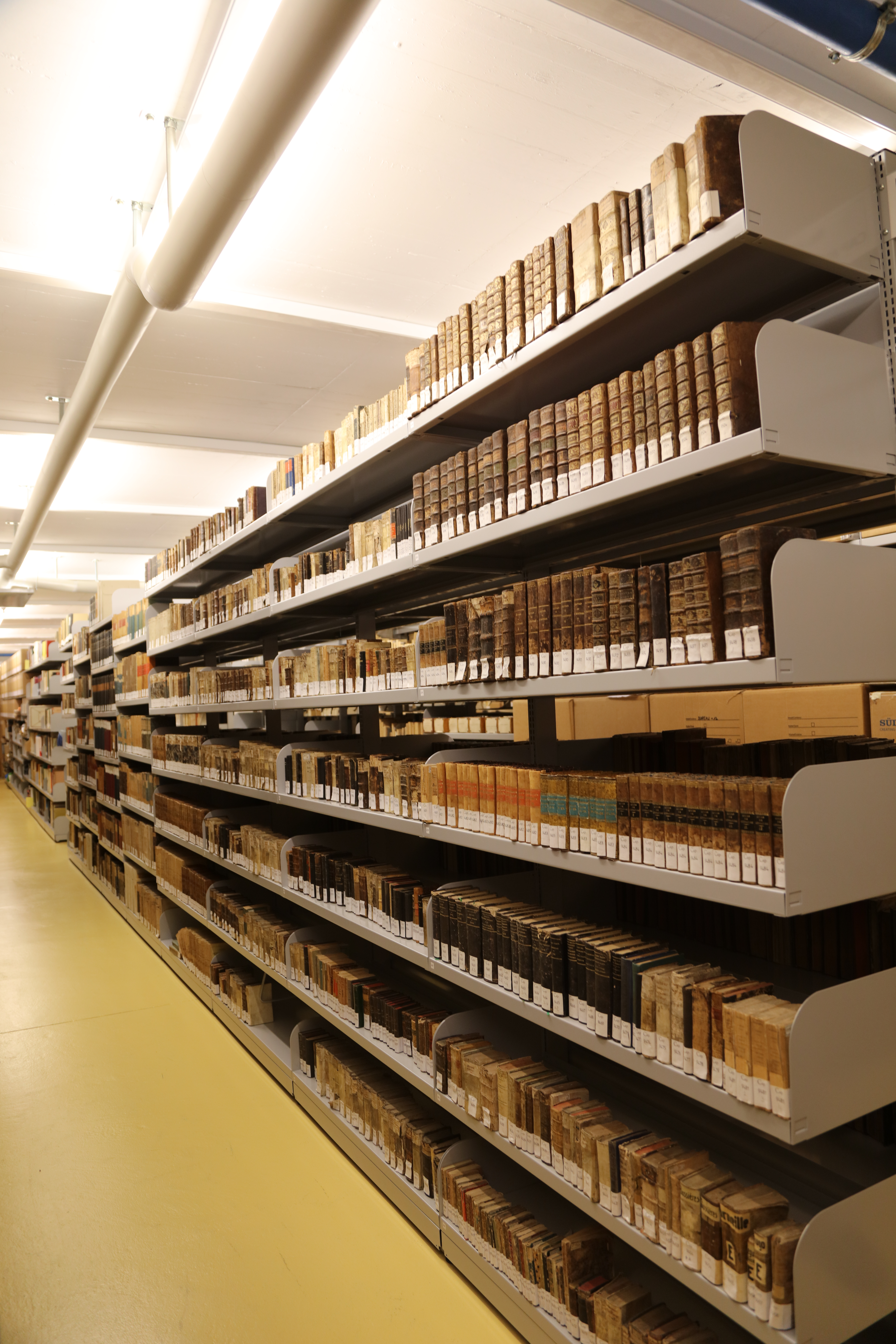
Book collection of BCUF

The BCU houses and makes available approximately 3.9 million documents and 800,000 electronic documents, including:

- 705 522 e-books (across multiple platforms)
- 88 135 electronic journals
- 224 databases
- 2300 manuscripts (including 185 before 1500)
- 620 incunabula
- 138 nachlass

== List of directors ==
The following personalities succeeded one another at the head of the institution:

- 1848-1870: Meinrad Meyer
- 1870-1897: Jean Gremaud
- 1897-1905: Charles Holder
- 1905-1916: Max de Diesbach
- 1916-1925: François Ducrest
- 1925-1942: Gaston Castella
- 1942-1958: François Esseiva
- 1958-1973: René de Wuilleret
- 1973-1984: Georges Delabays
- 1984-2002: Martin Nicoulin
- 2002-2020: Martin Good
- 2020-: Angélique Boschung

== Bibliography ==
- Alain Bosson, dans Urs B. Leu, Hanspeter Marti et Jean-Luc Rouiller, [« Répertoire des fonds imprimés anciens de Suisse »], vol. 1 : Kantone Aargau bis Jura, Zürich, Georg Olms Verlag, 2011 (ISBN 978-3-487-14584-6), p. 279–289.
- Service des biens culturels du canton de Fribourg (éd.) : Bibliothèque cantonale et universitaire Fribourg : histoire d'un bâtiment centenaire, Fribourg 2010.
