= National Archives of Iceland =

Coordinates: 64.1423°N 21.9066°W

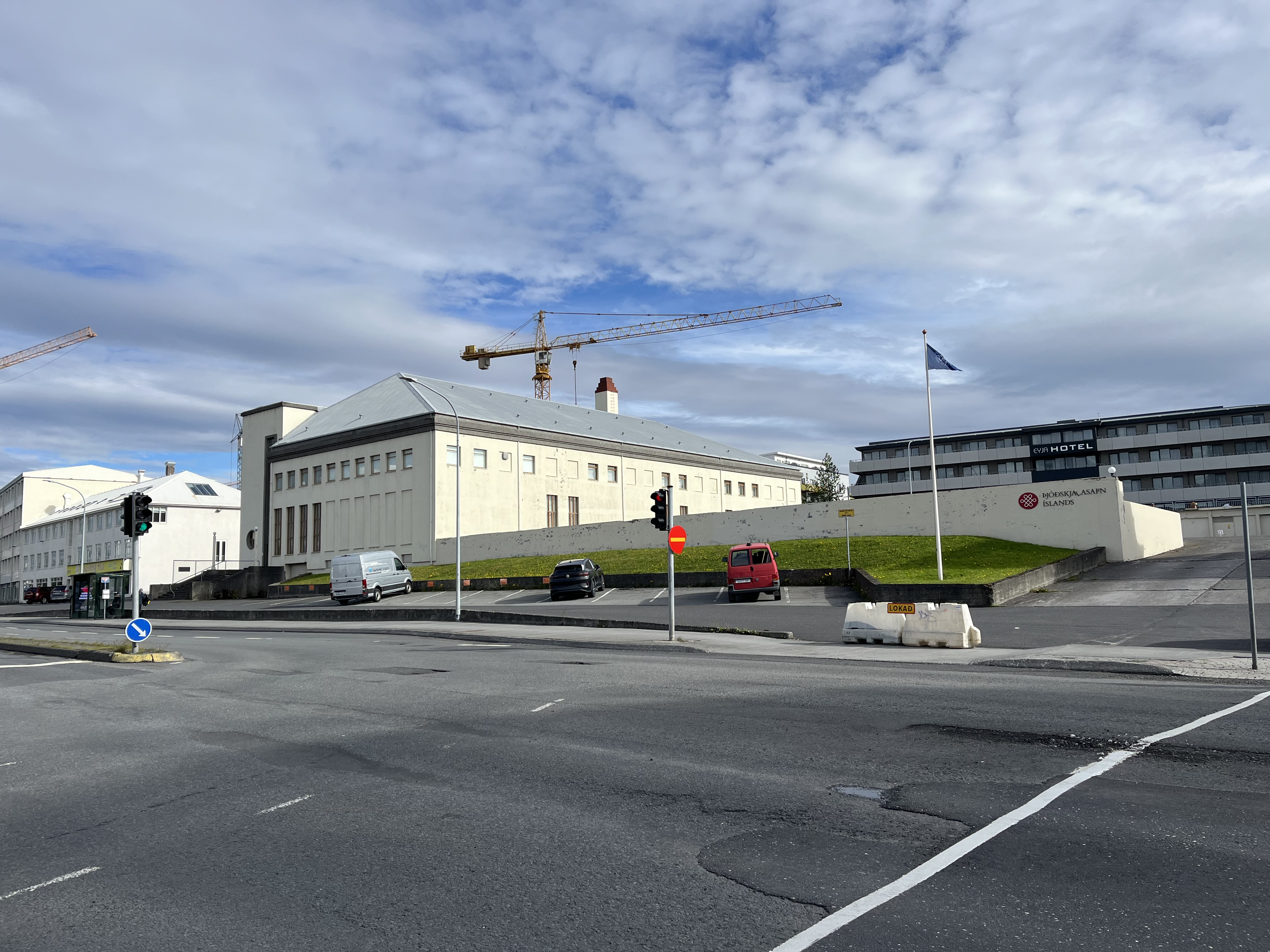

Agency overview
- Formed: April 3, 1882; 144 years ago
- Headquarters: Laugavegur 162, IS-105 Reykjavík, Iceland.
- Employees: 25+
- Website: skjalasafn.is

The National Archives of Iceland (Icelandic: Þjóðskjalasafn Íslands [ˈθjouðˌscaːlaˌsapn ˈistlan(t)s]) is the national archive of Iceland, located in Reykjavík. The National Archives, holding materials on Icelandic history from the era of the sagas in the 12th century to present, contributes greatly to historical research on the rights and role of Icelandic society.

== History ==
Founded in April 1882 by the Danish appointed governor (landshøvding) of Iceland, Hilmar Finsen. The National Archives of Iceland (NAI) drew its material mainly from governmental archives. In the beginning, the Archives were located in the attic of the Reykjavík Cathedral, which was vacated when the National Library of Iceland and the National Museum of Iceland had been moved to the new Parliament Building (Alþingishús). This move provided appropriate facilities to organize and preserve all of the archival materials acquired from various government departments. Since the move to the Cathedral loft, the Archives had three subsequent moves. First they joined the National Library of Iceland and National Museum of Iceland in the Parliament Building in 1900. In 1908, the Archives moved to a new building on Hverfisgata (Safnahúsið). In 1987, they moved to their current location at Laugavegur 162.

Jón Þorkelsson, the first national archivist, was appointed in 1900, where he served the role for 24 years.

The National Archives' size and the facilities have grown greatly since its founding. Functioning independent of each other, the various departments at the Archives previously had little coordination. The improved facilities and expanded staff has improved this cooperation.

With a current staff of over 25, the Archives now holds over 40,000 meters of shelf space.

== Appraisal and disposal of records ==
Guidelines on appraisal and disposal of records were first introduced to the National Archives of Iceland in 1900. These initial guidelines stated that an archivist will first consult the governor when records are determined to be unnecessary and ready for disposal. The governor would then make a final decision on these records and provide guidance for future disposal. These initial policies did not provide information on the qualities of records that were fit for disposal, or for appraisal.

=== National Archives Act of 1985 ===
With the new National Archives Act, passed in 1985, policies regarding appraisal or records were established. This act designated which government offices and institutions should deposit their records in the National Archives, and also that the National Archives can receive private records. With this act, appraisal of records is now placed on the record creators and is expected to occur prior to acquisition by the National Archives. Guidelines regarding the disposal of records were also defined. These policies established the National Archives' role as the authority on records management for Iceland.

The National Archives of Iceland has published handbooks with appraisal and disposal standards for organizations that wish, or are required to, deposit their records in the Archives. These handbooks include forms for following appraisal and disposal rules, which must be completed by an organization and submitted to the National Archives for approval.

Appraisal guidelines focus on the preservation of records for legal and security reasons, as well as for research value. The appraisal form presents several considerations to determine the value or need for the records in question:

- Whether the records are original, or are copies
- Whether the records are also held (as originals or copies) by others within the organization
- Whether the records are also held by those outside of the organization
- Whether the same information can be found in other records at the organization
- How much is the collection of records growing each year
- If, and at what age, the records can be disposed of

== Role of the Archive ==
The National Archives of Iceland functions under the Minister of Education, Science, and Culture. The Archives' mission focuses on archives and records management for documents received from institutions and government departments. Collections of paper documents are received by the National Archives when they reach 30 years in age. Electronic data is accepted when it is five years in age. The National Archives expands to receive regional collections when a local archival repository is not available. The Archives also sets policy regarding document management for state institutions and access for institutions and the public.

The National Archives contains:

- State archival collections
- Documents from government officials and departments, from the time of Reformation in the mid-16th century, to the present (including church, census, court, tax, and mortgage records, official correspondence, and legal documents)
- Private archival collections from individuals or corporations

Private and corporate collections are also received by the National Archives. When receiving these collections, the National Archives works with the donor to conduct descriptive work and preservation, and define access restrictions, to ensure long-term access.

=== Archival storage ===
With the National Archives Act of 1985, the Archives assumed a more official role as the authority on records management. This resulted in the Archives expanding to new storage facilities to house government and institutional collections. However, in October 2018, the Archives reached capacity in these storage facilities and has been forced to temporarily stop receiving government records until storage is expanded. While the expansion has received its initial funding, approval for the construction has not yet been granted. The government is renting temporary storage space for any additional records, in the meantime.

== Structure ==
The National Archives of Iceland includes three departments:

- Administrative and Finance - This department manages finances for the Archives, as well as office administration and personnel.
- Acquisition and Preservation - The department handles the acquisition of paper and electronic documents, archival processing of these materials, and performs conservation and preservation work. This department also provides guidance to government bodies on records management.
- IT and Public Service - The department works to provide user services, both in the reading room and through the website. This department also manages the Archives' print and online publications.

The National Archives of Iceland also promotes archival science by collaborating with the University of Iceland to provide archival instruction.

== Users and access ==
The collections at the National Archives of Iceland are available to researchers, as well as government and institutional staff in search of archival records on their institution or guidance on document management. Private citizens also have access in the National Archives for property records and genealogical research, through population and church records. The reading room is open to the public on weekdays, throughout the year. Digital copies can also be ordered from the Archives for a fee. From the website for the National Archives of Iceland, users can search for available collections within the Archive.

== National Archivists ==
#	National Archivist	Took office	Left office	Tenure length
1	Jón Þorkelsson	1900	1924	23–24 years
2	Hannes Þorsteinsson	1924	1935	10–11 years
3	Barði Guðmundsson	1935	1957	21–22 years
4	Stefán Pétursson	1957	1968	10–11 years
5	Bjarni Vilhjálmsson	1968	1984	15–16 years
6	Ólafur Ásgeirsson	1984	2012	27–28 years
7	Eiríkur G. Guðmundsson	2012		13–14 years
8	Hrefna Róbertsdóttir	2012	Incumbent	13–14 years
