= Swiss Social Archives =

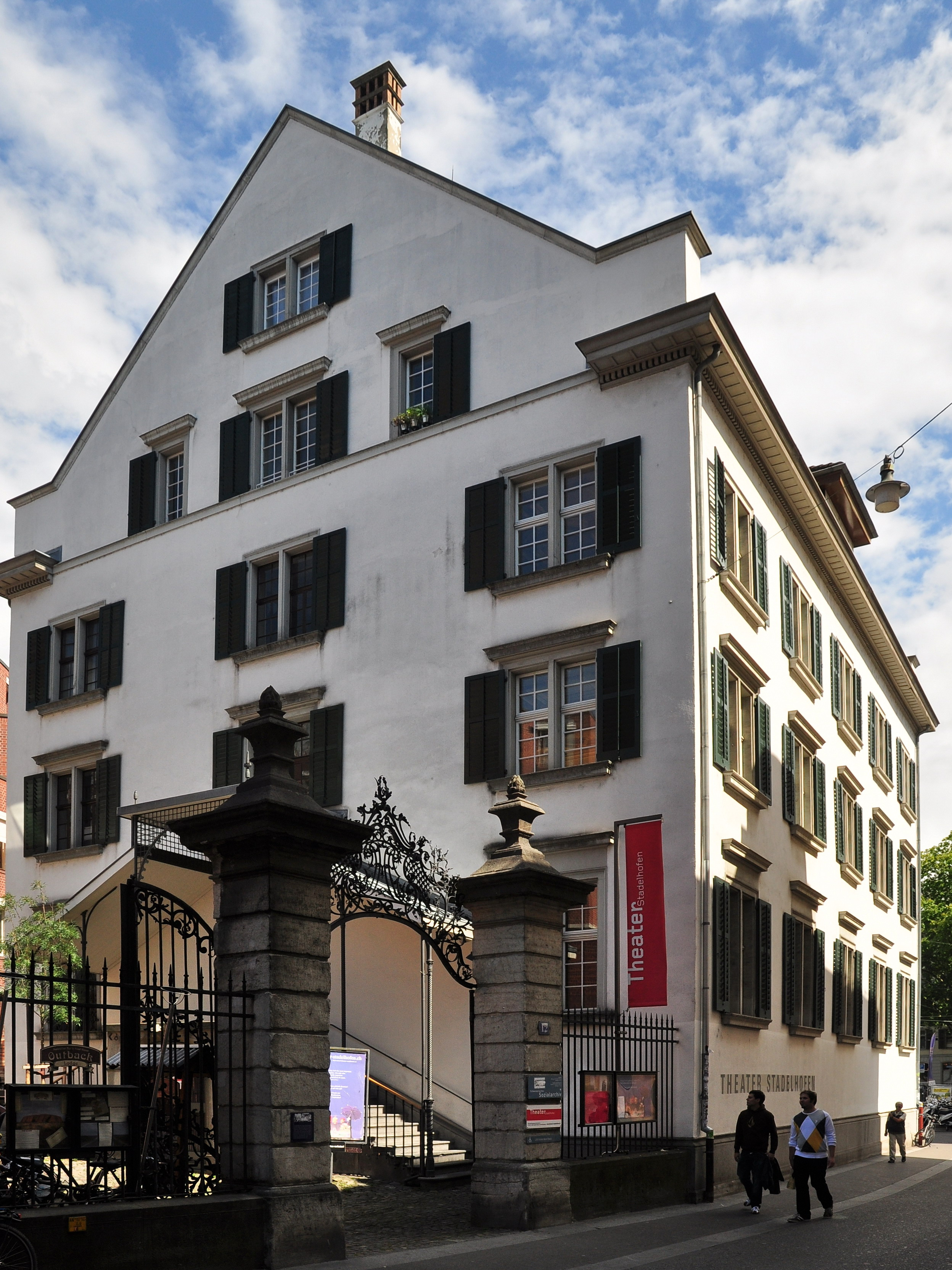
- Interactive map of Swiss Social Archives
- 47°22′01″N 8°32′51″E
- Location: Zurich
- Established: 1977
- Website: Official website

The Swiss Social Archives (German: Schweizerisches Sozialarchiv, French: Archives Sociales Suisse) in Zurich is a historical archive, an academic library, a collection of documentation and a research facility specialising in social issues and social movements. The Swiss Confederation recognizes the archives as the country's leading research facility for social issues and social movements. The Social Archives run their own research endowment fund, the Ellen Rifkin Hill Foundation. The SSA play an important role in communicating scholarship to the broader community. They have convened several exhibitions, published essay collections on Swiss social history and conduct lecture series, presentations and information sessions. The archives work with Swiss secondary and tertiary educational institutions, archives and libraries and with similar institutions abroad. The SSA are a founding member of the International Association of Labour History Institutions (IALHI).

== Organization ==
Run by an independent association funded by the Swiss Confederation, the Canton of Zurich, the City of Zurich and other sources, the archives employ about 20 historians, archivists, and librarians. The SSA's director is Christian Koller.

== History ==
The Swiss Social Archives were founded in 1906 by Paul Pflüger, a social reformer, politician and pastor from the working-class Zurich district of Aussersihl. Originally known as the Centre for Switzerland's Social Literature and inspired by the Musée social in Paris, their aim was to document social questions. Early visitors included emigrants from Germany and Russia, notably Lenin and Trotsky. During the interwar period, antifascist refugees from Italy and Germany frequently visited the reading room, and in the 1940s the archives assumed their present name. The reading room became a popular meeting place for Eastern European refugees from the Cold War. In 1974 the Swiss Confederation recognised the archives as a research facility, and ten years later the archives moved to their present home at the Sonnenhof.

== Literature ==
- Jacqueline Häusler: 100 Jahre soziales Wissen: Schweizerisches Sozialarchiv, 1906-2006. ed. Swiss Social Archives. Schweizerisches Sozialarchiv, Zurich 2006.
- Arbeitsalltag und Betriebsleben: zur Geschichte industrieller Arbeits- und Lebensverhältnisse in der Schweiz. ed. Swiss Social Archives. Rüegger, Diessenhofen 1981, ISBN 3-7253-0140-9. 2nd edition 1982.
- Urs Kälin: Fixierte Bewegung? Soziale Bewegungen und ihre Archive, in: Arbido 3 (2007). pp. 74–77.
- Christian Koller: Bibliotheksgeschichte als histoire croisée: Das Schweizerische Sozialarchiv und das Phänomen des Exils, in: Rafael Ball/Stefan Wiederkehr (eds.): Vernetztes Wissen - Online - Die Bibliothek als Managementaufgabe. De Gruyter, Berlin 2015. pp. 365–392.
- Christian Koller: Digitales Sozialarchiv: Was bisher geschah. In: Sozialarchiv Info 1 (2018). pp. 12–15.
- Christian Koller: Weder Zensur noch Propaganda: Der Umgang des Schweizerischen Sozialarchivs mit rechtsextremem Material. In: LIBREAS. Library Ideas 35 (2019).
- Christian Koller: Gesellschaftlicher Wandel als Sammelauftrag: Das Schweizerische Sozialarchiv. In: Arbido 2 (2020).
- Christian Koller: Vor 115 Jahren: Die Gründung des Sozialarchivs im »Kosakensommer«. In: Sozialarchiv Info 3 (2021).
- Karl Lang: 75 Jahre Schweizerisches Sozialarchiv, in: Nachrichten VSB/SVD 57 (1981). pp. 152–157.
- Stefan Länzlinger: Schweizerisches Sozialarchiv – Die Abteilung Bild + Ton, in: Rundbrief Fotografie, N.F. 75 (2012).
- Hanspeter Marti: Schweizerisches Sozialarchiv, Zürich. In: Urs B. Leu et al. (eds.). Handbuch der historischen Buchbestände in der Schweiz, vol. 3. Hildesheim 2011, pp. 317–325.
- Fritz N. Platten, Miroslav Tucek: Das Schweizerische Sozialarchiv. Schweizerisches Sozialarchiv, Zurich 1971.
- Eugen Steinemann, Eduard Eichholzer: 50 Jahre Schweizerisches Sozialarchiv 1907–1957: Festschrift zum fünfzigjährigen Bestehen und zur Einweihung des neuen Sitzes des Schweizerischen Sozialarchivs in Zürich. Schweizerisches Sozialarchiv, Zurich 1958.
- Anita Ulrich: Le Schweizerisches Sozialarchiv: Stratégies de conservation et de valorisation des archives du mouvement ouvrier, in: Alda De Giorgi/Charles Heimberg/Charles Magnin (eds.): Archives, histoire et identité du mouvement ouvrier. Geneva 2006. p. 92–101.
- Anita Ulrich/Konrad J. Kuhn: Soziale Bewegungen und internationale Solidarität: Archivbestände und offene Forschungsfragen, in: Sara Elmer/Konrad J. Kuhn/Daniel Speich Chassé (eds.): Handlungsfeld Entwicklung: Schweizer Erwartungen und Erfahrungen in der Geschichte der Entwicklungsarbeit. Basel 2014. pp. 231–251.
- Vassil Vassilev: Das Schweizerische Sozialarchiv in neuem Gewand. In BuB – Forum Bibliothek und Information 11/2016. pp. 690.
