= Australian Trade Union Archives =

Australian online archive

Australian Trade Union Archives is an online resource for archived and present-day material related to industrial organisations in Australia. It went online in 2002.

The site is a joint project of the Australian Science and Technology Heritage Centre of the University of Melbourne, the Noel Butlin Archives Centre of the Australian National University, the School of Information Management and Systems at Monash University, and the archives of the University of Wollongong.
