= Soviet archives =

The State Archives of the Soviet Union have been inherited by the post-Soviet states. They include:

== National and special archives ==
- National Archives of Armenia
- National Archive Department of Azerbaijan
- National Archives of Belarus
- National Archives of Estonia
- National Archives of Georgia
- Lithuanian Special Archives
- State Archive of the Russian Federation
- State Archive Service of Ukraine

== Lists of archives ==
- List of archives in Armenia
- List of archives in Azerbaijan
- List of archives in Estonia
- History of archives of Lithuania
- List of archives in Russia
- List of archives in Ukraine
