= Voskan Yerevantsi =

Armenian book publisher (1614–1674)

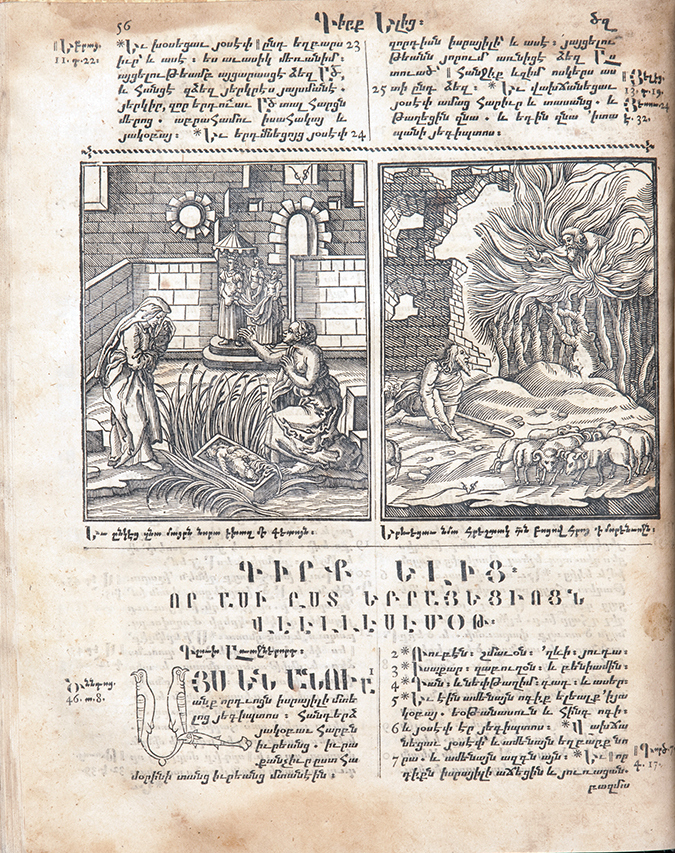
Book of Exodus, edited by Voskan Yerevantsi, Amsterdam, 1666.

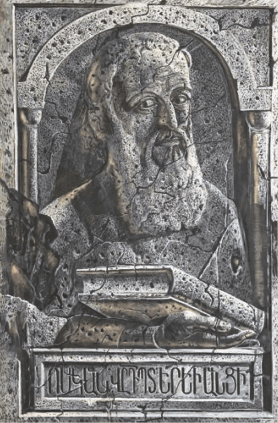
Yervand Kochar's 1946 artistic depiction of Voskan

Voskan Yerevantsi (also spelled Oscan; Armenian: Ոսկան Երեւանցի, lit. 'Voskan of Yerevan'; 1614–1674) was one of the first Armenian book publishers during the years 1640–1666. He published the first Armenian Bible in Amsterdam in 1668, which is believed to be one of the best samples of old Armenian printing. His printing press was the longest-running Armenian publisher in the seventeenth century. It existed for 26 consecutive years in four different countries, printing nearly 40 works.

== Biography ==
Voskan Yerevantsi was born in January 1614 in New Julfa, the Armenian suburb of the royal Safavid capital of Isfahan. The names of his parents were Toros (also known as Teodoros) and Goharaziz. They were natives of Yerevan who were resettled in New Julfa during the deportations of Shah Abbas I in 1604–1605. Voskan was expected to become a long-distance merchant like his brothers, Hovhannes and Avetis, but he instead pursued a religious career and enrolled in Khachatur Kesaratsi's school in New Julfa. At the age of fifteen, he went to Etchmiadzin to continue his education. There, he studied with the Dominican missionary Paolo Piromalli, who taught him Latin, philosophy, geometry, astronomy and grammar. Voskan created a Classical Armenian grammar textbook modeled on a Latin one. He also translated a number of works from Latin. As a result of his association with Piromalli, Voskan eventually converted to Catholicism. According to Sebouh Aslanian, this raised the suspicion of his fellow Armenian churchmen, but it allowed him to travel extensively. From 1638 to 1641, he traveled to Poland with Piromalli. He was made the superior of Ushi Monastery near Etchmiadzin in 1642, a position he held for many years.

In 1662, at the suggestion of Catholicos Hakob IV Jughayetsi, he went to Europe to print the Bible in Armenian. He first went to Livorno, then to Rome, where he tried in vain to gain permission from the Vatican to receive permission to print the Armenian Bible in an Italian city. In Livorno, he made a deal with three Julfan Armenian merchants, who provided him with the capital needed for the printing of the Bible. In 1665–1666, he moved to Amsterdam in the Dutch Republic, where he took over the printing press that Matteos Tsaretsi had established in 1660. The printing press had recently been purchased by Voskan's brother Avetis. Voskan immediately began work on the printing of the Bible. It was finally published on 13 October 1668. Five thousand copies were produced in total. He printed twelve titles in Amsterdam until 1669, when he moved the printing press to Livorno. The exact reason for the move is unknown. It has been suggested that the Catholic Voskan did not wish to continue printing in non-Catholic Amsterdam, or that he was experiencing financial difficulties and left to evade his creditors. Apparently, Voskan's three business partners had broken their agreement and refused to pay for the printing expenses, which caused him to go into debt. Livorno was also closer to the largest market for Armenian books, the large Armenian community of Constantinople.

Voskan received permission from Louis XIV to establish his printing press in Marseilles, on the condition that the printed works would not go against Catholic doctrines. In 1672, he arrived in Marseilles, where he was suspected by some of being a false Catholic who printed heretical works. Voskan, facing bankruptcy, began a business partnership with Father Tadeos (Thadée) Hamazaspean, also from New Julfa. According to Aslanian, Hamazaspian was probably a secret agent for the Vatican. Soon after concluding their agreement, Hamazaspean sued Voskan in the local courts on charges of heresy, interrupting the operation of the printing press. Voskan died in Marseilles on 4 February 1674. His printing press was taken over by his nephew, Soghomon Levonian (Salomon de León), who continued to litigate the lawsuit begun by Hamazaspian. The lawsuit greatly hindered the operation of the printing press. Soghomon died in 1684, leaving the printing press to his widow, Marguerite de Chave. The press was shut down in 1686 and later moved to Constantinople in 1695 with a new owner.

== Printing press ==
Voskan Yerevantsi's printing press (1660–1686) was the longest-running Armenian publisher in the seventeenth century. It existed for 26 consecutive years in four different countries, printing nearly 40 works. It printed the first Armenian Bible (1666–1668). Voskan's Bible was based on the 1295 version belonging to King Hethum II of Cilician Armenia, with some changes to bring it closer to the Vulgate.

Voskan's printing press also printed the first book in the vernacular Armenian of the time, a work on mathematics called Arhest Hamaroghut’ean (The art of arithmetic, Marseille, 1675). Unlike previous Armenian printing presses, it printed books in much greater print runs, often in the thousands and as many as five thousand for some books, like the Bible. Most earlier Armenian presses printed in the range of 100–500 copies, with a few printing 1000–3000. It was the first Armenian printing press to print a large number of books on non-religious topics, such as Arakel of Tabriz's Book of Histories (Amsterdam, 1669). It was the first to significantly increase the print runs of books. Historian Rafayel Ishkhanian credits Voskan's printing press with solving the long-term shortage of books among Armenians during this period.

== General references ==
- Ishkhanian, Rafayel (1982). "Ոսկան Երևանցի [Voskan Yerevantsi]". Soviet Armenian Encyclopedia Vol. 8 (in Armenian). Yerevan. p. 623.
- Armenology Research National Center: The Armenian Book 1512-1920
- Garegin Levonyan, The Armenian Book And The Printing Art, Yerevan, 1946.
- Knarik Korkotyan, The Armenian Printed Book In Constantinople, Yerevan, 1964
