= Khnko Aper Children's Library =

Children's library in Yerevan, Armenia

Coordinates: 40°11′2″N 44°31′1″E

National Children's Library named after Khnko Aper
- Խնկո Ապոր անվան ազգային մանկական գրադարան
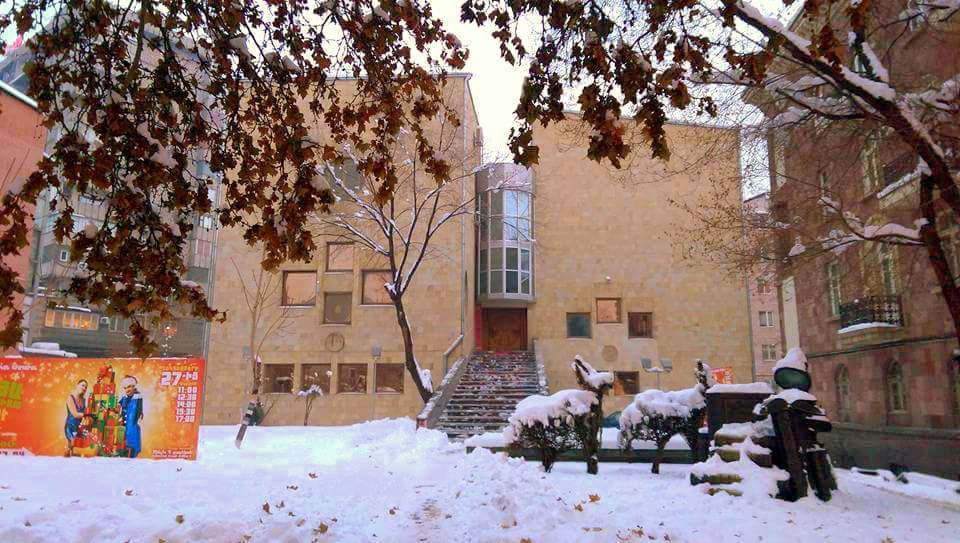
- The Children's library
- Location: Yerevan, Armenia
- Type: National library for children
- Established: 1933

Collection
- Size: 0.5M items

Other information
- Website: natchildlib.org

The National Children's Library Named After Khnko Aper (Armenian: Խնկո Ապոր անվան ազգային մանկական գրադարան, romanized: Khnko Apor anvan azgayin mankakan gradaran) is a national children's library in Yerevan, Armenia. It was founded in 1933 and renamed after the famous children's writer Khnko Aper (Atabek Khnkoyan) after his death in 1935. Since 1980, the library has been located on Teryan Street in Kentron district, next to the Swan Lake of the Opera House. The architects of the library building were Levon Ghulumyan and Rouzan Alaverdyan. The library is home to a collection of 500,000 books. It has a large reading room with a capacity of 100 seats.

The library has three more sections for Chinese, Iranian, and German literature.

== Gallery ==
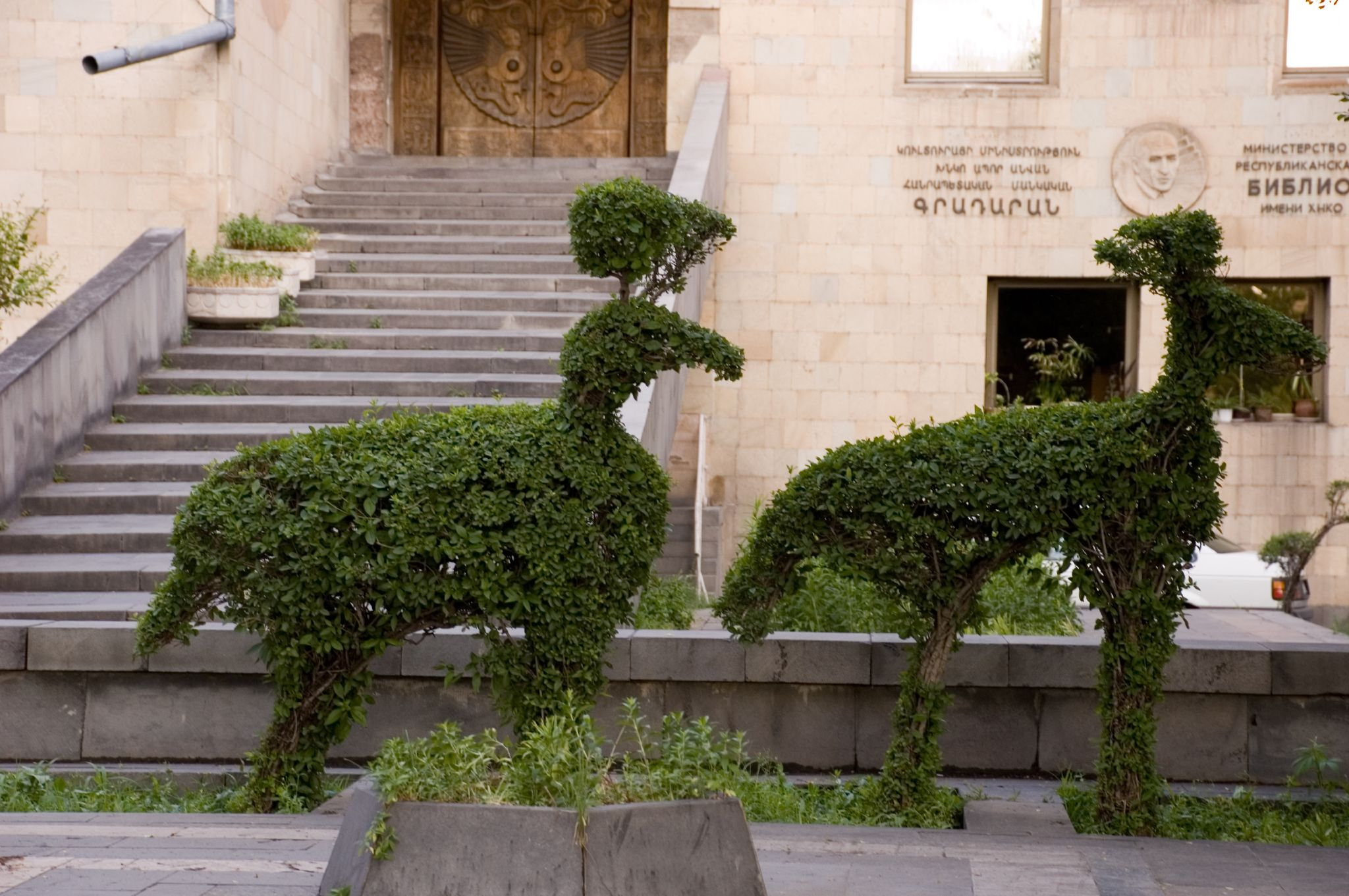
The main entrance to the library

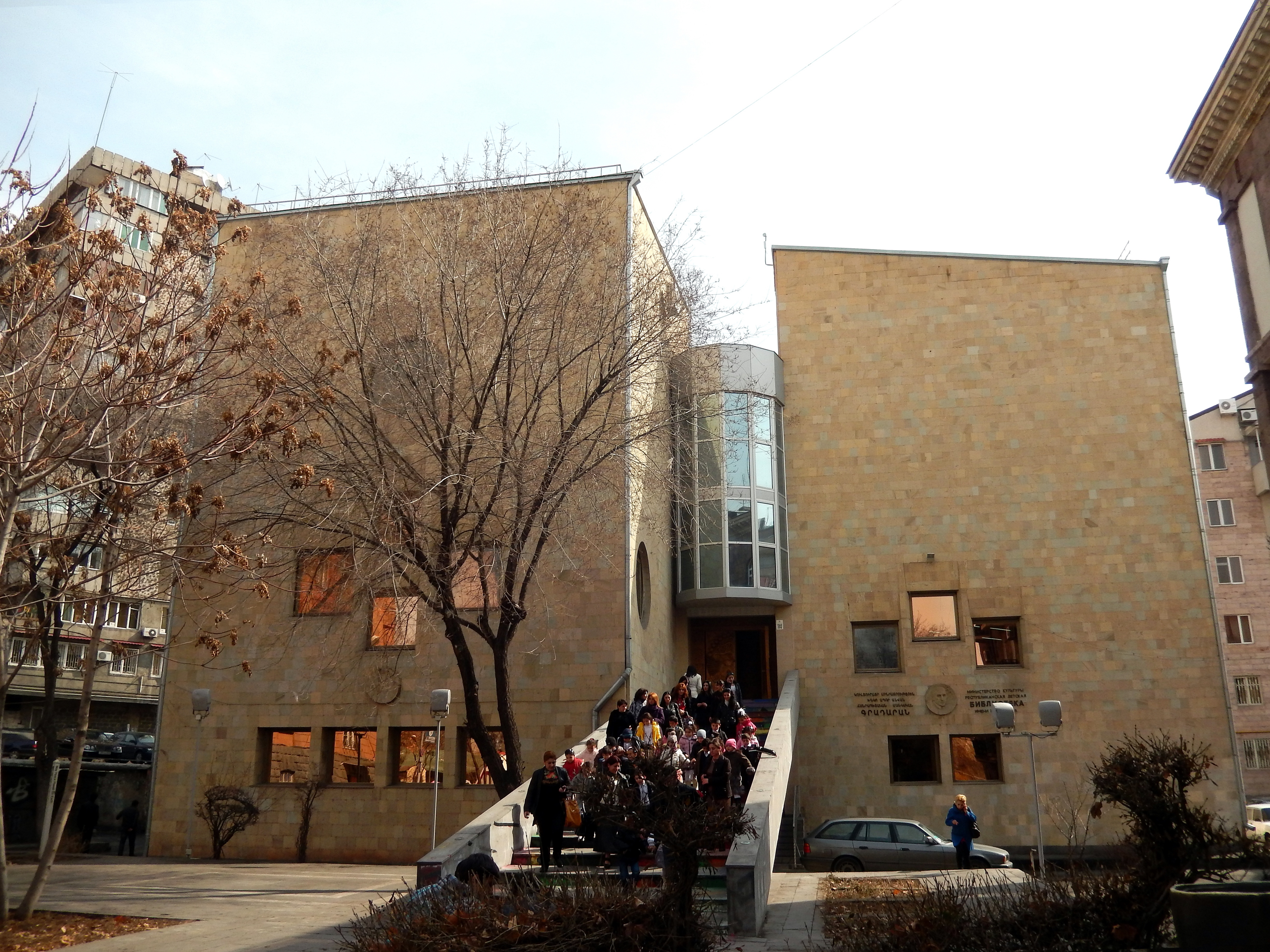
The library building

== See also ==
- National Library of Armenia
- Avetik Isahakyan Central Library
- List of libraries in Armenia
