= European Network of Official Authorities in Charge of Secret Police Files =

European Network of Official Authorities in Charge of Secret Police Files – an international organization bringing together archival institutions from Central and Eastern European countries, established in December 2008. Its aim is to coordinate and exchange experiences in the field of safeguarding, providing access to, and researching the records of former communist secret services.

== History ==
The network was established in 2008 by seven Central European institutions managing the records of former communist security bodies: the Bulgarian Committee on Disclosure of Documents and Announcing Affiliation of Bulgarian Citizens to the State Security and the Intelligence Services of the Bulgarian National Army (COMDOS), the Czech Institute for the Study of Totalitarian Regimes and the Security Services Archive (USTR and ABS), the German Federal Commissioner for the Records of the State Security Service of the former German Democratic Republic (BStU) (today’s Bundesarchiv Stasi-Unterlagen-Archiv), the Historical Archives of the Hungarian State Security (ABTL), the Institute of National Remembrance – Commission for the Prosecution of Crimes against the Polish Nation (IPN), the Romanian National Council for the Study of the Securitate Archives (CNSAS), and the Slovak Nation’s Memory Institute (ÚPN). In 2021, the Albanian Authority for Information on Former State Security Documents (AIDSSH) joined the network as a member.

The network has five associate members (observers): the National Archives of Estonia, the National Archives of Latvia, Lithuanian Special Archives, the Ukrainian Institute of National Memory, and the Archives of the Republic of Slovenia.

== Mission ==
The general aim of the network is to create a common forum for the exchange and transfer of information concerning the archives governed, legal regulations applied to the access and research of the former communist security bodies, historical-political education and public relations, and relevant research. A common goal of the network is mutual support in the fulfilment of these tasks. The members of the network are working to guarantee the full independence of archival research, as well as to prevent any kind of political instrumentalization of the archival holdings. The idea that initially guided the founders was to simplify procedures related to the possibility of conducting research and exchanging documents, but over time cooperation has taken on a more complex character. The Network’s activities are primarily aimed at raising public and political awareness of dealing with the past. An important element of these activities is educational and popularization work.

== Working Methods of the Network ==
The network conducts annual conferences at which the management bodies of the institutions involved discuss important issues associated with their functions and the overall process of coming to terms with the past in their countries. In this process, the pan-European dimension of these issues is intended to play a particularly significant role.

The country which chairs the network (on a rotating basis) serves as the host of the conference. This annual conference is accompanied by public events which are to serve to increase public awareness of issues related to this review process.

The proceedings of the annual conference are documented and published in an appropriate way.

The Network is chaired by the Institute of National Remembrance (Poland) for the 2024-2025 term.
