= City Central Library after Avetik Isahakyan =

Public library in Yerevan, Armenia

Coordinates: 40°10′41″N 44°30′59″E

Avetik Isahakyan Central Library «Ավետիք Իսահակյանի անվան Կենտրոնական գրադարան>>
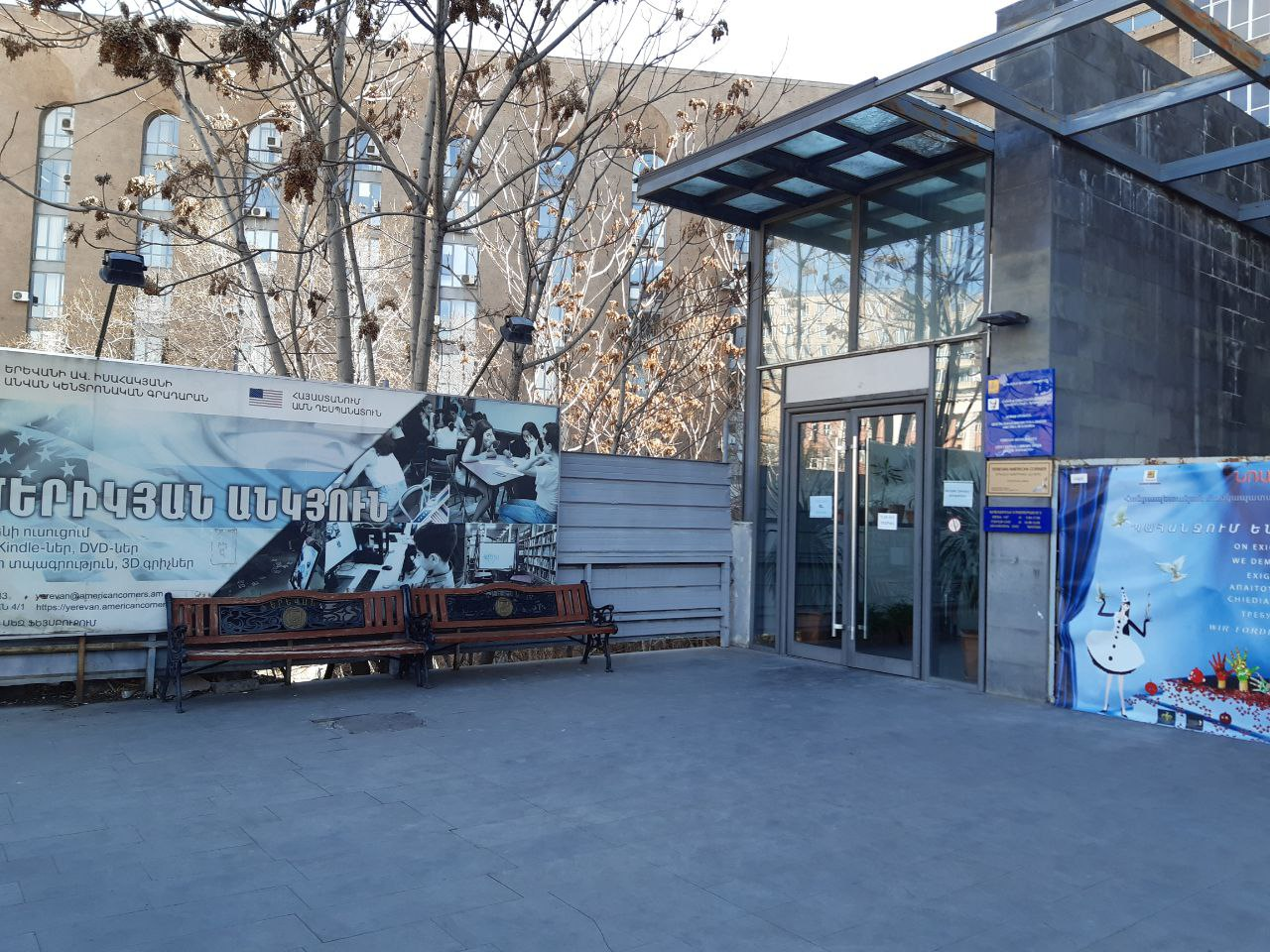
- Location: Yerevan, Armenia
- Type: Public library
- Established: 15 August 1935

Other information
- Director: Hasmik Karapetyan
- Website: http://www.isahakyanlibrary.am

Avetik Isahakyan Central Library, officially Yerevan Municipality “City Central Library after Avetik Isahakyan” communal non-commercial organization (Armenian: Երևանի Քաղաքապետարանի «Ավետիք Իսահակյանի անվան Կենտրոնական գրադարան» ՀՈԱԿ) is a public library in Yerevan, Armenia. It was founded in 1935 at 26 Amiryan Street, with T. Barkhudaryan as its headmaster. In 1955, it was renamed after the famous poet Avetik Isahakyan on the 80th anniversary of the master. Today the library's main building is located at 4/1 Nalbandyan street, with 10 branches located on Baghramyan, Sayat-Nova avenue, Tigran Mets, Komitas and Kievyan avenues and Moskovyan, N. Zaryan, Atoyan, Rustaveli, Norq 5th and Mamikonyants streets. Readers can use free wi-fi service, online library, electronic book databases. Readers are able to purchase modern Kindle E-readers to read books in electronic format. Isahakyan library is also a place for meetings and a cultural corner for literary discussions and various cultural events focusing on the themes preservation of the nation and its traditions, the importance of the books and writing. The library serves up to 1500 visitors daily.

== See also ==
- National Library of Armenia
- Khnko Aper Children's Library
- List of libraries in Armenia
