= Armenian printing =

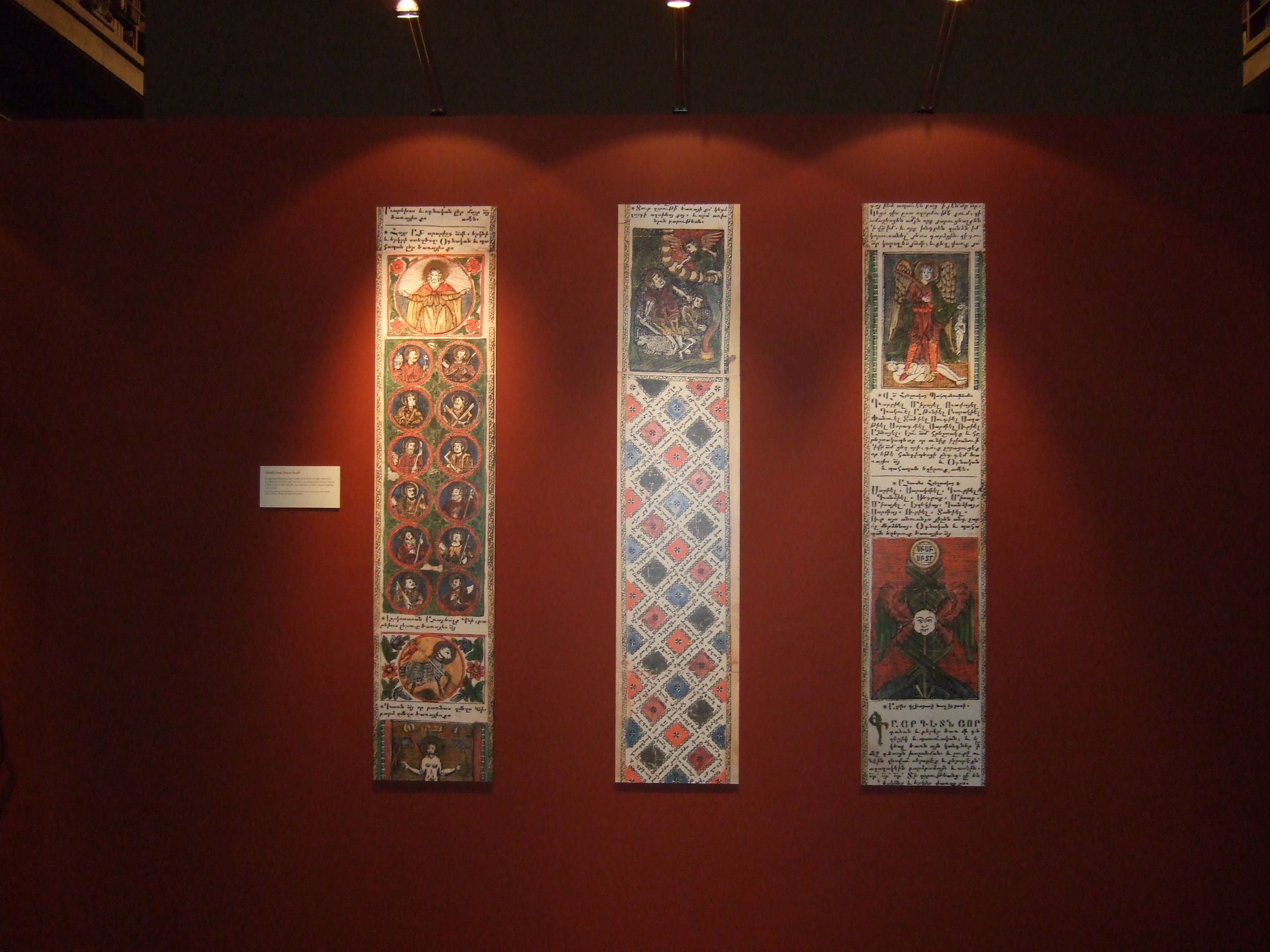
The Armenian Literary Tradition exhibit at the Library of Congress in 2012, dedicated to the 500th anniversary of Armenian printing

After the introduction of movable printing type to Europe by Johannes Gutenberg in Germany (circa 1439), Armenians from throughout the diaspora began to publish Armenian-language books. The first book which had Armenian letters was published in Mainz (Germany) in 1486. The first Armenian book to be published by the printing press was Urbatagirq—Book of Friday prayers—which was published by Hakob Meghapart in Venice in 1512.

== History ==
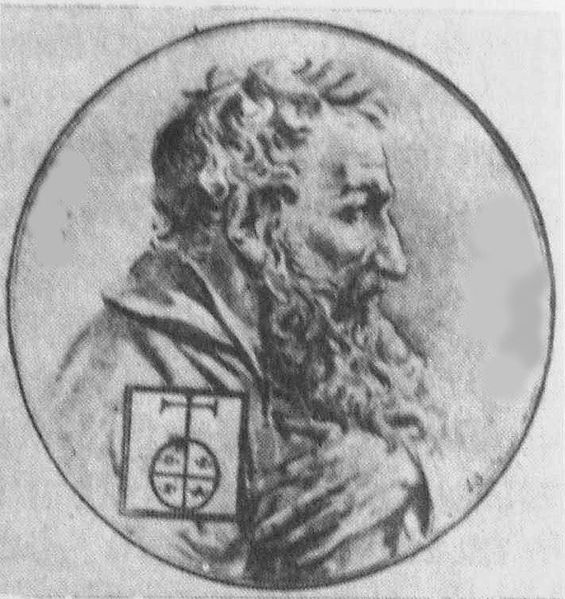
Hakob Meghapart, publisher of the first printed Armenian book

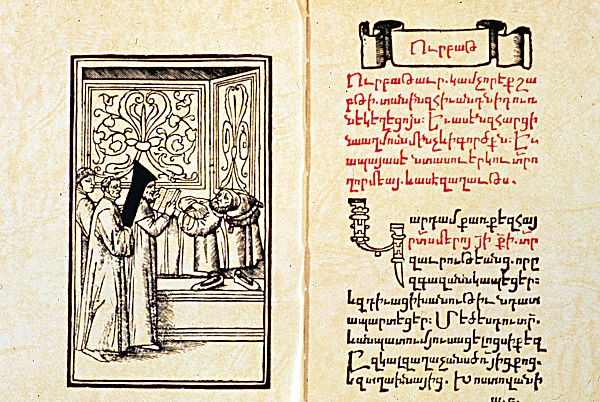
Urbatagirq, the first book printed in Armenian in 1512

In the 16th century there were published 31 books, in 17th century – 164 and in 18th there were 824 Armenian books printed.

- The first Armenian book was published by Hakob Meghapart in 1512 in Venice (Italy). The book was called «Ուրբաթագիրք» ("Urpatakirk", "Friday Book").
- Abgar Dpir Tokhatetsi published an Armenian book in Constantinople (Ottoman Empire) in 1568.
- The first Armenian printing house in Persia was established in New Julfa (Isfahan, Iran) in 1636. The first book to be published in this printing house was «Սաղմոսարան» ("Saghmosaran", "Psalter"); it was published in 1638 by Khachatur Kesaratsi, while the first Persian book in Persia was published 192 years later in 1830.
- The first Armenian printing house in Armenia was established in Vagharshapat in 1771 and the first book was called «Զբօսարան Հոգեւոր» ("Zbosaran Hogevor", "Spiritual walking"); it was published in 1772 by Simeon I of Yerevan.
  - The first Armenian printing house in Yerevan was established in 1876 by Z. Hakobyan. In 1880 E. Ter-Grigoryan became director of the printing house and worked there until the 1910s. The first book printed in the printing house was E. Ter-Grigoryan's "Trchnik" ("Small Bird") collection.
- The first Armenian printing house in Russia was set up in Saint Petersburg in 1781. Grigor Khaldariants' had type sent from London, and under the sponsorship of the Primate of Armenians in Russia, Bishop Hovsep Arghutian, he edited the first Armenian book to be published in the Tsarist realm, «Տետրակ այբբենական» ("Tetrak aybbenakan", "ABC Reader") in 1781. He then printed works such as «Բանալի գիտութեան» ("Banali Gitut'ean", "The Key to Science"), «Շաւիղ լեզվագիտութեան» ("Shavigh Lezvagitut'ean", "Linguistic Guide"), and «Ընդհանրական»("Endhanrakan", "Encyclical Letter") by Nersés Shnorhali.

=== 20th century ===
After the sovietization of Armenia, Yerevan becoming the center of the Armenian printing, where in 1921 organized by the State Publishing House. It assumes the functions of editing and organization publications. Makes its political, artistic, scientific, publications for children with relatively large circulations. Separated from the State Publishing House publishing house “Luys” (Light), specialized mainly in the publication of textbooks. In 1964 from publishing Armenian State Publishing House (HayPetHrap) was renamed “Hayastan” (Armenia). In 1976 have been separated from the last publishing “Sovetakan Grogh” (Soviet writer), which it published in the most artistic and literary works. Academy of Science of Armenian SSR published a monograph of scientific and other research literature, and publish works of Armenian classical and scientific texts from the Matenadaran as well. Publishing house of Yerevan State University publishes textbooks, collections and scientific monographs since 1922. From this period also involved in publishing the National Library, “Gitelik” (knowledge) and several others. In 1980 have acted in Yerevan on 20 printers. From 1922 until the end of 1970 in Armenia were published about 45 thousand titles of books. In the last years of Soviet power in Armenia each year were printed about 1,100 titles. During this period, books and periodicals published in the Armenian language as in other republics of the USSR.

Since 1920 (the sovietization of Armenia) to the 1980s main centers of the Armenian printing press in the diaspora were Istanbul, Cairo and Beirut (the latter now is its main center). At this moment the Armenian Diaspora was published about 21 thousand titles. Total number of items of Armenian newspapers in 1512 and 1980, more than 80 thousand.

== Armenian printing houses worldwide ==
The following table is a list of the Armenian printing houses from 1512 to 1800.

Year	Place	Book	Publisher	Year
1512	(Republic of Venice) Venice	«Ուրբաթագիրք» ("Urbathagirq", "Friday Book")	Hakob Meghapart	1512
1513	(Republic of Venice) Venice	«Պարզատումար» ("Parzatumar")	Hakob Meghapart	1512
1513	(Republic of Venice) Venice	«Պատարագագիրք» ("Pataragagirq")	Hakob Meghapart	1513
1513	(Republic of Venice) Venice	«Աղթարք» ("Aghtarq")	Hakob Meghapart	1513
1513	(Republic of Venice) Venice	«Տաղարան» ("Tagharan")	Hakob Meghapart	1513
1565	(Republic of Venice) Venice	«Խառնափնթուր տումարի գեղեցիկ եւ պիտանի» ("Kharnapntur tumari geghetsik yev pitani")	Abgar Dpir Tokhatetsi	1565
1567	(Ottoman Empire) Constantinople	«Փոքր քերականութիւն» ("Poqr qerakanutyun", "Brief Armenian Grammar")	Abgar Dpir Tokhatetsi	1567
1584	(Papal States) Rome	«Տոմար Գրիգորեան» ("Tomar Grigorian", "Gregorian Calendar')	Dominico Basa	1584
1616	(Polish–Lithuanian Commonwealth) Lviv	«Սաղմոսարան» ("Saghmosaran", "Psalter")	Yovhannes Karamatanents	1616
1621	(Spain) Milan	"Dictionarium Armeno-Latinum" (Armenian-Latin Dictionary)	Collegium Ambrosianum	1621
1633	(Kingdom of France) Paris	«Բառգիրք Հայոց» ("Bargirq Hayots", "Dictionarium Armeno-Latinum")	Antonius Vitray	1633
1638	(Safavid dynasty) New Julfa	«Սաղմոս ի Դավիթ» ("Saghmosaran", Psalter)	Khachatur Kesaratsi of the Vank Cathedral	1638
1641	(Safavid dynasty) New Julfa	«Հարանց Վարք» ("Harants Varq")	Khachatur Kesaratsi of the Vank Cathedral	1641
1641	(Safavid dynasty) New Julfa	«Խորհրդատետր» ("Khorhrdatetr", Missal)	Khachatur Kesaratsi of the Vank Cathedral	1641
1642	(Safavid dynasty) New Julfa	«Ժամագիրք Ատենի» ("Zhamagirq Ateni")	Khachatur Kesaratsi of the Vank Cathedral	1642
1644	Livorno	«Գիրք եւ Սաղմոսք Դաւթի որ եւ Սաղմոսարան կոչի» ("Girq yev Saghmosq Davti vor yev Saghmosaran kochi", "Psalter")	Yovhannes Jughayetsi	1644
1647	(Safavid dynasty) New Julfa	«Գիրք տումարաց որ եւ պարզատումար կոչի» ("Girq tumarats vor yev parzatumar kochi")	Yovhannes Jughayetsi	1647
1660	(Dutch Republic) Amsterdam	Հիսուս Որդի "Hisus Vordi" (Jesus the Son)	Matteos Caretsi and Avetis Ghlitshents	1660–1661
1672	(Kingdom of France) Marseille	«Սաղմոսարան» ("Saghmosaran", "Psalter")	Oskan Yerevantsi	1672
1676	(Ottoman Empire) Smyrna	«Մաշտոց» ("Mashtots", "Ritual")	N/A	1676
1680	(Electorate of Saxony) Leipzig	"Obadias Armenus" ("Armeno-Latin")	Justinus Brand	1680
1690	(Republic of Venice) Padua	«Դաշանց թուղթ» ("Dashnats tught", "Lettera dell amicitia")	Timoteos Garnuk	1690
1736	(Kingdom of Great Britain) London	Movses Khorenatsi, «Պատմություն» ("Patmutyun", "History") (Mosis Chorenensis, Historiae Armeniacae) Armenian and Latin	William and George Whiston	1736
1771	Vagharshapat	«Սաղմոսարան» ("Saghmosaran", "Psalter")	St. Gregory the Illuminator Press	1772
1776	(Habsburg monarchy) Trieste	«Աղօթք Յուսկան» ("Aghot Yuskan", Prayer of our Holy Hierarch Yusik)	Mkhitarist Press	1774
1781	(Russian Empire) Saint Petersburg	«Ժամագիրք» ("Zhamagirq", "Breviary")	Grigor Khaldareants	1783
1786	(Russian Empire) Nakhichevan-on-Don	«Սաղմոսարան» ("Saghmosaran", "Psalter")	Holy Cross Monastery Press	1790
1796	(Russian Empire) Astrakhan	«Հրովարտակ» ("Hrovartak", "Decree")	Arghuteants press	1796
1796	Calcutta	«Վիճաբանութիւն ար շահ Սլեմանն պարսից» ("Vitsabanuthyun ar sah Slemann parsits", "Dispute Before the Persian Sah Suleyman")	Hovsep Stepanosyan	1797
1810	Bombay			
1812	(Habsburg monarchy) Vienna			
1820	(Russian Empire) Moscow			
1823	(Russian Empire) Tiflis			
1828	(Russian Empire) Shusha			
1833	(Ottoman Empire) Jerusalem			
1848	(Ottoman Empire) Bahçecik			
1856	(Russian Empire) Shamakhi			
1857	(United States) New York City			
1858	(Ottoman Empire) Van			
1859	(Russian Empire) Feodosia, Crimea			
1863	(Ottoman Empire) Muş			
1863	(United Kingdom of Great Britain and Ireland) Manchester			
1865	(Egypt) Cairo			
1871	(Ottoman Empire) Sivas			
1872	(Russian Empire) Baku			
1874	(Russian Empire) Elisabethpol			
1875	(Russian Empire) Rostov-on-Don			
1876	(Russian Empire) Yerevan			
1877	(Russian Empire) Alexandrapol			
1877	(Kingdom of Romania) Focşani			
1883	(Ottoman Empire) Tokat			
1884	(Bulgaria) Varna			
1888	(Egypt) Alexandria			
1888	(Russian Empire) Akhaltsikh			
1889	Tabriz			
1890	(Russian Empire) Nor Bayazet			
1891	(Switzerland) Geneva			
1891	(Bulgaria) Ruse			
1892	(Greece) Athens			
1894	Tehran			
1899	(United States) Boston			

== See also ==
- Global spread of the printing press
- Armenian literature
