= Parzatumar =

Book by Hakob Meghapart

- Author: Hakob Meghapart
- Original title: ՊԱՐԶԱՏՈՒՄԱՐ
- Language: Armenian
- Subject: Christianity
- Publisher: Hakob Meghapart
- Publication date: 1512
- Publication place: Italy
- Pages: 118
- OCLC: 36404531
- Preceded by: Urbatagirk

Parzatumar is a Classical Armenian book. It is the second published book in the Armenian language. The book was written by Hakob Meghapart in 1513. It is a liturgical calendar and a synaxaria.

A copy is held by the National Library of Armenia. That copy is bound with a copy of the first book published in Armenian, Urbatagirk.
