= National Archives of Armenia =

Coordinates: 40.1989°N 44.4949°E

- Armenian: Հայաստանի ազգային արխիվ

Agency overview
- Formed: 1923
- Jurisdiction: Government of Armenia
- Headquarters: Yerevan, Armenia
- Website: Official website

The National Archives of Armenia (Armenian: Հայաստանի ազգային արխիվ, romanized: Hayastani azgayin arkhiv) are the national archives of Armenia. The agency was officially founded in 1923. The headquarters are located in Yerevan, with regional branches in other cities.

== History ==
The archives were established in 1923 by decree of the government of the Armenian SSR. In 2003, the archives were subject to significant change. Smaller archives from across Armenia were consolidated into the national archival system, and the Armenian government passed the law on freedom of information, which granted Armenian (and, to some extent, non-Armenian) researchers access to the national archives.

== Overview ==
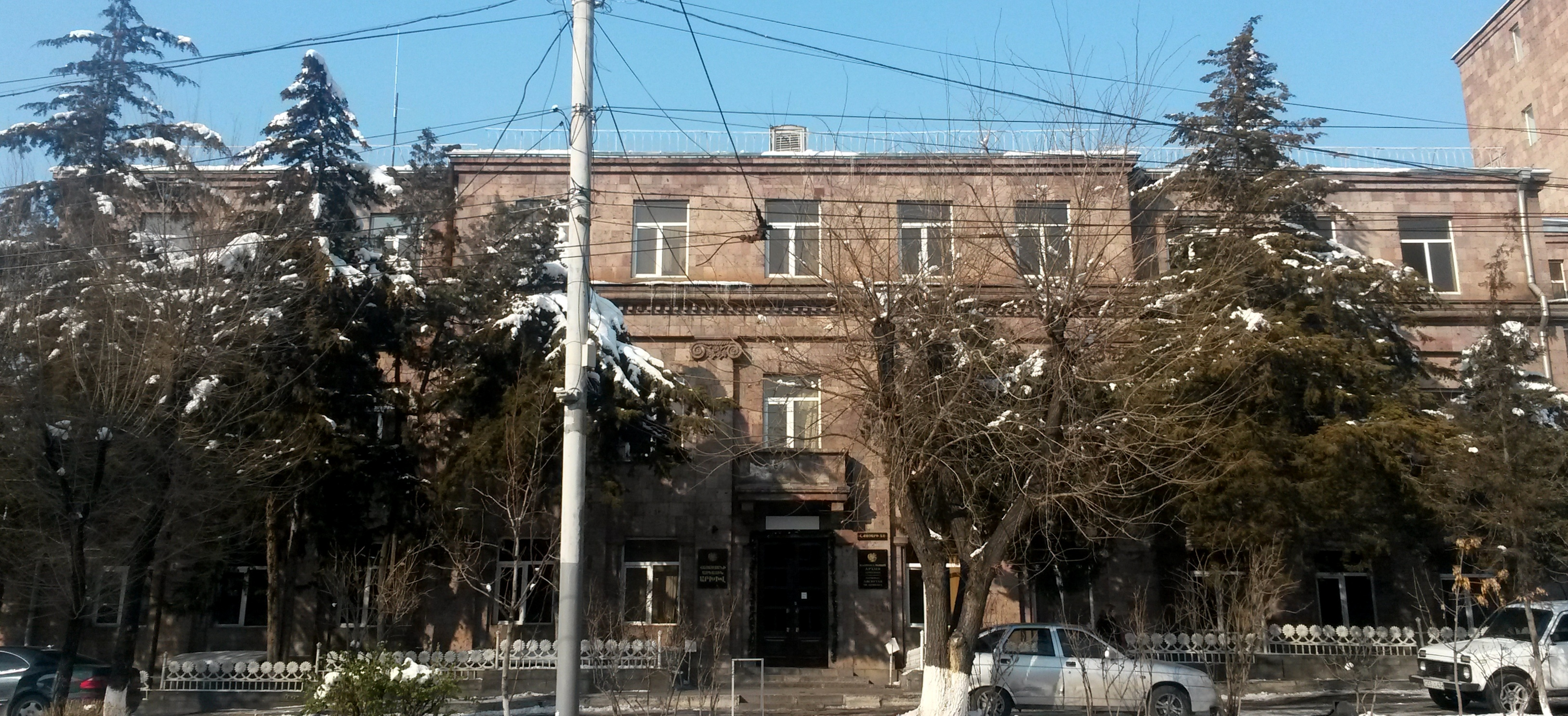
Main building of the National Archives of Armenia at 5 Hrachya Kochar Street

The national archives, a non-commercial state organization, carries out scientific and cultural activities under the direction of the Ministry of Territorial Administration of Armenia, which searches, registers, preserves and uses the collection of archives of Armenia in accordance with the legislation of Armenia. The national archives also provides services in local areas, acting on behalf of the state.

At present, there are 11 regional branches and 29 regional representations under the auspices of the government of Armenia. The main branch of the archive, however, is located in Yerevan's Arabkir District at 5 Hrachya Kochar Street.

As of 1 January 2013, 5,759 funds have been fully concentrated with 3,419,353 storage units. All documents stored in the archive are available to users, except documents that spread information about personal and family secrets and are not sufficiently protected.

Armenian historian Amatuni Virabyan served as the long-time director of the national archives from 2003 to his removal in September 2020.

== International cooperation ==
Armenia is a member of the International Council on Archives.

== See also ==
- Archives by country
- Armenian National Cinematheque
- List of archives
- List of national archives
- National Library of Armenia
