= Armenian National Cinematheque =

The Armenian National Cinematheque (Armenian: Հայաստանի ազգային կինոթատրոն, romanized: Hayastani azgayin kinot'atron) is a film archive located in Yerevan, Armenia.

== History ==
The archive was founded in 1991, by Garegin Zakoyan, the head of the Film and Television department of the Art Institute of the Armenian National Academy of Sciences.

== See also ==
- Armenian Film Society
- Armenfilm
- Cinema of Armenia
- Cinematheque
- List of film archives
- Moscow Cinema
- National Archives of Armenia
