= Khnko Aper =

Armenian writer (1870–1935)

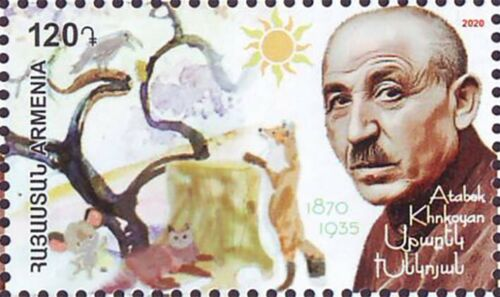
- Khnkoyan on a 2020 stamp of Armenia
- Born: Atabek Hovhannesi Khnkoyan; 19 October 1870; Village of Gharaboya, Lori Region, Russian Armenia (now village of Khnkoyan)
- Died: 8 October 1935 (aged 64); Yerevan
- Occupation: writer

Atabek Khnkoyan (Armenian: Աթաբեկ Հովհաննեսի Խնկոյան, 19 October 1870 – 8 October 1935) was an Armenian writer of prose and poetry, who wrote under the pen name Khnko Aper (Armenian: Խնկո Ապեր) and specialized in children's literature.

== Biography ==
Khnkoyan was born in the village of Gharaboya in the Lori region, renamed Khnkoyan after him. He received his primary education in his birthplace and then in Alexandropol (current day Gyumri). Between 1890 and 1910 he taught in various Armenian schools in Transcaucasia. He contributed to the periodicals Ashkhatavor (The Laborer), Nor ashkhatavor (The New Laborer), Aghbiur (The Fountain), Machkal (The Plowman), Hayastani ashkhatavoruhi (The Armenian Worker-Woman), and Hasker (Spikes), a monthly magazine for children.

Following the establishment of the Soviet regime, he settled in Armenia, where he resumed his career as a writer and educator. He wrote several textbooks to teach Armenian children their mother tongue, including Mer Dbrotse (Our School) and Karmir arev (Crimson Sun).

Khnko Aper wrote mainly children's literature: fables, legends, and lyric and narrative poems. His original writings and translation make a total of 120 books. Giughatsin yev arje (The peasant and the bear, 1909), Gogh makin (The Lamb Thief, 1911, 1941, 1970), Pesatsu muke (Mouse, the Intended Bridegroom to Be, 1912), Arakner (Parables, 1917, 1930, 1937), Tranvaye Yerevanum (The Yerevan Streetcar, 1934, 1936). Mknern inchpes grvetsin katvi tem (How the Mice Fought the Cat, 1936) Khozn u agrave (The Pig and the Crow, 1940), Gayln u katun (The Wolf and the Cat, 1957) and Mkneri zhoghove (The Assembly of Mice, 1957, 1964, 1972, 1979) are among his best known works. Khnko Aper's use of various dialects and popular language add to the charm of his prose and poetry.

He died in Yerevan and was buried in the Komitas Pantheon in Yerevan.

== See also ==
- Khnko Aper Children's Library
