= History of archives of Lithuania =

Archives in Lithuania began to take shape with the formation of the State of Lithuania, i.e. in the first half of the 13th century, but no documents relating to this period remain. The oldest extant archives is the collection of legal documents of the Office (Chancellery) of the Grand Duke of Lithuania (further on referred to as GDL), also known as Lithuanian Metrica: it has documents from the 14th to 18th centuries. In 1795, this collection was transferred from Vilnius to Russia as a war trophy, and now it is preserved in Moscow. The archives which existed in Vilnius and other towns of Lithuania (Archives of the Supreme Tribunal of GDL, archives of land courts and castle courts of Vilnius Region (Pavietas) of GDL, etc.) up to the middle of the 19th century were basically institutional archives.

== History ==
The privilege by which Jesuit academy in Vilnius was turned into University signed by King of Poland and Grand duke of Lithuania Stephen Báthory in 1579 April the 1st. Document from Lithuanian State Historical Archives.

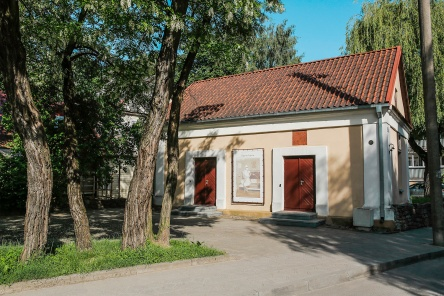
The oldest Lithuanian archive building in Panevėžys was built in 1614. Photo taken in 2014.

The emergence of the Central Archives of the Old Record Books in Vilnius marks a totally new period in the history of Lithuanian archives. Vilnius Central Archives of the Old Record Books (later on referred to as the Archives) were established on 2 April 1852 (O.S.) on the grounds of the imperial decree of Nicholas I, Emperor of Russia. The Tsar Administration was willing to store documents in one place, to safeguard them against forgery or destruction in order to meet the needs of state institutions as well as private persons, especially the nobility. In 1853, by choice of the authorities, the closed Vilnius University building was fitted to accommodate the Archives. The direct supervision of the Archives was assigned to the Educational Board of Vilnius District. However, the activities of the Archives were also under control of Vilnius military governor (Governor-General), i.e. the actual governor of the state.

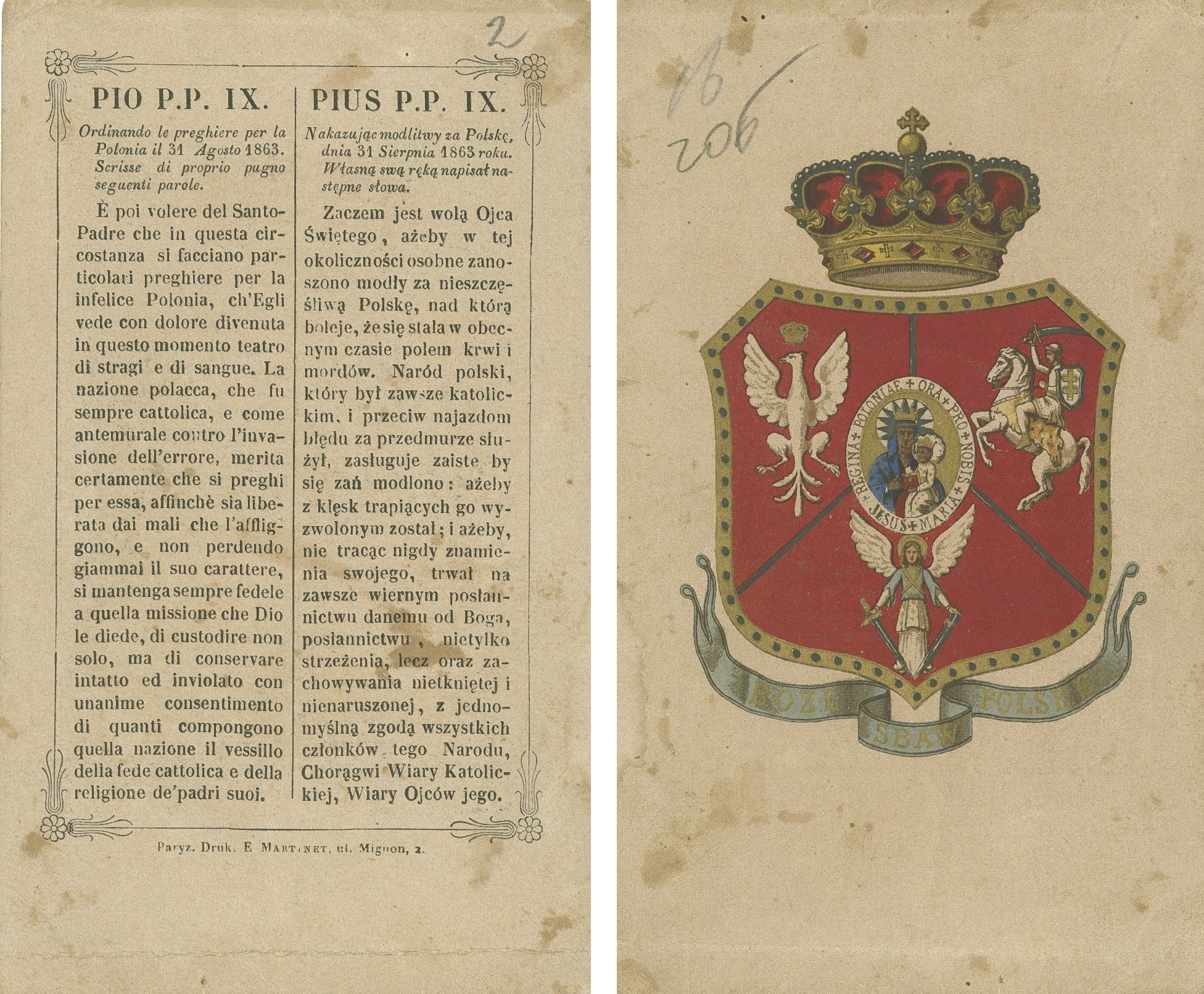
The prayer for Poland in its struggle for independence by pope Pius IX. Inscriptions in Italian and polish Languages. Document from Lithuanian State Historical Archives.

According to the above-mentioned decree of 1852, old record books dating back to ancient times and up to 1799 were to be transferred from various offices in Vilnius, Minsk, Grodno, and Kaunas governorates (guberniyas) to the Vilnius Central Archives of the Old Record Books. Essentially, the Archives were completed as late as 1862 – at that time, the old record books kept there totalled 17,388. They were mainly documents produced by various institutions of GDL. In fact, the accumulation of documents continued: in 1887, documents of the liquidated Lublin Old Record Books Archives were transferred to the Vilnius Archives; documents of the cancelled Vitebsk Central Archives of the Old Record Books were also transferred to the Vilnius Archives in 1903.

The activities of the Archives did not restrict to the document accumulation. The old record books were managed (described, numbered, assigned to fonds) and bound up. There were also inventories of the old record books, as well as place-name indexes arranged. The stock of the accumulated documents served as a base to provide offices and private persons with archival certificates or legal document extracts. Some historical sources have been published. As a matter of fact, the selection of such documents for publication was rather slanted as they mainly served the purpose of leaving no doubt about the “North-western Krai” as an inherent part of Russia. Scientists and other outsiders were rarely admitted to the research of the historical sources – it was possible only with the permission of the highest or local authorities.

After the World War I broke out, nearly half of the documents – the oldest and the most valuable ones kept in the Archives – were exported to Russia. During the times of the occupation of Lithuania by German Empire in 1915–18, the Archives evaded any serious harm. After the German army retreated, in 1919–20, the administration and supervision of the Archives was under Lithuanian governance which was replaced by Polish governance and, later on, by Bolshevik rule. During a very difficult period of military actions in 1919–20, the Vilnius State Archives subordinate to the Polish authorities emerged. It took over the documents not only from the former Vilnius Central Archives of the Old Record Books, but also M. Muravjov museum, former General Archives of Vilnius Offices, and other archives.

For quite a long time the fonds of the Archives were kept in separate buildings in Vilnius, until the Archives moved into a new building situated in 8 Slovackio Street (now 8 Mindaugo Street). However, regular activities of the Archives were terminated by the World War II. After the Soviet army occupied Vilnius, during the period of 14–22 October 1939, approximately 14–18 railway vans loaded with archival documents left for Minsk. The damage that the Archives suffered was immense as it lost its most valuable and most significant sets of documents including approximately 20 thousand old record books and packages. After Lithuania regained Vilnius, the Archives were transferred under the jurisdiction of the Ministry of Education. Juozapas Stakauskas was appointed Head of the Archives.

After the Soviet Union occupied Lithuania in June 1940, the Archives were transferred under the jurisdiction the Commissariat of the Interior on 26 August 1940. At the beginning of 1941, after the numerous reorganisations, the Archives started functioning as the Central State Archives of the Lithuanian Soviet Socialist Republic.

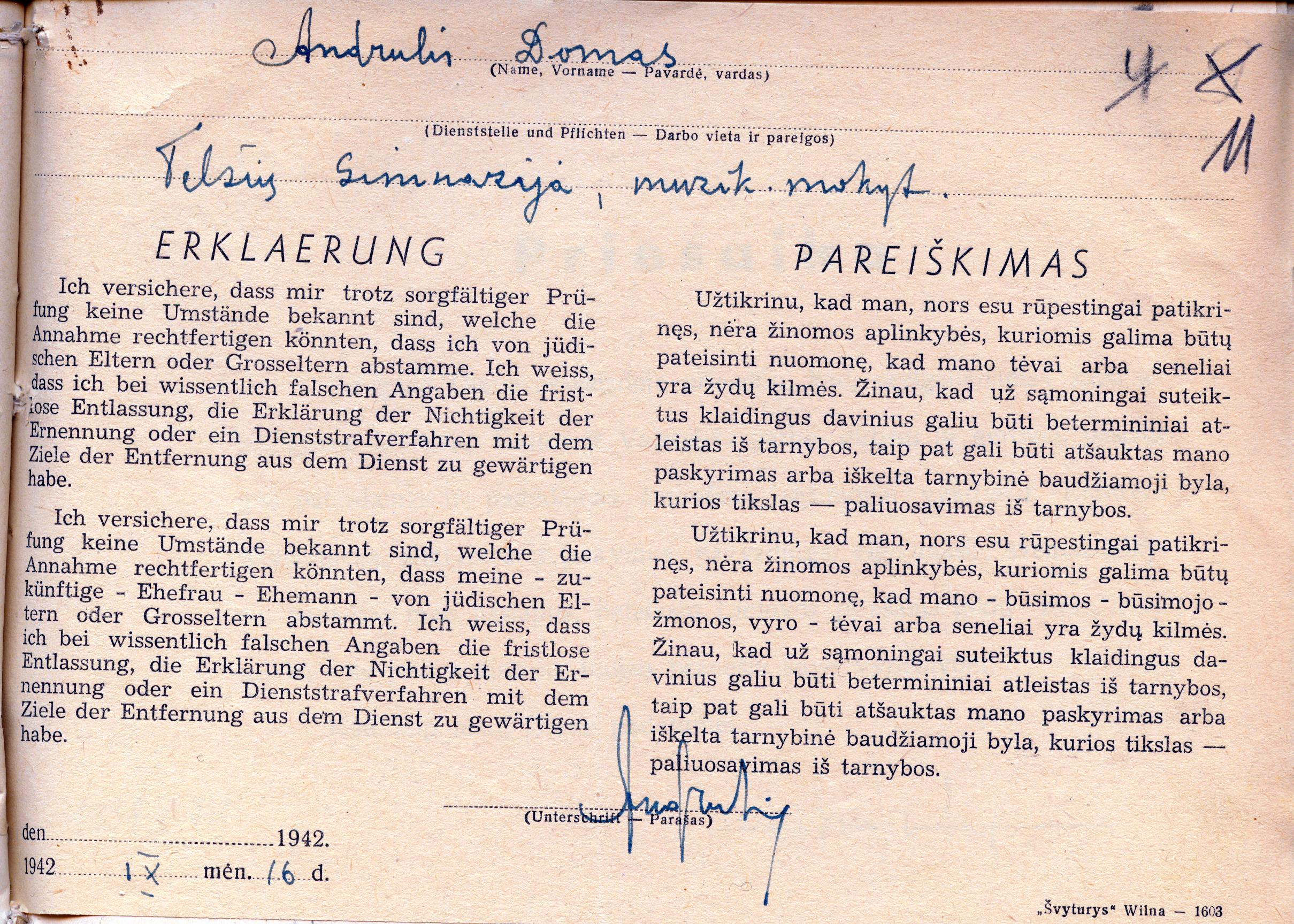
The teacher of Telšiai gymnasium Domas Andriulis states that nor he nor his wife has Jew relatives. Inscription in German and Lithuanian languages. Document from Telšiai county archive.

When the World War II broke out and Lithuania was invaded by the German army in the summer of 1941, the remaining archival documents were in great danger again. Nevertheless, thanks to the incredible luck, J. Stakauskas, Head of the Archives, managed not only to secure the Archives but also to recover the bulk of the documents that were taken to Minsk in 1939: over 20 railway vans of files were brought back to Vilnius in 1942–43.

During Nazi occupation in 1941–44, the Lithuanian Archives were made subordinate to the Reichcommissariat Ostland Adviser for Archival Affairs, so it was mainly Germans who could make use of the archives. Besides, special permits were required to get access to the archives. It is even more amazing that J. Stakauskas, Head of the Archives, and several of his colleagues were sheltering 12 Jewish people in the premises of the Archives for nearly a year at the risk of their lives – and saved life to these people.

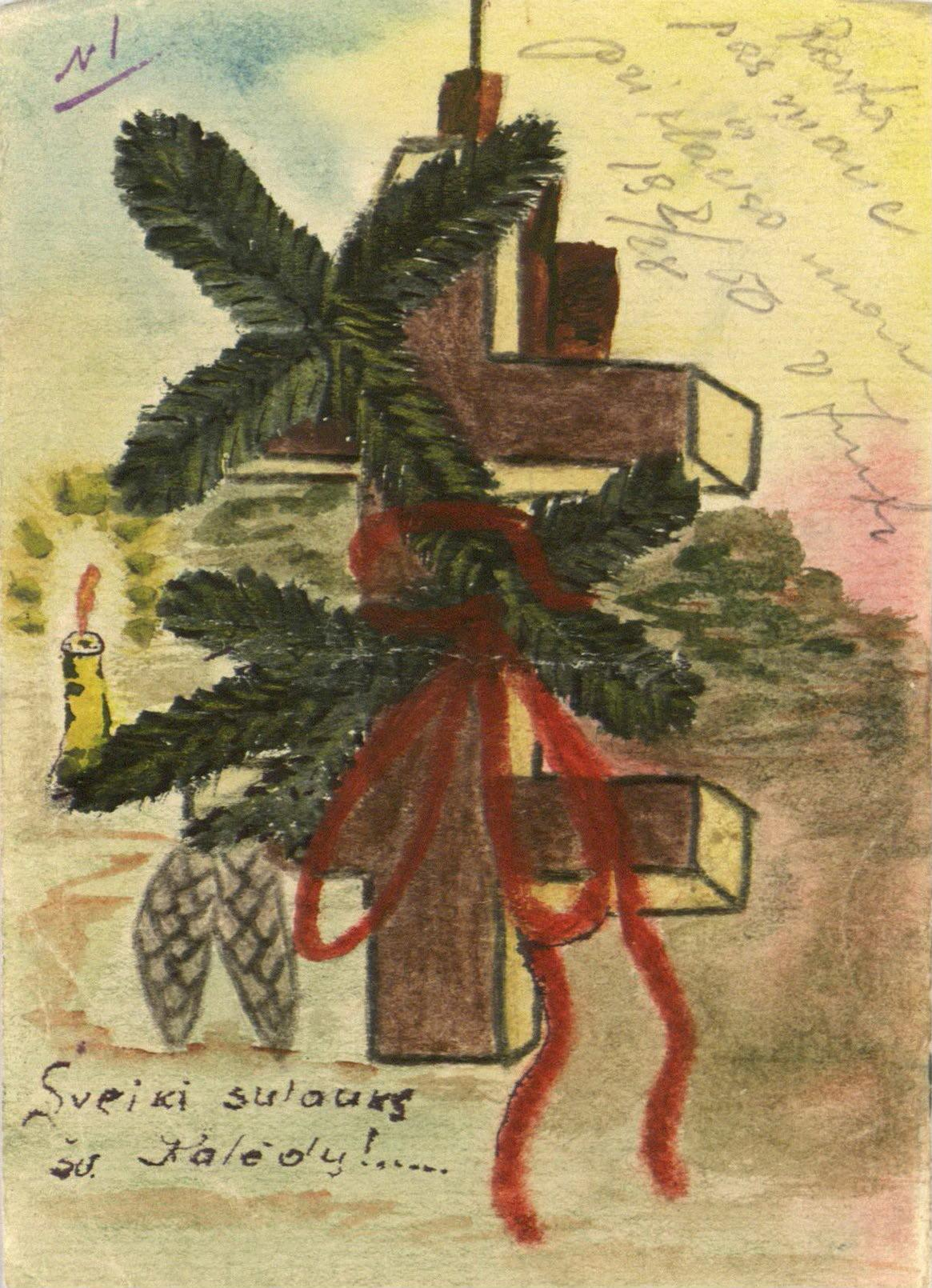
Christmas postcard of Lithuanian partisans. Confiscated by Soviet authorities from partisan supporter in 1950. Lithuanian Special Archives.

In 1944, when the Soviet Union occupied Lithuania again, both the former name and the former subordination were returned to the Archives in Vilnius. The newly appointed authorities were mainly focused on the selection of the loyal employees, handling inquiries of “operational bodies” about private persons, restricting access to historical sources for the public, and absolutely irresponsibly destroyed a certain amount of documents “of little value”; besides, they exported some archival fonds to Belarus without any justification whatsoever.

The idea of establishing separate, independent historical archives was first generated in 1949. The documents compiled in the years before 15 December 1918 were to form the base for the Archives. In 1951, the Division of the Historical Documents Fonds was established in the Archives. The Central State Historical Archives of the Lithuanian Soviet Socialist Republic as a separate institution were established on 1 January 1957. After the former subordination of the Archives was abolished in 1960, they became more open to the society, Lithuanian and foreign scientists.

During this period, a fair amount of the microfilms of historical sources dating back to the 13th to 19th centuries and of great significance to Lithuania (including the Lithuanian Metrica) were added to the fonds of the Archives. They were previously kept in Latvia, Poland, Russia, Belarus, and the Ukraine. A growing number of documents were being published and presented to the public. After the former secret fonds were declassified and starting with 1989, all documents were made accessible to researchers.

== Present day ==
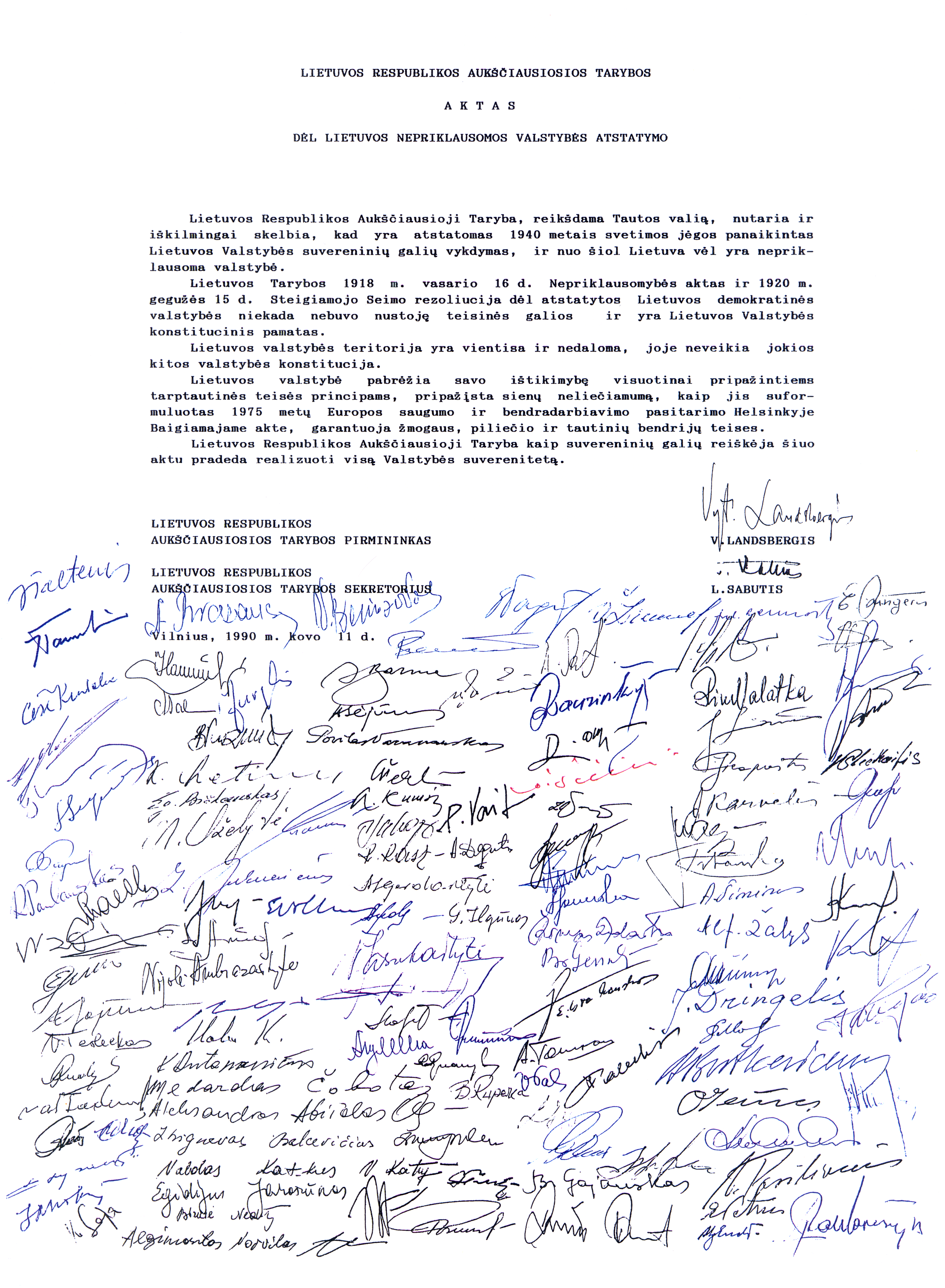
Independence declaration of Lithuania. Signed in 1990 March the 11th. Document from Lithuanian State Modern Archives.

The documents kept in the Lithuanian Archives comprise 8 large sets:

1. Documents of various offices of the Grand Duchy of Lithuania from the 15th to 18th centuries
2. Fonds of offices and organisations of Vilnius, Kaunas and Suvalkai governorates of Russian Empire, and fonds of commissions responsible for the liquidation of offices to be evacuated to the Soviet Russia (1792–1918)
3. Fonds of offices in Lithuania relating to the period of occupation by German Empire (1915–18)
4. Fonds of confessional institutions and communities operating in Lithuania (15th – 20th centuries)
5. Fonds of private persons and families (15th century – 1941)
6. Document collections (15th – 20th centuries)
7. Collections of microfilms of documents and collections of digital images of documents (13th – 20th centuries)
8. Recordings of the civil state (1940 – 15 August 2007)

As of 2013, the total amount of the items preserved is 1.36 million, or over 17,500 linear metres.

== See also ==
- List of national archives
- Office of the Chief Archivist of Lithuania
- List of libraries in Lithuania
