= List of libraries in Armenia =

This is a list of libraries in Armenia.

== Libraries by province ==
=== Aragatsotn ===
- Aragatsotn Regional Library

=== Ararat ===
- Ararat Regional Library

=== Armavir ===
- Armavir Regional Library
- Vatche and Tamar Manoukian Manuscript Library, Vagharshapat

=== Gegharkunik ===
- Murtini Regional Library

=== Kotayk ===
- Kotayk Regional Library

=== Lori ===
- Lori Regional Library

=== Shirak ===
- Shirak Regional Library

=== Syunik ===
- Goris City Library
- Syunik Regional Library

=== Tavush ===
- Tavush Regional Library

=== Vayots Dzor ===
- Vayots Dzor Regional Library

=== Yerevan ===
See also: List of libraries in Yerevan (in Armenian)

- City Central Library after Avetik Isahakyan
- Fundamental Scientific Library of the National Academy of Sciences of Armenia
- Khnko Aper Children's Library
- Matenadaran
- National Library of Armenia
- Scientific and Technical Library, Yerevan
- Yerevan State University Library

== See also ==
- Access to public information in Armenia
- Armenian literature
- List of archives in Armenia
- Mass media in Armenia

in Armenian

- Armenian Library Association (in Armenian)
- Bulletin of Armenian Libraries (in Armenian)
- Copyright in Armenia (in Armenian)
- Libraries of Armenia (in Armenian)
