= Atakhan Pashayev =

Azerbaijani politician (1938–2022)

Chief of the National Archive Department of Azerbaijan
- In office 2 December 2002 – 4 August 2022
- President: Heydar Aliyev; Ilham Aliyev
- Preceded by: Office established

Personal details
- Born: 1 May 1938 Bashkend, Culfa Rayon, Azerbaijan SSR, USSR
- Died: 4 August 2022 (aged 84)

Atakhan Avaz oglu Pashayev (Azerbaijani: Ataxan Paşayev Əvəz oğlu; 1 May 1938 – 4 August 2022) was an Azerbaijani government executive who served as Chief of the National Archive Department of Azerbaijan since 2002.

== Early life ==
Pashayev was born in 1938 in Bashkend, Nakhchivan exclave of Azerbaijan. In 1963, he graduated from the History department of Azerbaijan State University cum laude. He started his career at Central State October Revolution Archives as the Senior Scientist in 1962. In 1963–1965, he was the Senior Tutor at the Archives Department and in 1966–1982 he worked as the Director of the Central State Literature and Arts Archives. From 1982 through 1984, Pashayev was the Senior Professor at Azerbaijan Technical University. In 1981, he obtained his PhD in History. From 1984, he was also editor of Azərbaycan arxivi (Azerbaijani Archives) magazine.

== Political career ==
In 1984, he was appointed the Chief of the State Archives of Azerbaijan SSR. On 5 December 2008, he was appointed the Chairman of National Archives Collegium. Pashayev was reappointed to the position of Chief of the newly created independent National Archive Department on 2 December 2002.

== Awards ==
In 1968, Pashayev was awarded by the Supreme Soviet of Azerbaijan SSR with the honorary title of merited worker and in 1981 with the title of Merited Arts Worker.

== See also ==
- Cabinet of Azerbaijan
