= Office of the Chief Archivist of Lithuania =

Lithuanian policy official agency

- Lietuvos Vyriausiojo Archyvaro Tarnyba

Agency overview
- Formed: 2011
- Preceding agency: Department of Archives
- Headquarters: Mindaugo Street 8, Vilnius, Lithuania
- Parent agency: Government of Lithuania
- Website: archyvai.lt

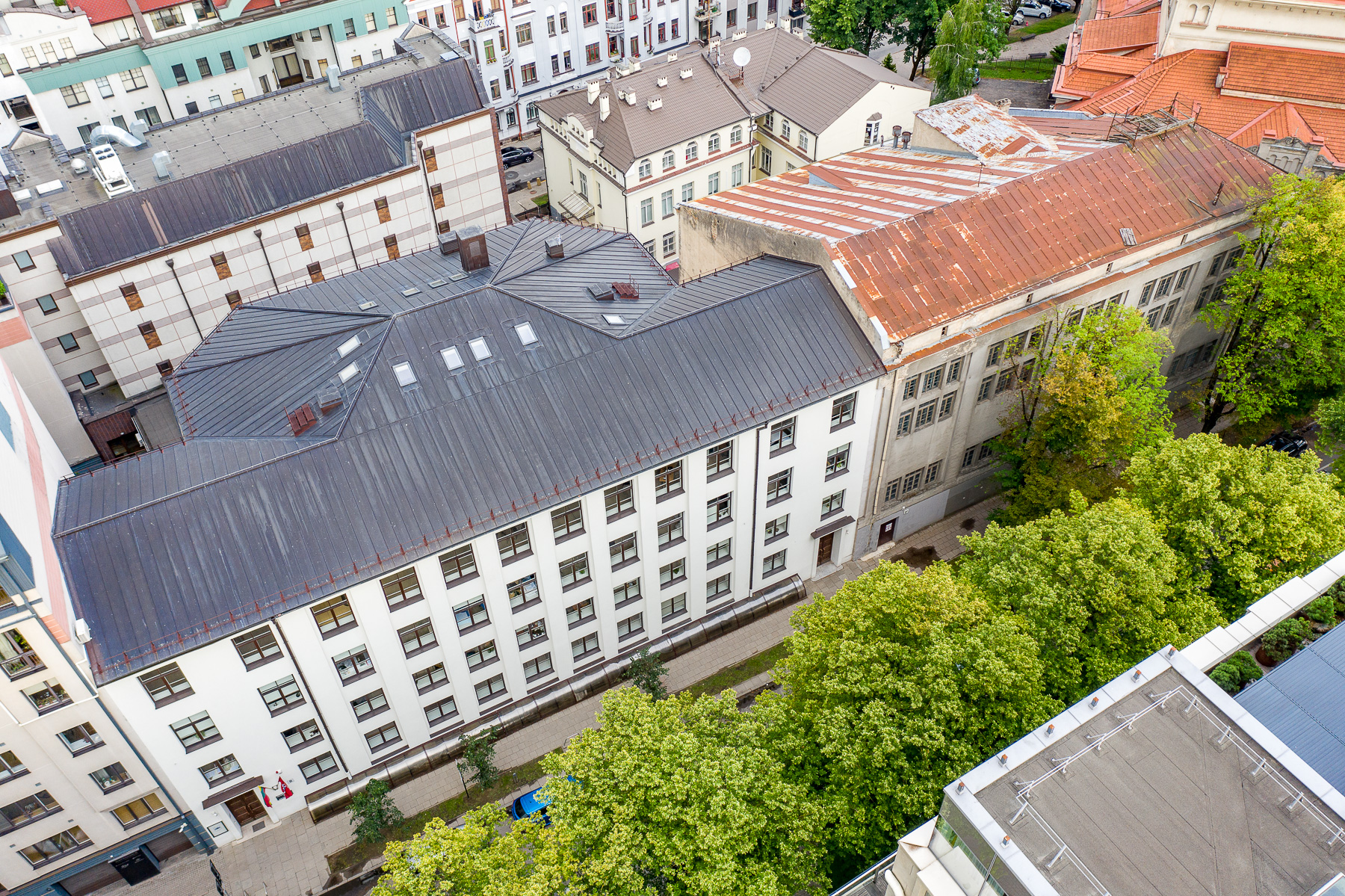
Headquarters

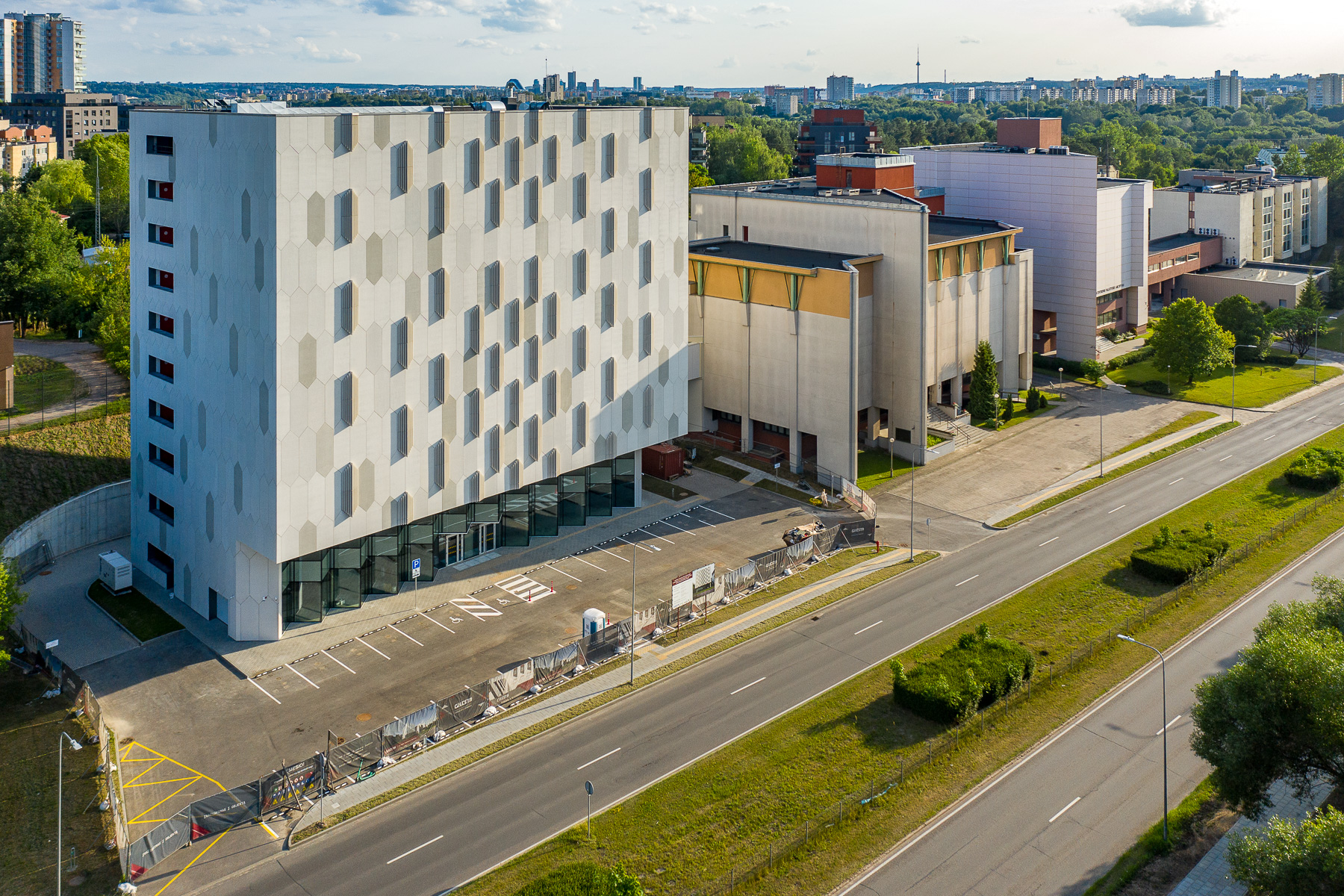
Archive complexes

The Office of the Chief Archivist of Lithuania (Lithuanian: Lietuvos Vyriausiojo Archyvaro Tarnyba) is a government agency in Lithuania, which participates in the shaping of national policy in the field of management and use of documents and archives, as well as implements this policy, supports the Chief Archivist of Lithuania in the carrying-out of state administration of the field of documents and archives.

== History ==
The emergence of archives in Lithuania is associated with the formation of the Grand Duchy of Lithuania in the first half of the 13th century. The old Lithuanian chancery archives of Grand Duke and King Mindaugas did not survive: they were destroyed by numerous wars and fires. The Grand Duke's chancery archives later acquired the title of the Lithuanian Metrica. In the Middle Ages archives of towns, churches and estates were formed. When the Russian Empire occupied Lithuania in 1795, the most important Lithuanian archives were transferred to Russia.

It was in middle of the 19th century the first archives was established as a special institution for accumulating and preserving records. The year 1852 saw the establishment of the Vilnius Central Archives of Early Register Books, the purpose of which was to preserve official files of the Grand Duchy of Lithuania. Records from the period of the Russian invasion (19th–20th centuries), belonging to Tsarist Russian institutions of the Vilna Governorate, were stored in the Joint Archives of Vilnius Institutions established in 1872–76.

After the declaration of the independent Republic of Lithuania, the Central State Archives were established in Kaunas on 19 October 1921. The purpose of these archives was to collect and preserve all records of former state and local government institutions, take care of archives belonging to private persons, and accommodate archival records recovered from Russia.

Following the Soviet occupation of Lithuania in 1940, the country's institutions were dismantled and replaced with the new Soviet authorities. On August 5, 1940 the new Council of Ministers laid the responsibility for archives management and preservation with the ministry of the Interior. In 1961 the Archival Board under the Council of Ministers of the LSSR was established. In 1957–68, the basis was laid to the network of state archives consisting of central and regional archives. During the occupation between 1940 and 1990, the Lithuanian archives made some notable progress in recovery of a number of archival records from other countries as well as general development of a sound state archival system.

After the Lithuanian independence was reestablished on 11 March 1990, the modern system of state archives was formed.

== Structure and organization ==
At present, the state archival system consists of Office of the Chief Archivist of Lithuania as the central institution and 15 state archives subordinate to it, of which there are 10 archives for each county and 5 specialised archives:

- Lithuanian State Historical Archives
- Lithuanian Central State Archives
- Lithuanian Special Archives
- Lithuanian State Modern Archives
- Lithuanian Archives of Literature and Art

The National Documentary Fonds consists of activity documents of state and municipal institutions, agencies and enterprises, persons authorised by the state, activity documents of state agencies and enterprises which operated in Lithuania at various times, as well as the documents preserved in state archives. Activity documents of enduring value of non-governmental organisations, private legal and natural persons, as well as the documents of the historical heritage of Lithuania or related to Lithuania, or their copies, received from other states may be included to the National Documentary Fonds.

Today, state archives play an important role in the processes of preserving and using public records of the Lithuanian National Documentary Fonds, making them accessible to the citizens and governmental and public institutions, creating efficient information search systems, providing public services.

The state archives service plays an important role in the processes of records management in the public sector, for the transparency and accountability of public administration. State archives provide records on approximately 2,000 institutions and agencies.

== See also ==
- History of archives of Lithuania
