= Arakel of Tabriz =

Armenian historian (1590s–1670)

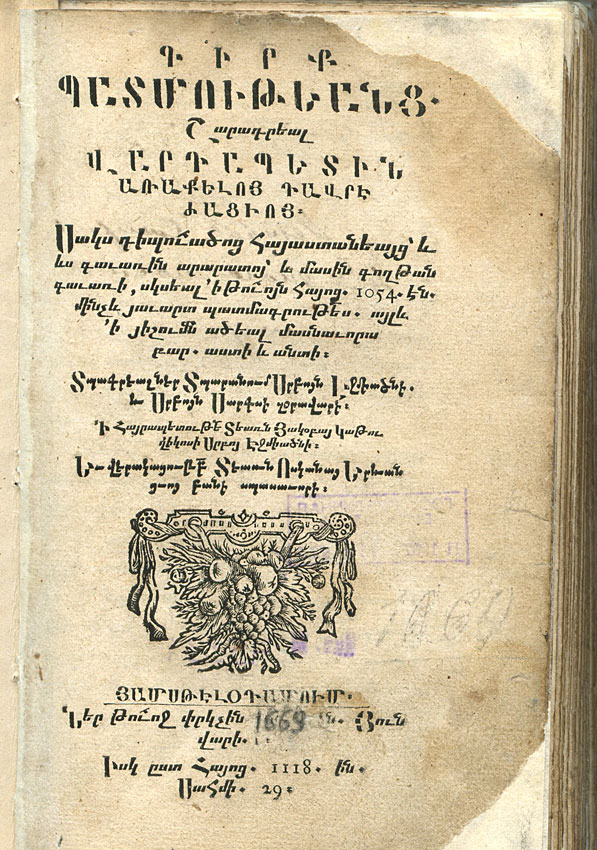
First print edition of Arakel's History, printed in Amsterdam at Voskan Yerevantsi's press, 1669.

Arakel of Tabriz or Arakel Davrizhetsi (Armenian: Առաքել Դաւրիժեցի; (Note: Reformed orthography: Առաքել Դավրիժեցի) 1590s–1670) was an Armenian historian and clergyman from Tabriz. His History is an important and reliable source for the histories of the Safavid and Ottoman empires, Armenia, Azerbaijan, and Georgia for the period 1602–1662.

== Background ==
Arakel was born in Tabriz (called Davrezh in the Armenian of the time) in the 1590s. He received his theological training at the seminary at Etchmiadzin, the seat of the Armenian Apostolic Church, where he was ordained a vardapet (celibate priest/archimandrite). In 1636, he was appointed abbot of Hovhannavank Monastery, a position he held for one year before returning to Etchmiadzin․ He was later sent on various missions to Isfahan, Amasya, Sivas, Urfa, Aleppo, Jerusalem, and Athens as a nuncio of Catholicos Pilippos.

In 1662, he completed his History, also known as the Book of Histories (Girk’ Patmut’eants’), a unique work on the history of Armenia and adjacent countries and peoples in the seventeenth century. He witnessed many events and described them in the book. Notably, his work contains an account of the mass deportation of Armenians under the Safavid shah Abbas I. Arakel Davrizhetsi was the first Armenian historian whose work was printed. In 1669, Arakel's Book of Histories was published in Amsterdam at the printing press of Voskan Yerevantsi. Arakel died in 1670 at Etchmiadzin and was buried, as he desired, in the cemetery of the brotherhood at the monastery of Etchmiadzin.

== Sources ==
- Sanjian, A. K. (1986). "Aṙakʿel of Tabrīz". In Yarshater, Ehsan (ed.). Encyclopædia Iranica. Vol. II/3: ʿArab Moḥammad–Architecture IV (Online ed.). Encyclopædia Iranica Foundation. pp. 249–250.
- Aṛakʻel of Tabriz (2010). Book of History. Translated by Bournoutian, George A. Costa Mesa, California: Mazda Publishers. ISBN 978-1-56859-172-8.
