= Vatche and Tamar Manoukian Manuscript Library =

Library in Vagharshapat, Armenia

Coordinates: 40.1604°N 44.2934°E

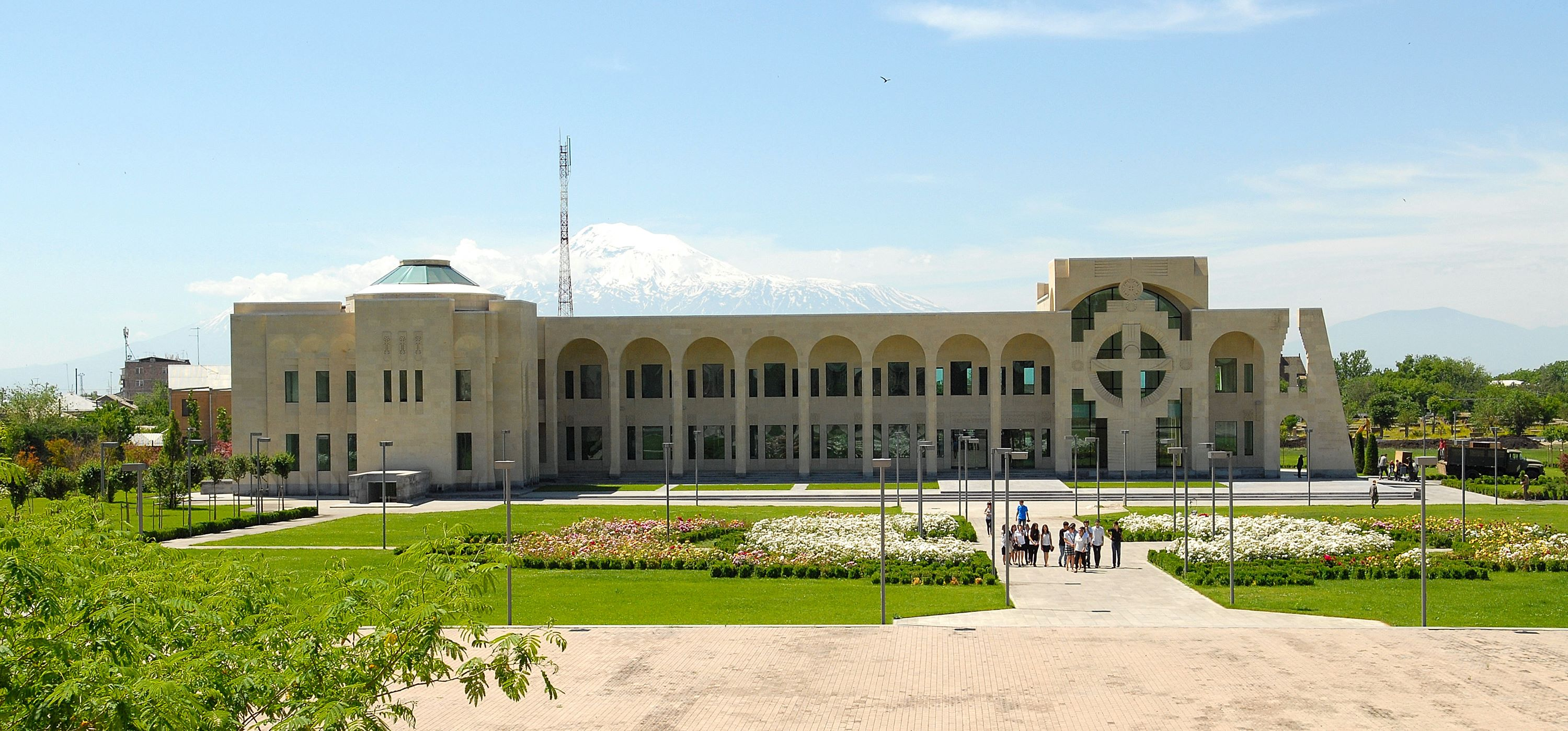

Vatche and Tamar Manoukian (Armenian: Վաչե և Թամար Մանուկյան մատենադարան) is a manuscript library (Matenadaran) located in Vagharshapat, Armenia.

== See also ==
- Armenian Apostolic Church
- List of libraries in Armenia
