= Hakob Meghapart =

Hakob Meghapart Հակոբ Մեղապարտ
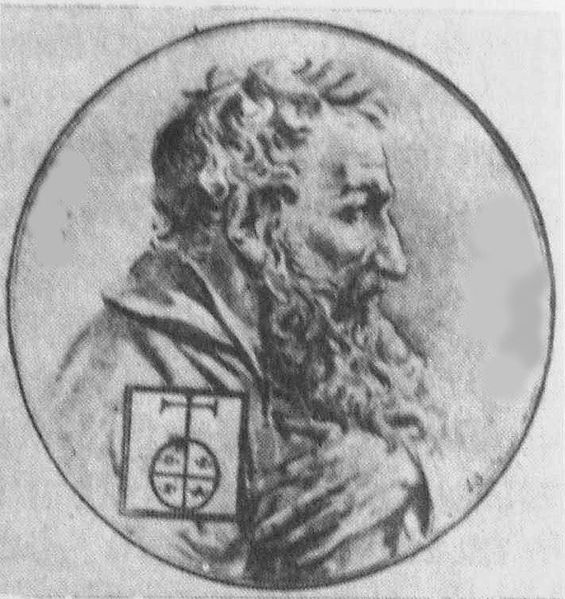
- Hakob Meghapart
- Born: 15th century
- Died: 16th century
- Occupation: printing
- Writing career
- Notable work: Urbatagirk

Hakob Meghapart (Armenian: Հակոբ Մեղապարտ, Jacob the Sinner) (date of birth and death are unknown), was the first Armenian printer, the originator of printing in Armenia. His activities were developed in Venice in the beginning of the 16th century. In 1512-1513 his publishing house gave birth to the following publications:

- Urbatagirk (Armenian: Ուրբաթագիրք)
- Pataragatetr (Armenian: Պատարագատետր)
- Aghtark (Armenian: Աղթարք)
- Parzatumar (Armenian: Պարզատումար)
- Tagharan (Armenian: Տաղարան)

The first book that he printed was called "Urbatagirk", which had 124 paper pages, also 24 are colored and the pages are printed in red and black. The books printed by him have a special printer's mark.

== See also ==
- Armenian printing
