= Khnkoyan =

Khnkoyan Խնկոյան
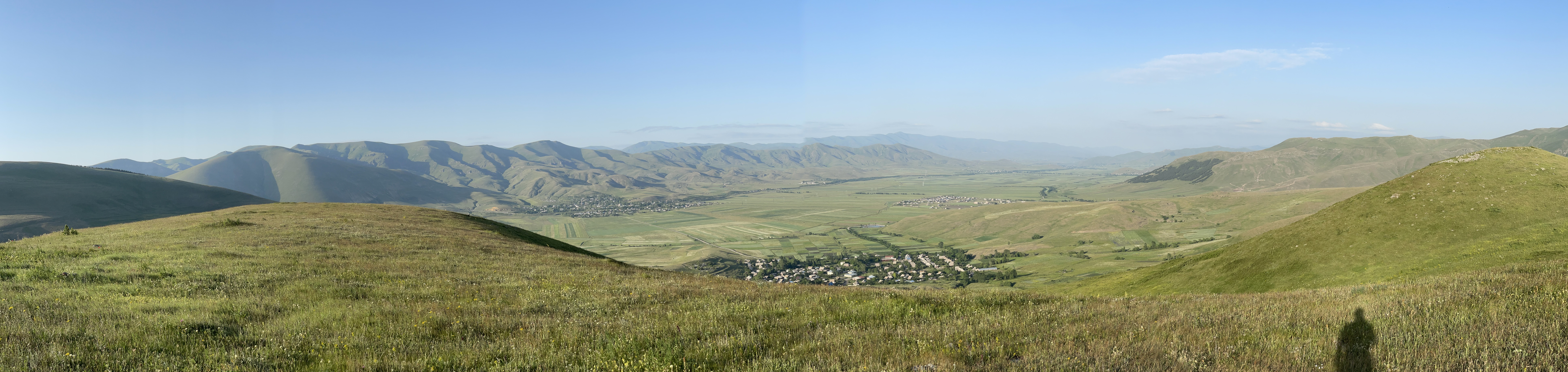
- Panorama of Khnkoyan (with Lusaghbyur and Hartagyugh) from a neighboring mountain

- Location within Armenia
- Coordinates: 40°50′23″N 44°01′12″E
- Country: Armenia
- Marz (Province): Lori Province
- Elevation: 1,800 m (5,900 ft)

Population (2011)
  - Total: 259
- Time zone: UTC+4 ( )
  - Summer (DST): UTC+5 ( )

Khnkoyan (Armenian: Խնկոյան) is a village in the Lori Province of Armenia. It is located on the banks of the Pambak River, near its source, 48 km southwest of the provincial capital of Vanadzor. Known as Gharaboya until 1946, it was renamed in honor of its most famous native, the children's author Atabek Khnkoyan (Khnko Aper), whose house museum is located in the village.

The main economic activities are cattle breeding and cultivation of grain, fodder crops, beets and fruits. As of 1980, there were quarries producing construction materials in the village. It has a school, a club, a library, and a nursery-kindergarten. It has a temperate climate, with mild summers (maximum temperature 27 °C) and long, frosty winters lasting about 5 months.

== Population ==
Year	1831	1873	1897	1926	1939	1959	1970	1979	1989	2001	2011
Population	69	387	692	487	831	624	580	379	203	414	259
