= List of archives in Azerbaijan =

This is a list of archives in Azerbaijan.

== Archives ==
1. State Archives of the Republic of Azerbaijan (az)
2. Archive of Political Documents of the Office of the President of Azerbaijan (az)
3. State Archives of Political Parties and Public Movements of the Republic of Azerbaijan (az)
4. State Archives of Scientific and Technical Documents of the Republic of Azerbaijan (az)
5. State Archives of Literature and Art of the Republic of Azerbaijan (az)
6. State Archives of Cinematographic Documents of the Republic of Azerbaijan (az)
7. State Archives of Sound Recordings of the Republic of Azerbaijan (az)
8. State Historical Archives of the Republic of Azerbaijan (az)
9. State Archives of the Nakhchivan Autonomous Republic (az)

== See also ==
- National Archive Department of Azerbaijan
- List of archives
- List of libraries in Azerbaijan
- List of museums in Azerbaijan
- Culture of Azerbaijan
