= List of archives in Armenia =

This is list of archives in Armenia.

== Archives ==
- Archive of Armenian State Architectural University
- Archive of Armenian Agrarian University
- Archive of Armenian State Institute of Physical Culture
- Archive of Armenian State Pedagogical University after Kh. Abovyan
- Archive of Republic of Armenia Courts
- Archive of the Public Library of Armenia
- Archive of the Republic of Armenia Ministry of Defense
- Archive of the Republic of Armenia president's personnel
- Archive of Yerevan Architectural-Constructing University
- Archive of Yerevan State Art Academy
- Archive of Yerevan State Economic Institute
- Archive of Yerevan State Medical University
- Archive of Yerevan State University
- Personnel archive of Armenian Civil Service Council
- Personnel archive of the Republic of Armenia Central bank
- Personnel archive of the Republic of Armenia government
- Personnel archive of the Republic of Armenia Ministry of City Building
- Personnel archive of the Republic of Armenia Ministry of Culture and Youth Issues
- Personnel archive of the Republic of Armenia Ministry of Education and Science
- Personnel archive of the Republic of Armenia Ministry of Finance and Economics
- Personnel archive of the Republic of Armenia Ministry of Nature Protection
- Personnel archive of the Republic of Armenia Ministry of Trade and Economical Development
- Personnel archive of the Republic of Armenia Ministry of Transport and Communications
- Personnel archive of the Republic of Armenia Ministry of Work and Social Questions
- Personnel archive of the Republic of Armenia National Assembly
- Personnel archive of the Republic of Armenia National Safety service
- Personnel archive of the Republic of Armenia National Statistics service
- Personnel archive of the Republic of Armenia police
- Personnel archive of the Republic of Armenia rescue service
- Personnel archive of the Republic of Armenia state customs committee
- Personnel archive of the Republic of Armenia state Fund of Social Insurance
- Personnel archive of the Republic of Armenia state committee of physical education and sports
- Personnel archive of the Republic of Armenia state taxation service
- Personnel archive of Yerevan municipality
- Republic of Armenia National Academy of Science Archive
- Republic of Armenia Procurator's office Archive
- State archive of the Republic of Armenia civil state acts registration

== See also ==
- List of archives
- List of libraries in Armenia
- List of museums in Armenia
- Culture of Armenia
