= Access to public information in Armenia =

Access to public information is the right to access information held by public bodies also known as "right to know". Access to public information is considered of fundamental importance for the effective functioning of democratic systems, as it enhances governments' and public officials' accountability, boosting people participation and allowing their informed participation into public life. The fundamental premise of the right to access public information is that the information held by governmental institutions is in principle public and may be concealed only on the basis of legitimate reasons which should be detailed in the law. Access to public information builds on the principle that in a democratic system people should be in the condition of accessing a wide range of information in order to effectively participate in public life as well as on matters affecting them.

In Armenia the right of access to information is guaranteed and defined by the Articles 27 and 27.1 of the constitution. Also, Armenia has a specific law on freedom of information providing the basic foundations for the realization of this right. According to the constitution and the law, in Armenia everybody, no matter the citizenship, has a right to have access to information.

== Legal framework ==
The Law on Freedom of Information was adopted in September 2003 and was widely considered a progressive document, greatly appreciated by international experts. Since the adoption of the law, civil society and the journalists community, have advocated for the need to pass the regulations that would have supported and improved the implementation of the law. Such regulations were finally adopted in October 2015, when the Armenian government approved a procedure for improving the effectiveness of the procedure to access public information by streamlining the classification, maintenance and provision of information from the government to the public. Prior to the adoption of these regulations, in several cases public officials used to cite the lack of these implementation rules when refusing requests for information.

=== Public bodies concerned by access to information ===
According to the law, people can obtain information from: central government bodies, self-governing bodies, state institutions, organizations financed from central or local government finances, organizations with public functions, i.e. organisations providing public services (for instance, private universities, schools, hospitals, energy provider companies, etc.) Each body has a person that is responsible for freedom of information and is in charge of dealing with information requests.

=== Procedure ===
To submit a request to access information, applicants have to apply to the information holder with a written or oral inquiry to be addressed to specific departments in the appropriate body or organization. Civil society organizations advocating for access to information suggest to apply with a written inquiry so that a compliant can be done in case of rejection. To be taken into consideration, both written and oral inquiries have to meet the requirements stated by the law.

The inquirer is not obliged to justify the enquiry and to state the reason for it or how the information sought is going to be used.

If the body/organizations does not possess all the details concerning the information required, the information holder has to provide the available parts and mention the name and the location of other possible information holders who might be in possess of other details concerning the information sought.

Information are provided free of charge. Only technical expenses of information provision (photocopies, electronic supports, etc.) can be charged.

=== Exceptions ===
Freedom of information can be restricted only on grounds well defined by the law. Information holder may refuse to provide information if it contains state, official, bank or trade secret; infringe the privacy of individuals and his family; contains pre-investigation data which cannot be made public; concerns data with accessibility limitation (such as business, notary or medical secrets); infringes copyright and associated rights.

=== Right to appeal ===
In case of rejection, the information holder has to inform the applicant within 5 days in a written form and explain the reasons for the refusal as well as the relevant appealing procedures. Denials can be appealed to the Ombudsman or the court by administrative procedure. Citizens can also apply directly to the concerned bodies without appealing by an administrative procedure. Also, it is possible to apply to non-governmental organizations which provide legal advisory.

== Access to public information in practice ==
In practice, despite the good legal framework, citizens and media professionals face some problems in accessing documents, such as incomplete disclosure of the information required, extensions of the time frame for obtaining information prescribed by the law, the refusal of some government bodies and officials to implement the law, and so forth. According to the NGO Freedom of Information Center of Armenia and the Transparency International Anticorruption Center, the main challenge is the behaviour of some public officials and public bodies that continue to provide answers that are either irrelevant or incomplete. This has resulted in major difficulties for NGOs being less and less successful in bringing freedom of information cases before the courts than in previous years, as judges rejected their cases on the grounds that public offices had provided the answers, regardless of their content.

In Armenia, NGOs have played a significant role in educating the public on how to exercise their "right to know" and have organised trainings for public officials. By 2012, the NGO Freedom of Information Center Armenia has distributed around 2050 bulletin boards in several urban and rural communities in order to inform the public on the right to access public information and how to realize it.

== See also ==
- Freedom of information laws by country
- Transparency of media ownership in Europe
- List of libraries in Armenia
- Media of Armenia
- Transparency of media ownership in Armenia
