= National Archive Department of Azerbaijan =

National Archive Department of the Republic of Azerbaijan
- Azərbaycan Respublikasının Milli Arxiv İdarəsi
- Coat of Arms of Azerbaijan

Agency overview
- Formed: December 2, 2002
- Preceding agency: Central State Archive of the Republic of Azerbaijan
- Headquarters: 3 Ziya Bunyadov Avenue, Baku, Azerbaijan AZ1106
- Agency executive: Atakhan Pashayev, Chief of the National Archive Department
- Website: www.milliarxiv.gov.az

The National Archive Department of the Republic of Azerbaijan (Azerbaijani: Azərbaycan Respublikasının Milli Arxiv İdarəsi) is a governmental agency within the Cabinet of Azerbaijan in charge of managing, maintaining, protecting and updating national archives of Azerbaijan. The agency is headed by Atakhan Pashayev.

== History ==
After the occupation of the Azerbaijan Democratic Republic in 1920, the Bolsheviks established the State Archives Fund under the People's Commissariat for Education which started its activities in 1921. In 1922, the management of the archives was passed to the Bureau of Central Executive Committee of Azerbaijan SSR. In 1925, a similar archives department was created in Nakhchivan. Starting from 1928, regional chapters of the state archives department were created throughout the republic. In 1930, the Central Committee of the Communist Party established the Central Archives Department, which was made up of the Central State October Revolution Archives and Central State Historical Archives. In 1938, the management of the archives was passed under the jurisdiction of the Ministry of Internal Affairs and in 1960 it was subordinated to the Cabinet of Ministers. In 1966, the State Literature and Arts Archives of Azerbaijan SSR was created.

The National Archive Department was established on December 2, 2002 by Presidential Decree No. 816 on the basis of an existing Main Archives Department of the Cabinet of Ministers, which had been in existence since March 11, 1994 in order to modernize the management and maintenance of national archives of Azerbaijan. Its statute was approved on September 27, 2003 by President Heydar Aliyev. The agency ensures the implementation of state policies in relation to updating and maintaining national archives through its direct activities in the collection and preservation of data and documents as well as through its regional chapters and the national archives of Nakhchivan Autonomous Republic of Azerbaijan. The activities of the department are financed through funds allocated from the state budget of Azerbaijan.

== Structure ==
The agency is headed by its chief and the department collegium. The collegium is chaired by the chief of the National Archive Department, and his deputy. The archive department has two main bodies: the Scientific Council and the Central Expert Verification Commission. Main functions of the agency are participation in policy building in regards to management of national archives; ensuring acceptance, protection and careful use of the archival documents related to cultural heritage and history of Azerbaijan as well as documents of scientific, historical, social, economic, importance; collection, categorization, accounting and management of archival resources; continuously modifying the archives management system in accordance with international standards; writing progress reports to the government of Azerbaijan on the status of state archives. Currently, there are 6 state archives under central management of the National Archive Department, 15 regional chapters and the State Archives of Nakhchivan Autonomous Republic.

== Chronology ==
In 1920, the Decree "On the Establishment of the Unified State Archive Foundation and the Organization of the Central State Archive under the Public Education Commissariat" was signed.

In 1921, the Central State Archive of Azerbaijan started functioning as the first state archive in the Caucasus.

In 1922, the leadership of the Central State Archives was directly given to the Presidium of the Central Executive Committee of Azerbaijan.

In 1925, the Central Archive of the Nakhchivan Autonomous Republic created.

İn 1928 establishment of accidental archive bureaus in Azerbaijan.

In 1930 the activity of the Archives was expanded and the Presidium of the Central Executive Committee of the Azerbaijan SSR made a decision on the establishment of the Republican Central Archive Office and approved its regulation. Two central state archives: The Central State Archive of October Revolution and Central State Historical Archive were established in April of the same year by the Presidium of the Central Executive Committee of the Azerbaijan SSR on the basis of the central archive created in 1920.

In 1938, Archive Organizations were given under supervision of the Commissariat of Internal Affairs in Azerbaijan.

In 1960 archive organizations were given under supervision of the Council of Ministers of the Republic of Azerbaijan.

The Art Archive and Central State Literature of the Azerbaijan SSR was established in 1966.

during 1986-1969 Central State Archive of Recorded Sound of the Azerbaijan, Central State Archive of Science, Technology and Medical Documents and branches of the Central State October Revolution Archives in 15 city and regional centers were created and 50 regional state archives were changed to variable archives for implementing temporary protection of documents archives.

In 1999 the Law of Azerbaijan "On National Archive Foundation" was adopted.

In 2002, the National Archive Office of the Azerbaijani Republic was established "On Improving the Archival Works in the Republic of Azerbaijan" on the basis of the General Archive Department under the Cabinet of Ministers of the Azerbaijani Republic by the Decree of the President of Azerbaijan.

At present, the archive system of the Republic of Azerbaijan includes 6 state archives, 15 branches of state archives, state archives of Nakhchivan Autonomous Republic, as well as 55 city and regional state archives.

== See also ==
- Cabinet of Azerbaijan
- National Library of Azerbaijan
- List of archives in Azerbaijan
- List of national archives
