= Urbatagirk =

Book by Hakob Meghapart

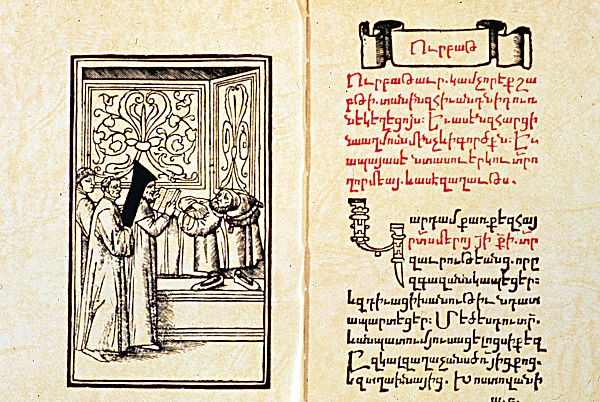
- Author: Hakob Meghapart
- Language: Armenian
- Subject: Christianity
- Publisher: Hakob Meghapart
- Publication date: 1512
- Publication place: Italy
- Pages: 124 paper pages (24 colored)

Urbatagirk (Armenian: Ուրբաթագիրք), or "The Book of Friday", was the first printed book in the Armenian language. It was printed in Venice (Italy) in 1512 by Hakob Meghapart. Its content was partly religious, partly secular, consisting of cures and prayers for the sick, ancient writings, myths, long quotations from Grigor Narekatsi's Book of Lamentations, the Prayer of Cyprianos of Antioch, the story of the Virgin and Justinian, etc.

Urbatagirk comprised 62 sheets (124 unnumbered pages) printed in red and black ink, including 24 illustrations. The type style was designed to imitate manuscript writing. The red ink is used in the beginning of the book and in only specific sections. The book is written in bologir (cursive) style in Classical Armenian. The illustrations were reused woodcuts originally produced for European publications, with some of them altered slightly in order to appear more Armenian (such as the addition of black hoods to images of Catholic priests so that they looked like Armenian priests).

The National Library of Armenia and the Mekhitarist Congregation at the San Lazzaro degli Armeni near Venice each have a copy of Urbatagirk.

== See also ==
- Hakob Meghapart
- Armenian printing
- Global spread of the printing press

== Links ==
- An e-Copy
