= Khachatur Kesaratsi =

Armenian bishop, founder of the first printing house in the Middle East

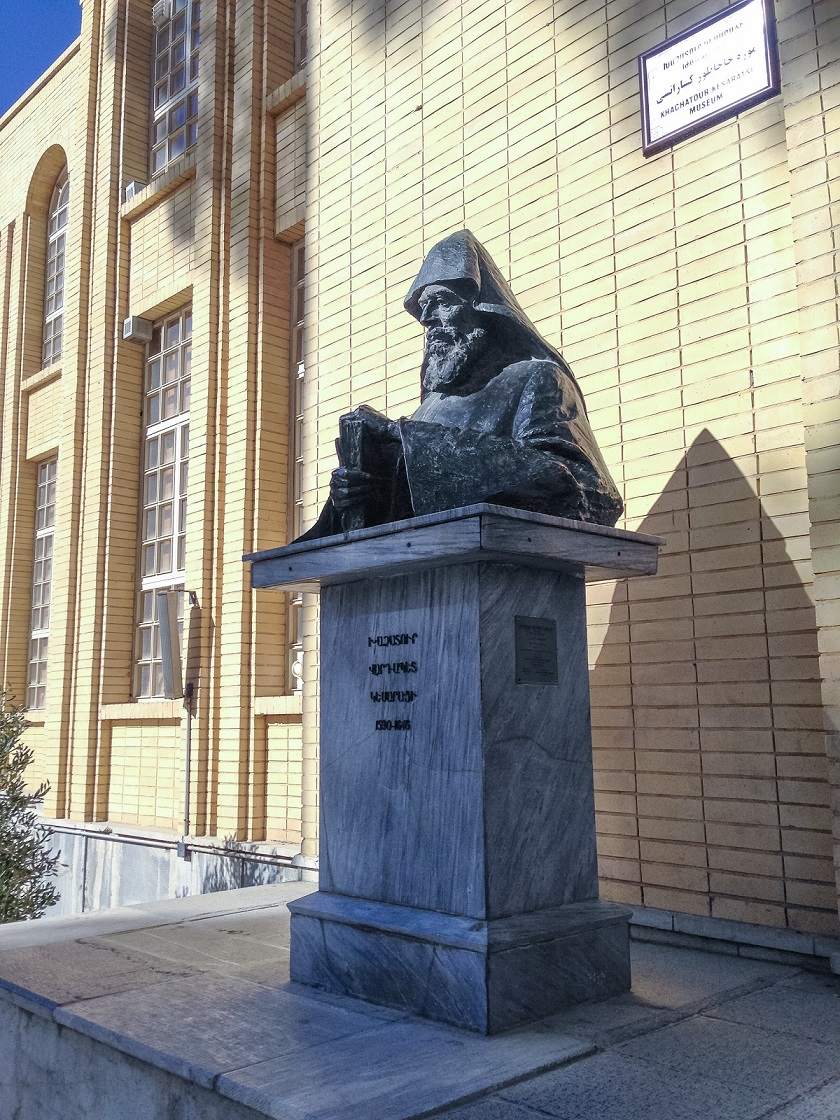
- Statue of Khachatur Kesaratsi in front of the museum dedicated to him, in New Julfa
- Born: 1590; Caesarea, Ottoman Empire
- Died: 1646 (aged 55-56); New Julfa, Safavid Iran
- Occupations: Archbishop, printer
- Known for: First printing press in Iran

Khachatur Kesaratsi (Armenian: Խաչատուր Կեսարացի; 1590–1646) was an Armenian archbishop in Safavid Iran. He is credited with the founding of the first printing press in Iran, in 1633, or 1636. In 1638, the first book was printed; a Saghmosaran (Psalter).

== Sources ==
- Berberian, Houri (2001). Armenians and the Iranian Constitutional Revolution of 1905-1911: "the Love for Freedom Has No Fatherland". Westview Press. ISBN 978-0813338170.
- Ghougassian, Vazken S. (2009). "JULFA i. SAFAVID PERIOD". Encyclopaedia Iranica, Vol. XV, Fasc. 2; Vol. XV, Fasc. 3. pp. 325–326, 225–231.
- Hacikyan, Agop Jack; Basmaijan, Gabriel; Franchuk, Edward S.; Ouzounian, Nourhan, eds. (2005). "The Heritage of Armenian Literature". The Heritage of Armenian Literature: From the eighteenth century to modern times. Detroit: Wayne State University Press. ISBN 978-0814332214.
