= Lithuanian Special Archives =

Lietuvos ypatingasis archyvas
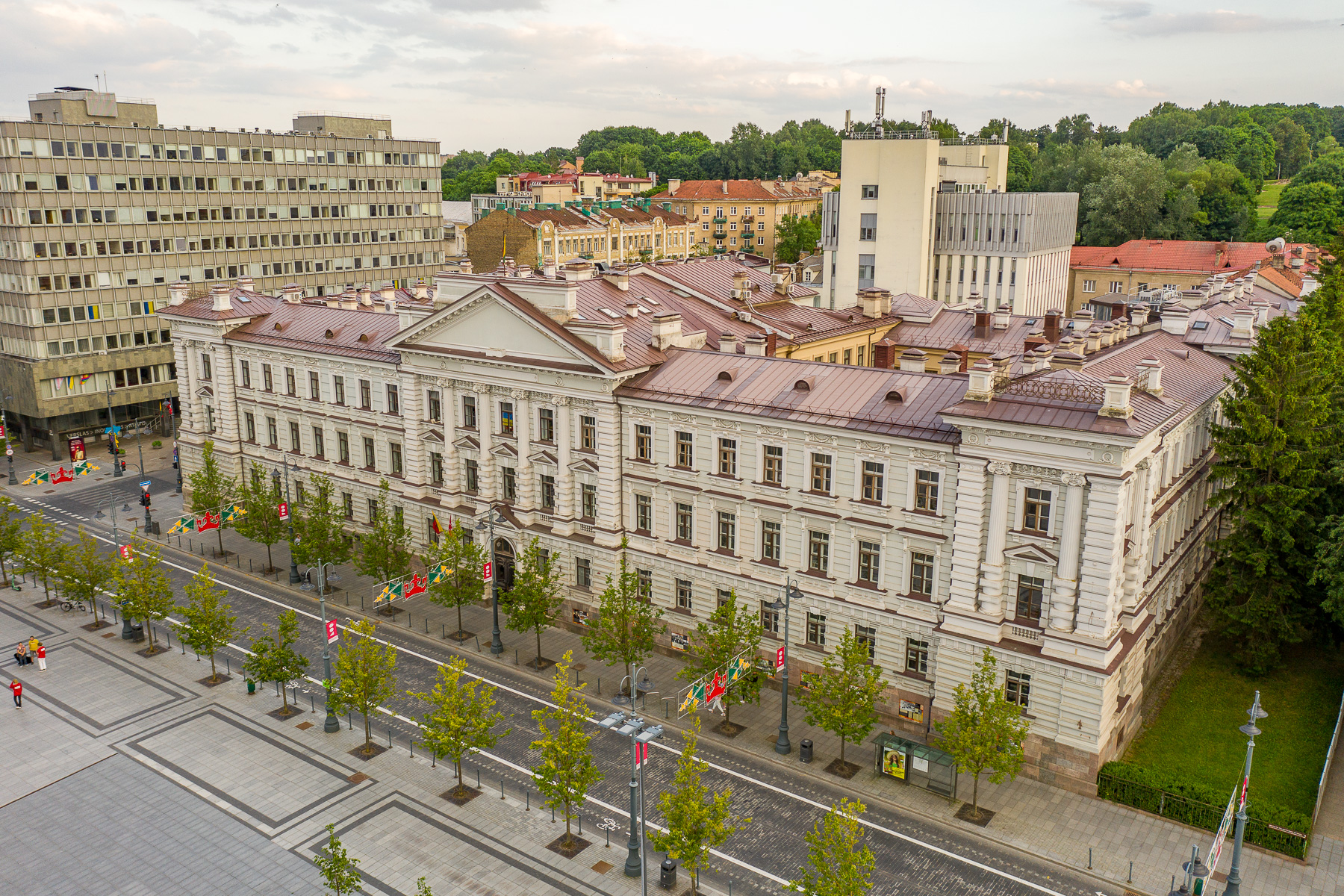
- Headquarters
- Interactive map of Lietuvos ypatingasis archyvas
- 54.6883°N 25.2713°E
- Alternative name: Lithuanian Special Archives
- Location: Gedimins ave. 40, LT-01110, Vilnius, Lithuania
- Type: National archives
- Established: 1995
- Affiliation: Office of the Chief Archivist
- Period covered: 1940–1991
- Website: lya.archyvai.lrv.lt

Lithuanian Special Archives (Lithuanian: Lietuvos ypatingasis archyvas or LYA) is an archive in Vilnius, Lithuania for the storage of documents from the period of the Soviet occupation (1940–1991). Established in 1995, the Special Archives are maintained by the Office of the Chief Archivist of Lithuania.

== History ==
Many documents were left by the Soviet authorities in Lithuania after it restored its independence in 1990. Due to the sensitive nature of the documents, they are held in a separate archive. The Special Archives were established as a separate archive on 10 October 1995. At the time, it contained about 787,000 archival record units of the former Lithuanian KGB stored at the former KGB headquarters on Gediminas Avenue. In 1997, about 1.2 million archival record units of the Ministry of Interior of the Lithuanian SSR (a branch of MVD) were transferred to the archive. In 2000, archive of the Lithuanian Communist Party and related organizations became a department of the Special Archives.

== Holdings ==
As of 2019, the archive held 7,855 fonds and 1.35 million archival record units that take up nearly 18,000 linear metres of shelves. The archive also holds 3.9 million microfilms, about 0.4 million microfiches, and 1.8 million digital files.

=== Primary collections ===
The archive holds documents of Soviet state security agencies (NKVD, NKGB, MVD, MGB, KGB) for the periods 1940–1941 and 1944–1990. These files include personnel files of KGB agents, arrest and interrogation records of political prisoners and Lithuanian partisans, surveillance records of various Lithuanian political, cultural, and religious leaders. It is the largest cache of KGB documents in the Baltic states and reflects all aspects of KGB's activities.

Documents of the Lithuanian Ministry of Interior (NKVD and MVD) include various documents from prisons, hospitals, and schools. More sensitive documents relate to prisoners of war and NKVD filtration camps as well as Soviet deportations from Lithuania. The documents also contain information on various NKVD units, including SMERSH, operating in Lithuania.

The archive of the Lithuanian Communist Party holds various documents from the end of the 19th century related to the Social Democratic Party of Lithuania, Social Democracy of the Kingdom of Poland and Lithuania, Polish Socialist Party, General Jewish Labour Bund, and other workers', social democratic, socialist, and communist parties and groups. The archive includes documents of the Lithuanian Communist Party when it was an underground organization in independent Lithuania (1918–1940). However, majority of the archive is dedicated to the Lithuanian Communist Party and the Lithuanian Komsomol from 1940 to 1990.

=== Other collections ===
Other collections include documents of the Baltic Military District, Society Tėviškė (KGB-sponsored cultural organization that maintained contacts with Lithuanians abroad), Mothers' Union of Lithuanian Soldiers (information on Lithuanian soldiers who were injured or killed in the Red Army from 1945 to 1991), military commissariats (conscription lists, lists of World War II soldiers, etc.).

The archive holds testimonies submitted in 1986–1990 to a government commission investigating Soviet violence in 1941–1953 (NKVD prisoner massacres, robberies and murders committed by the Soviet partisans, excesses of NKVD and extermination battalions in post-war years). Archive's collections also include documents of anti-Soviet Lithuanian partisans (Union of Lithuanian Freedom Fighters and several partisan military districts), memoirs and testimonials of people repressed by the Soviets (partisans, political prisoners, deportees).

The archive also holds copies of documents held in Russia, Kazakhstan (mainly files related to Lithuanian deportees), and Poland (mainly about the Lithuanian minority in Poland and repatriation of Poles in 1955–1959).

== Controversy ==
Access to documents kept at the Special Archives is subject to controversy. Information about KGB agents and informants is particularly sensitive as several prominent Lithuanian politicians were accused of collaborating with KGB. It is estimated that about 118,000 people assisted KGB between 1940 and 1991. Many of their documents were destroyed (about 36,200 files) or taken to Russia (about 8,500 files).

In March 2004, Seimas (Lithuanian parliament) passed new law on archives. This law restricted the access to KGB and MVD documents for 70 years after their creation. Only historians who received special permission could view the files. This stirred controversy and a case challenging the law was submitted to the Constitutional Court of Lithuania. The law was revised in December 2006 which removed the restrictions, except for personal files of people who agreed to collaborate with the Soviet security agencies. Access to such files is limited until after 30 years after person's death.

== Directors ==
Archive's directors were:

- Arūnas Bubnys (1995–1998)
- Ovidijus Lėveris (1998–2024)
- Remigijus Černius (since 2024)
