= National Library of Armenia =

Coordinates: 40°11′24″N 44°31′24″E

- Հայաստանի ազգային գրադարան

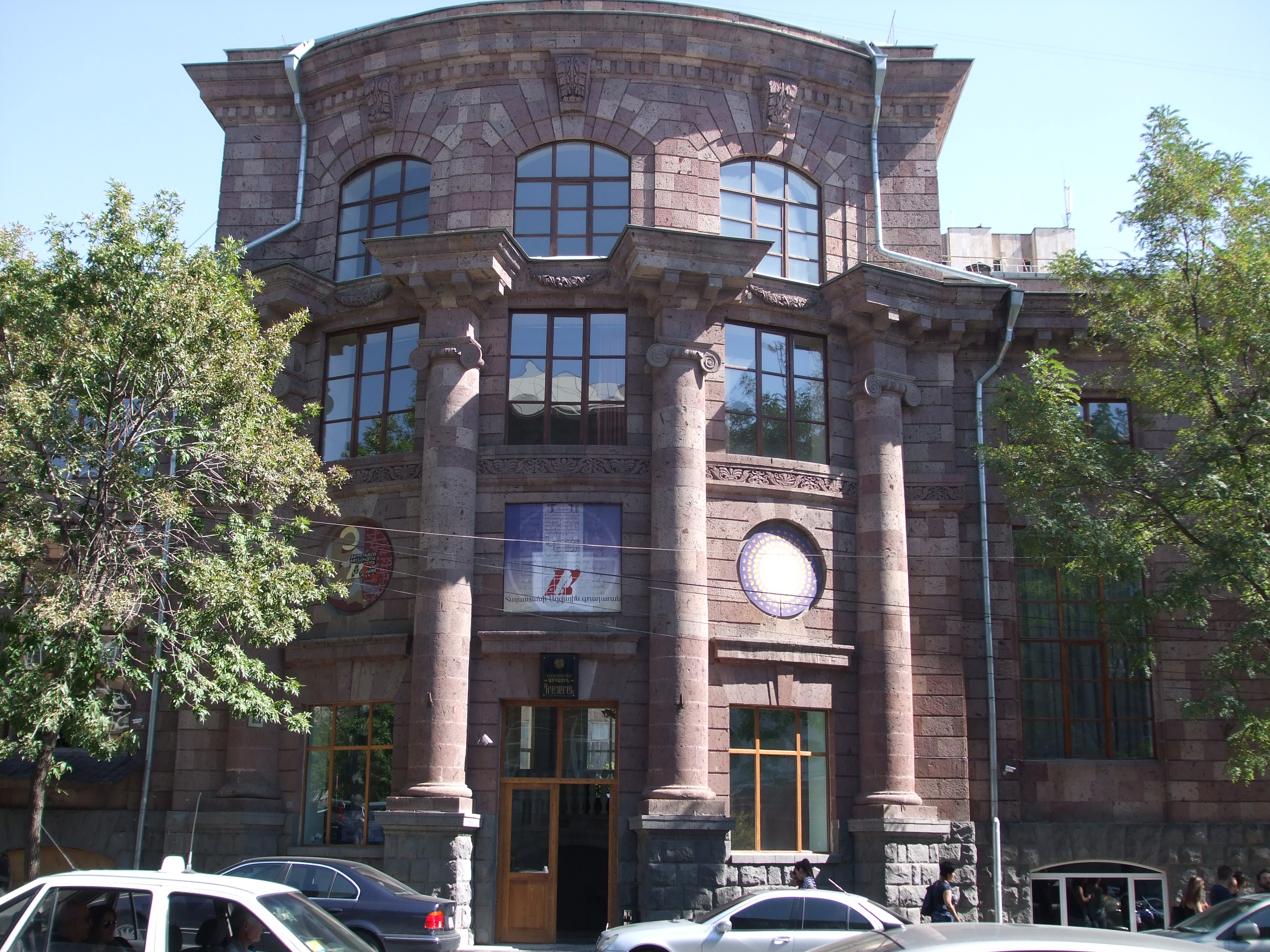
- The main entrance to the building
- Location: Yerevan, Armenia, Armenia
- Type: National Library
- Established: 1832 (194 years ago)

Collection
- Size: 6.6M items

Access and use
- Access requirements: passport and two photos
- Population served: ~1000 per day

Other information
- Director: Anna Chulyan
- Website: nla.am

The National Library of Armenia (Armenian: Հայաստանի ազգային գրադարան, romanized: Hayastani azgayin gradaran) is a national public library in Yerevan, Armenia. It was founded in 1832 as part of the state gymnasium-school of Yerevan. During the Soviet era, from 1925 to 1990, it was named after the Armenian Bolshevik revolutionary and statesman Alexander Miasnikian. The library is the official cultural repository for the entire Armenian republic.

== History ==
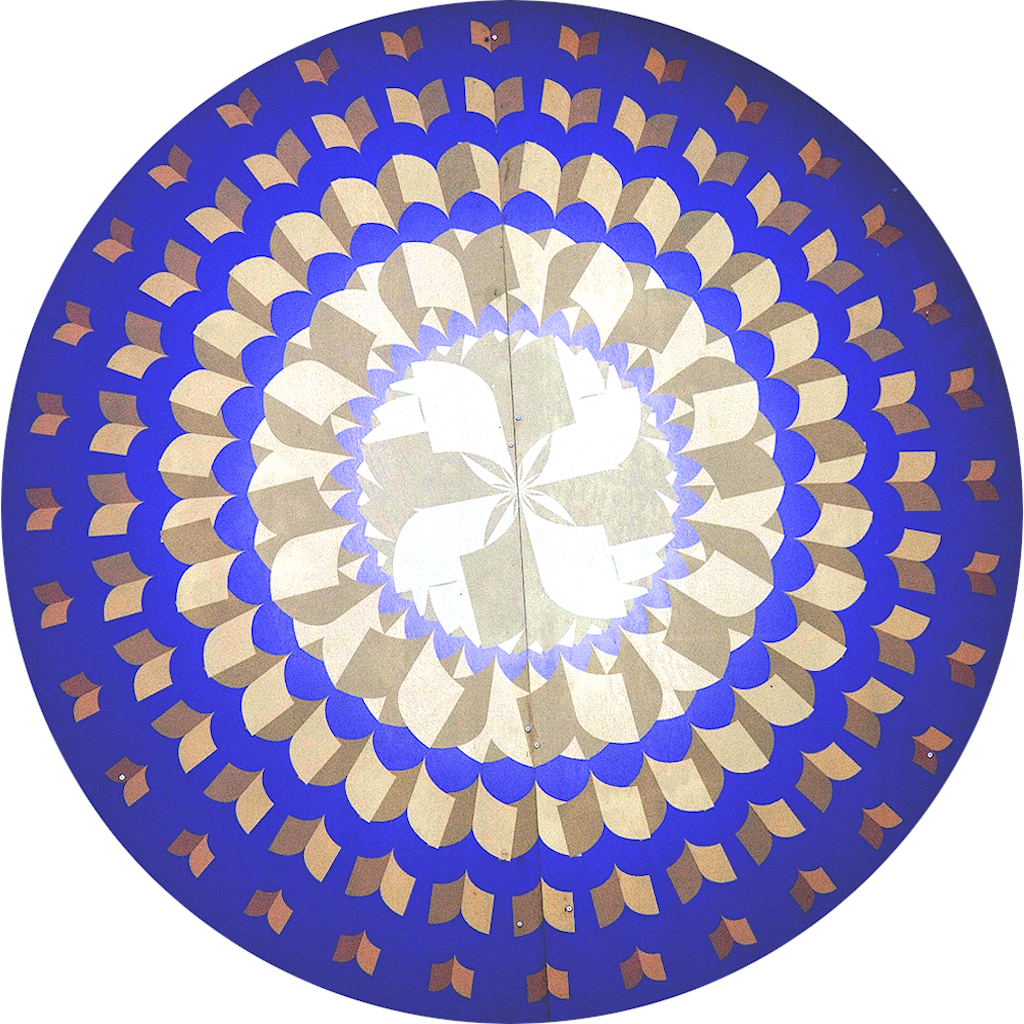
Official emblem of the library.

The National Library of Armenia is the largest world repository of Armenian publishing products and the center of the national bibliography. Being a scientific, cultural, and information institution, the NLA creates the necessary conditions for collecting, processing, preserving, and disseminating the Armenian printed cultural heritage. The NLA is the national bibliographic center of Armenia.

The National Library collections were formed based on the personal libraries of prominent state, public and cultural figures, as well as the collections of educational institutions. Currently, the library is home to a collection of 6.6 million books.

The library possesses an abundant fund consisting of various collections (books, journals, periodicals, dissertations, and synopsis, etc.), of which especially noticeable is the first Armenian printed book, "Urbatagirk" (The book of Friday, Venice, 1512.), the first Armenian periodical publication "Azdarar" (Bulletin, Madras, 1794–1796) as well as the first printed map in Armenian "Hamatarats Ashkharacuyc" (Universal World Map, Amsterdam, 1695).

In 2012, the decision to digitalize the collections was made to provide open access to the unique collections of NLA. Today the digital collections of Armenian books and periodical production count more than ten million digitalized pages.

On the 4 July 1919, during the council meeting of the ministers of Armenia, a law regarding "The national public book depository" was adopted. Since 1999, 4 July is celebrated as the Day of the National Library of Armenia. In 2019, the day of the law's adoption celebrated its 100th anniversary.

The library is located in four buildings within the Kentron district of Yerevan. The oldest of them all – the main building – was built according to the project of Alexander Tamanyan in 1939 and meant to house around seven million books. The building features a special spatial and architectural style, the principle of uniqueness of early and medieval Armenian architecture received a new interpretation and quality and was established as the "Tamanyan style". The library's main building has gained the status of a historical and cultural architectural monument.

On 25 September 2017, the Museum of Book printing was opened inside the National Library of Armenia, where the history of book publishing is displayed in six halls; The Origins of the Book, The Armenian alphabet, The Early adopters of Armenian book printing, Diaspora of the Armenian book publishing, Typography and Immortality of Writing. As an exhibit, the museum displays rare books, book printing machines, and other unique artifacts.

The NLA cooperates with numerous national and leading libraries worldwide. The collection of NLA is annually replenished with copies of world literature through international book-sharing. The NLA cooperates with accredited embassies operating in Armenia, international organizations, and representatives of the Armenian diaspora, thereby contributing to the spread of the Armenian cultural heritage throughout the world.

== Oldest units ==
- The oldest printed book in the library is Urbatagirk, published in Venice, 1512.
- The oldest map in the library dates back to 1695, published in Amsterdam.
- The oldest newspaper in the library is Azdarar, published in Madras, 1794.

== Directors of the Armenian National Library ==
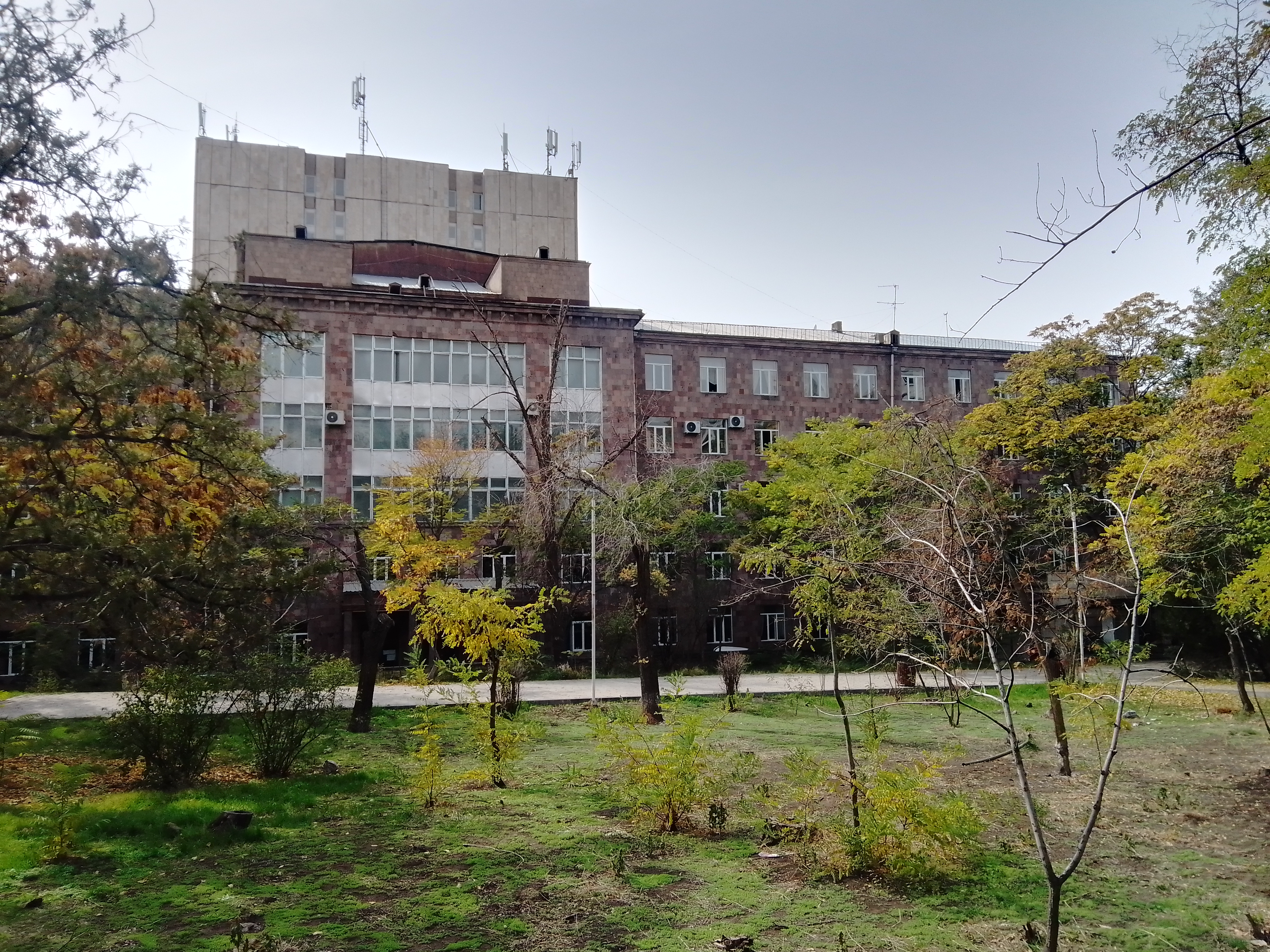
New buildings of the National Library of Armenia.

- Stepan Kanayan (1919–1921)
- Yervand Taghianosyan (1922–1928)
- Mamikon Gevorgyan (1928–1930)
- Azat Martikyan (1930–1936)
- Temsa Zakaryan (1936–1937)
- Aghavni Stepanyan (1937–1953)
- Armenak Mirzoyan (1953–1956)
- Arazi Tirabyan (1956–1989)
- Henrik Liloyan (1989–1991)
- Raphael Ishkhanyan (1991–1995)
- Gevorg Ter-Vardanyan (1995–1998)
- Davit Sargsyan (1998–2011)
- Tigran Zargaryan (2011–2019)
- Anna Chulyan (2020–present)

== Sections ==
Sections within the Armenian National Library include:

- Replenishment section General stack
- Section of collaboration, book-exchange and departments
- Section of Armenian Literature amendments and directory organizing
- Section of foreign literature amendments and directory organizing General stack
- Section of services
- Section of Intact literature
- Section of arts literature and non-bookish publication
- Section of bibliography and library-science
- Section of public relations and events organizing
- Section of publications registration and indexing
- Section of literature's popularization
- Centre of observations of libraric GRID technologies
- Section of printed production's restoration and publishing services
- Section of foreign relations
- Letterpress museum

== Museum of Typography ==
On 25 September 2017, the Museum of Typography, was opened in the National Library of Armenia. The history of printing is reflected in six halls of the museum of Typography. In the Hall of the "Origins of Writing", samples of the written culture created in the period from the pre-writing period to the writing period are presented: rock paintings, cuneiform inscriptions. "The Armenian alphabet" hall presents the types of writing and the woodcut Armenian alphabet in the books of European publishers.

== See also ==
- Armenian literature
- List of libraries in Armenia
- List of national and state libraries
- Matenadaran
