= Presidential library system =

Research library with the collection of a U.S. president's papers

Official seal of the presidential libraries

The United States presidential library system is a nationwide network of 13 libraries administered by the Office of Presidential Libraries, which is part of the National Archives and Records Administration (NARA). These are repositories for preserving and making available the papers, records, collections and other historical materials of every president of the United States since Herbert Hoover (31st president, 1929–1933). In addition to the library services, museum exhibitions concerning the presidency are displayed.

Although recognized as having historical significance, before the mid-20th century presidential papers and effects were generally understood to be the private property of the president. Franklin D. Roosevelt (32nd president, 1933–1945) proposed to leave his papers to the public in a building donated by him on his Hyde Park, New York, estate. Since then, a series of laws established the public keeping of documents and the presidential library system. These laws now seek to create a public archive library for each presidential term, with NARA taking control of the library documents immediately upon expiration of a term of office. Additional provisions govern when the documents are made available to the public. While not sanctioned and maintained by NARA, libraries and museums have also been organized for several presidents who preceded Hoover and the official start of the Presidential Library Office.

The sites in the 20th century were called, "presidential library and museum", but those built in the 21st century are called, presidential center. Since the Barack Obama Presidential Center (44th president, 2009–2017), it operates under a new model, providing fully digitized records that are preserved, and administered by NARA with archival materials lent to the privately operated Presidential Center for display.

== Overview ==
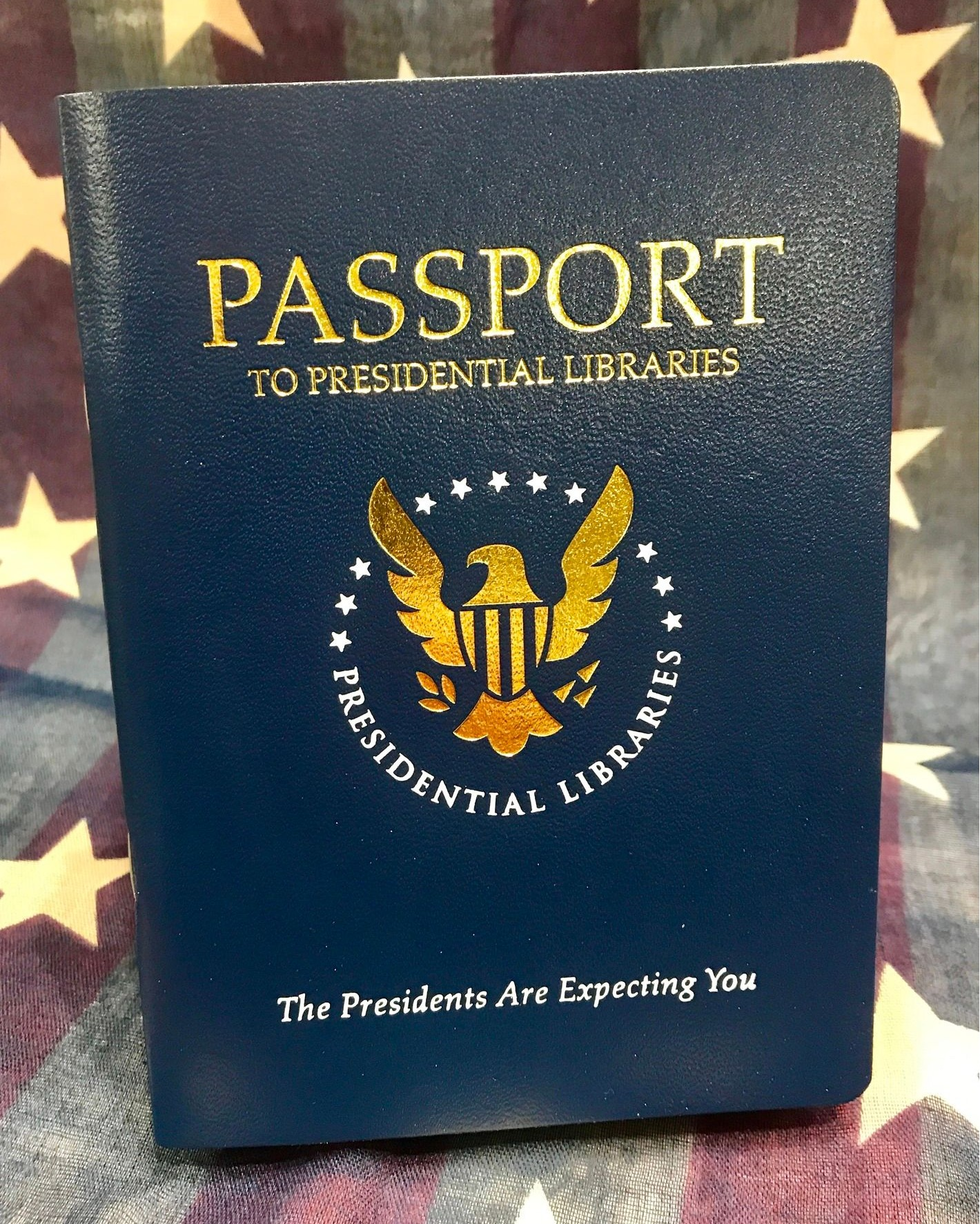
NARA Presidential Libraries Passport

For every president since Herbert Hoover, presidential libraries have been established in each president's home state in which documents, artifacts, gifts of state and museum exhibits are maintained that relate to the former president's life and career both political and professional. Each library also provides an active series of public programs. When a president leaves office, the National Archives and Records Administration (NARA) establishes a presidential materials project to house and index the documents until they are required by law to make them available to the public, either in a library building or digitally.

The first officially designated presidential library is the Franklin D. Roosevelt Presidential Library and Museum, dedicated on June 30, 1941. The George W. Bush Presidential Center became the thirteenth on May 1, 2013.

The National Archives and Records Administration uses a passport to promote visiting the presidential libraries. When a person visits every library, NARA awards them a crystal paperweight.

=== Presidential libraries outside NARA ===
Locations of the NARA-administered (red) and other (blue) U.S. presidential libraries

The presidential library system is made up of thirteen presidential libraries operated fully, or partially, by NARA. (Note: NARA and the Obama Foundation are partnering in a new model, digitizing the Obama presidential records but not creating a new NARA facility.) Libraries and museums have been established for earlier presidents, but they are not part of the NARA presidential library system, and are operated by private foundations, historical societies, or state governments, including the James K. Polk, William McKinley, Rutherford B. Hayes, Calvin Coolidge, Abraham Lincoln and Woodrow Wilson libraries. For example, the Abraham Lincoln Presidential Library and Museum is owned and operated by the state of Illinois.

The Richard Nixon Library and Birthplace was not originally part of the presidential library system. While the Nixon Presidential Materials Staff, which administers the Nixon presidential materials under the terms of the Presidential Recordings and Materials Preservation Act, is part of NARA, the private nonprofit Richard Nixon Foundation owned and operated the Richard Nixon Library & Birthplace. In January 2004, Congress passed legislation that provided for the establishment of a federally operated Richard Nixon Presidential Library in Yorba Linda, California. In March 2005, the Archivist of the United States and John Taylor, the director of the Richard Nixon Library & Birthplace Foundation, exchanged letters on the requirements to allow the Nixon Library to become the twelfth federally funded presidential library operated by NARA by 2007, while the Nixon Foundation would continue to own the campus and operate the Nixon Library complex with NARA. On October 16, 2006, Timothy Naftali began his tenure as the first federal director of the Richard Nixon Library and Birthplace, and in the winter of 2006 NARA began to transfer the 30,000 presidential gifts from the Nixon Presidential Materials Staff in College Park, Maryland, to the Yorba Linda facility. On July 11, 2007, NARA began its operations at the Nixon Library site and the facility's name was changed to Richard Nixon Presidential Library and Museum.

In May 2012, on the fiftieth anniversary of the founding of the Ulysses S. Grant Foundation, it selected Mississippi State University as the permanent location for Ulysses S. Grant's presidential library. Historian John Simon edited Grant's letters into a 32-volume scholarly edition published by Southern Illinois University Press.

On April 30, 2013, both chambers of the North Dakota Legislative Assembly passed a bill appropriating $12 million to Dickinson State University to award a grant to the Theodore Roosevelt Center for construction of a building to be named the Theodore Roosevelt Presidential Library. To access these funds, the Theodore Roosevelt Center must first raise $3 million from non-state sources. Dickinson State University is also home to the Theodore Roosevelt Digital Library which has formed partnerships with the Library of Congress and Harvard University, among other institutions. They currently have over 25,000 items online.

On April 12, 2016, Harding 2020, a collaboration between the Harding Home, Ohio History Connection, and Marion Technical College, detailed plans to spend $7.3 million to establish the Warren G. Harding Presidential Center. Plans include restoring the Harding Home, Warren G. Harding's historic home in Marion, Ohio, and its grounds to its 1920 appearance. A 15,000-square-foot presidential center and museum was built adjacent to the house. Harding's presidential papers were moved from its previous location at the Ohio History Connection's headquarters in Columbus, Ohio, to the new center. The culmination of the work, was scheduled to be completed by the spring of 2020, to coincide with the 100th anniversary of Harding's election to the presidency. The library was scheduled to open initially on May 23, 2020, with a formal dedication ceremony on Friday, July 17, 2020. This was then delayed until September due largely to back orders on construction materials and other issues. Then, the COVID-19 pandemic delayed the opening of the museum until May 12, 2021

In May 2017, it was announced that the Barack Obama Presidential Center, the planned location of the presidential library of Barack Obama, would not be part of the NARA system, making Obama the first president since Calvin Coolidge not to have a federally owned facility. Instead, in a "new model" the nonprofit Obama Foundation will partner with the NARA on digitization and making documents available. It was announced that the City of Chicago would own the center.

== History ==
Historically, all presidential papers were considered the personal property of the president. Some took them at the end of their terms, others destroyed them, and many papers were scattered. Though many pre-Hoover collections now reside in the Manuscript Division of the Library of Congress, others are split among other libraries, historical societies, and private collections. However, many materials have been lost or (accidentally or deliberately) destroyed.

Lucretia Rudolph Garfield, the wife of James A. Garfield (president from March 4, 1881, until his death on September 19, 1881) added a Memorial Library wing to their family home in Mentor, Ohio, four years after his assassination. The James A. Garfield National Historic Site was operated by the National Park Service and the Western Reserve Historical Society until 2008, when the historical society gave over full control to the National Park Service.

=== National Archives ===
In 1939, President Franklin Delano Roosevelt donated his personal and presidential papers to the federal government. At the same time, Roosevelt pledged part of his estate at Hyde Park, New York, to the United States, and friends of the president formed a non-profit corporation to raise funds for the construction of the library and museum building. Roosevelt's decision stemmed from his belief that presidential papers were an important part of the national heritage and should be accessible to the public. He asked the National Archives to take custody of his papers and other historical materials and to administer his library. On June 30, 2013, new interactive and multimedia exhibits developed by the National Archives and Records Administration (NARA) opened to the public as part of the first renovation of this library since its opening.

In 1950, Harry S. Truman decided that he, too, would build a library to house his presidential papers and helped to galvanize congressional action.

=== Presidential Libraries Act of 1955 ===
In 1955, Congress passed the Presidential Libraries Act of 1955, establishing a system of privately erected and federally maintained libraries. The act encouraged other presidents to donate their historical materials to the government and ensured the preservation of presidential papers and their availability to the people of the United States. Under this and subsequent acts, nine more libraries have been established. In each case, private and non-federal public sources provided the funds to build the library. Generally, once completed the private organization turned over the libraries to the National Archives and Records Administration to operate and maintain. The library and museum founded for Richard Nixon remained privately owned and managed for many years, but his heirs ultimately reached an agreement for it to become a NARA facility.

Until 1978, presidents, scholars, and legal professionals held the view dating back to George Washington that the records created by the president or his staff while in office remained the personal property of the president and were his to take with him when he left office. The first presidential libraries were built on this concept. NARA successfully persuaded presidents to donate their historical materials to the federal government for housing in a presidential library managed by NARA.

=== Deeds of Gift ===
Apart from the presidency of Richard Nixon, the handling of presidential records by NARA for the presidencies of Hoover through Carter (1929–1969, and 1973–1980) are governed by their deeds of gift, whereby the public took ownership of the records of each president.

=== Nixon presidency and the Preservation Act of 1974 ===
In the wake of the Watergate scandal, Congress asserted public ownership and control of materials from the Nixon White House (1969–1973), under the Presidential Recordings and Materials Preservation Act of 1974.

=== Presidential Records Act of 1978 ===
The Presidential Records Act of 1978 established that the presidential records that document the constitutional, statutory, and ceremonial duties of the president are the property of the United States Government. When the president leaves office, the archivist of the United States assumes custody of the records. The act allowed for the continuation of presidential libraries as the repository for presidential records.

=== Presidential Libraries Act of 1986 ===
The Presidential Libraries Act of 1986 made additional changes to presidential libraries, requiring private endowments linked to the size of the facility. NARA uses these endowments to offset a portion of the maintenance costs for the library.

=== Presidential Historical Records Preservation Act of 2008 ===
The Presidential Historical Records Preservation Act of 2008 amended 44 U.S.C. § 2504 to authorize grants for Presidential Centers of Historical Excellence.

=== Effects of changes in the records laws and modern digital records ===
While the libraries for presidents Hoover to George W. Bush eventually conformed to a model whereby the former president funded or fundraised and built a facility for NARA to house the library, presidents are not required to do so under the law (Nixon's was not under NARA for many years). Nonetheless, according to NARA as of 2023, changes in these laws have increased significantly the amount of endowment the former president must raise, if they do decide to build a NARA owned facility, which must be maintained by the federal government. According to NARA, not only are the digital nature of modern records changing the needs, plans, and lessening space requirements of physical storage, but the significantly increased endowment requirement may lessen the likelihood that present and future presidents will continue to build NARA facilities.

== Holdings ==
The thirteen presidential libraries maintain over 400 million pages of textual materials; nearly ten million photographs; over 15 million feet (5,000 km) of motion picture film; nearly 100,000 hours of disc, audiotape, and videotape recordings; and approximately half a million museum objects. These varied holdings make each library a valuable source of information and a center for research on the presidency.

The most important textual materials in each library are those created by the president and his staff in the course of performing the official duties. Libraries also house numerous objects including family heirlooms, items collected by the president and his family, campaign memorabilia, awards, and the many gifts given to the president by American citizens and foreign dignitaries. These gifts range in type from homemade items to valuable works of art. Curators in presidential libraries and in other museums throughout the country draw upon these collections for historical exhibits.

Other significant holdings include the personal papers and historical materials donated by individuals associated with the president. These individuals may include Cabinet officials, envoys to foreign governments, political party associates, and the president's family and personal friends. Several libraries have undertaken oral history programs that have produced tape-recorded memoirs. A third body of materials comprises the papers accumulated by the president prior to, and following, his presidency. Such collections include documents relating to Theodore Roosevelt's tenure as Governor of New York and Dwight D. Eisenhower's long military career.

With the exception of John F. Kennedy, Lyndon B. Johnson, and Jimmy Carter, every American president since Hoover is or has chosen to be buried at his presidential library. Kennedy is buried at Arlington National Cemetery; Johnson is buried at his ranch in the hill country of Texas, west of Austin; Carter is buried near his home in Plains, Georgia. Bill Clinton will be buried at the William Jefferson Clinton Presidential Center in Little Rock. George W. Bush will be buried at the George W. Bush Presidential Center in Dallas. The future burial sites of former 44th president Barack Obama, former 45th and current 47th president Donald Trump, and former 46th president Joe Biden are still unknown.

Unlike all other presidents whose libraries are part of the NARA system, Ford's library and museum are geographically separate buildings, located in different parts of Michigan; Ford is buried at his museum in Grand Rapids, while the library is in Ann Arbor.

== List of presidential libraries ==
This is a list of the presidential libraries.

Denotes libraries outside the NARA Presidential Library Office (all post-Hoover administrations have presidential library holdings administered by NARA, but one will have a physical facility that is outside NARA's ownership, and another remains to be decided).
Denotes library without presidential site or the site houses the presidential collection in part of a general library.
Denotes library where plans are yet to be announced.

#	President	Library name	Location	Operated by	Image	Logo/website
1	George Washington	Fred W. Smith National Library for the Study of George Washington at Mount Vernon; Opened to public September 27, 2013	Mount Vernon, Virginia	Mount Vernon Ladies' Association		_{website}
2	John Adams	Stone Library at Adams National Historical Park; Opened to public 1870	Quincy, Massachusetts	National Park Service (NPS)		_{website}
3	Thomas Jefferson	Robert H. Smith International Center for Jefferson Studies at Monticello; Opened to public 1994	Charlottesville, Virginia	Thomas Jefferson Foundation		_{website}
4	James Madison	The Papers of James Madison at Shannon Library; Opened in 1937, the Papers of James Madison went digital, April 28, 2010.	Charlottesville, Virginia	University of Virginia		_{Montpelier}
5	James Monroe	James Monroe Museum and Memorial Library; Opened to public 1966	Fredericksburg, Virginia	University of Mary Washington		_{website}
7	Andrew Jackson	The Papers of Andrew Jackson at Hoskins Library; Opened to public 1987	Knoxville, Tennessee	University of Tennessee at Knoxville		_{website}
15	James Buchanan	James Buchanan papers at the Historical Society of Pennsylvania; Gift of the Buchanan family; transferred to the Historical Society, c. 1895–1897	Philadelphia, Pennsylvania	Historical Society of Pennsylvania		_{website}
16	Abraham Lincoln	Abraham Lincoln Presidential Library and Museum; Opened to public in 2004	Springfield, Illinois	State of Illinois		_{website}
17	Andrew Johnson	President Andrew Johnson Museum and Library; Opened to public 1993	Tusculum, Tennessee	Tusculum College		_{website}
18	Ulysses S. Grant	Ulysses S. Grant Presidential Library; Opened to public October 15, 1966	Starkville, Mississippi	Mississippi State University Library and Ulysses S. Grant Association		_{website}
19	Rutherford B. Hayes	Rutherford B. Hayes Presidential Center; Opened to public 1916	Fremont, Ohio	Ohio History Connection and Hayes Presidential Center, Inc.		_{website}
22 and 24	Grover Cleveland	Seeley G. Mudd Manuscript Library; Opened to public October 16, 1976	Princeton, New Jersey	Princeton University		_{website}
25	William McKinley	William McKinley Presidential Library and Museum; Memorial/Gravesite opened to the public September 1907	Canton, Ohio	Stark County Historical Society		_{website}
26	Theodore Roosevelt	Theodore Roosevelt Presidential Library; Opened to public July 4, 2026	Medora, North Dakota	Theodore Roosevelt Presidential Library Foundation		_{website}
26	Theodore Roosevelt	Houghton Library; Collection donated in 1943	Cambridge, Massachusetts	Harvard University		_{website}
26	Theodore Roosevelt	The Theodore Roosevelt Center at Dickinson State University; Launched in 2009	Dickinson, North Dakota	Dickinson State University		_{website}
28	Woodrow Wilson	Woodrow Wilson Presidential Library; Opened to the public in 1990	Staunton, Virginia	Woodrow Wilson Presidential Library Foundation		_{website}
28	Woodrow Wilson	Seeley G. Mudd Manuscript Library; Opened to public October 16, 1976	Princeton, New Jersey	Princeton University		_{website}
29	Warren G. Harding	Warren G. Harding Presidential Center; Opened to the public on May 12, 2021	Marion, Ohio	Ohio History Connection		_{website}
30	Calvin Coolidge	Calvin Coolidge Presidential Library and Museum; Opened to the public in 1956	Northampton, Massachusetts	Forbes Library		_{website}
31	Herbert Hoover	Herbert Hoover Presidential Library and Museum; Dedication August 10, 1962; Rededicated August 8, 1992	West Branch, Iowa	National Archives and Records Administration (NARA)		_{website}
32	Franklin D. Roosevelt	Franklin D. Roosevelt Presidential Library and Museum; Dedicated June 30, 1941; Rededicated June 30, 2013	Hyde Park, New York	NARA		_{website}
33	Harry S. Truman	Harry S. Truman Presidential Library and Museum; Dedicated on July 6, 1957; Rededicated December 9, 2001	Independence, Missouri	NARA		_{website}
34	Dwight D. Eisenhower	Dwight D. Eisenhower Presidential Library, Museum and Boyhood Home; Dedicated on May 1, 1962; Rededicated on October 7, 2019	Abilene, Kansas	NARA		_{website}
35	John F. Kennedy	John F. Kennedy Presidential Library and Museum; Dedicated on October 20, 1979; Rededicated October 29, 1993	Boston, Massachusetts	NARA		_{website}
36	Lyndon B. Johnson	Lyndon Baines Johnson Library and Museum; Dedicated on May 22, 1971	Austin, Texas	NARA and The University of Texas at Austin		_{website}
37	Richard Nixon	Richard Nixon Presidential Library and Museum; Dedicated on July 19, 1990; Rededicated October 14, 2016	Yorba Linda, California	NARA and Richard Nixon Foundation		_{website}
38	Gerald Ford	Gerald R. Ford Presidential Museum; Dedicated on September 18, 1981; Rededicated April 17, 1997	Grand Rapids, Michigan	NARA		_{website}
38	Gerald Ford	Gerald R. Ford Presidential Library; Dedicated on April 27, 1981	Ann Arbor, Michigan	NARA		_{website}
39	Jimmy Carter	Jimmy Carter Presidential Library and Museum; Dedicated on October 1, 1986	Atlanta, Georgia	NARA		_{website}
40	Ronald Reagan	Ronald Reagan Presidential Library and Museum; Dedicated on November 4, 1991	Simi Valley, California	NARA		_{website}
41	George H. W. Bush	George H. W. Bush Presidential Library and Museum; Dedicated on November 6, 1997	College Station, Texas	NARA and Texas A&M University		_{website}
42	Bill Clinton	William J. Clinton Presidential Center and Park; Dedicated on November 18, 2004	Little Rock, Arkansas	NARA		_{website}
43	George W. Bush	George W. Bush Presidential Center; Dedicated on April 25, 2013	Dallas, Texas	NARA and Southern Methodist University		_{website}
44	Barack Obama	Barack Obama Presidential Library	Digital, NARA facilities	NARA		_{website}
44	Barack Obama	Barack Obama Presidential Center; Dedicated on June 18, 2026	Chicago, Illinois	Obama Foundation and University of Chicago		_{website}
45 and 47	Donald Trump	Donald J. Trump Presidential Library	Digital, NARA facilities	NARA		_{website}
45 and 47	Donald Trump	Donald J. Trump Presidential Center (in planning)	Miami, Florida	Miami Dade College		
46	Joe Biden	Joseph R. Biden Jr. Presidential Library	Digital, NARA facilities	NARA		_{website}
46	Joe Biden	Joseph R. Biden Jr. Presidential Center (in planning)	Delaware			

== Locations of other presidents' papers ==
Grover Cleveland and Woodrow Wilson left their papers to Princeton University, where they may be found at the Seeley G. Mudd Manuscript Library. The Theodore Roosevelt Association collected Theodore Roosevelt's papers and donated them to Harvard University in 1943, where they reside at its Widener and Houghton libraries.

James Buchanan left his papers to the Historical Society of Pennsylvania in Philadelphia, where they may still be found. The Papers of Andrew Jackson is a project sponsored by the University of Tennessee at Knoxville to collect Andrew Jackson's papers on microfilm. A microfilm edition of Martin Van Buren's papers was produced at Pennsylvania State University in 1987; a digital edition of the Papers of Martin Van Buren is being produced at Cumberland University. A similar project is underway on behalf of James Madison by the Universities of Virginia and Chicago.

For many presidents, especially before the development of the NARA system, substantial collections may be found in multiple private and public collections. Until the Obama administration's library is ready for service, its papers are being held in a facility in Hoffman Estates, Illinois, and except for classified materials are available through FOIA since 2023.

== See also ==
- United States presidential memorials
- National Archives facilities § Presidential libraries
- First Ladies National Historic Site
- Jefferson Davis Presidential Library and Museum
- Gladstone's Library
- Churchill Archives Centre
- National Churchill Museum
- Diefenbaker Canada Centre
- Vicente Fox Center of Studies, Library and Museum
- Quayle Vice Presidential Learning Center
- Olusegun Obasanjo Presidential Library
- World's Smallest Presidential Library (David Rice Atchison)
- Perdana Leadership Foundation
