= Presidential library =

A presidential library, presidential center, or presidential museum is a facility either created in honor of a former president and containing their papers, or affiliated with a country's presidency.

== In the United States ==
Locations of the NARA-administered (red) and other (blue) U.S. presidential libraries
- The presidential library system, a network of 16 government-run libraries, plus a number of privately-run ones
- Jefferson Davis Presidential Library and Museum in Biloxi, Mississippi, a privately owned library named after Jefferson Davis, president of the secessionist Confederate States
- Presidential Museum and Leadership Library in Odessa, Texas, about presidents in general
- World's Smallest Presidential Library in Atchison County, Kansas, a museum exhibit about David Rice Atchison, who, it has been asserted, was Acting President of the United States for one day

== In other countries ==
- Presidential Library in Baku, Azerbaijan, established in 2003
- Presidential Library in Minsk, Belarus, a research library
- Saakashvili Presidential Library in Tbilisi, Georgia, named after former president Mikheil Saakashvili
- South Korea:
  - Kim Dae-jung Presidential Library & Museum in Seoul, named after former president Kim Dae-jung
  - Park Chung-hee Presidential Museum in Gumi, named after former president Park Chung-hee
- Vicente Fox Center of Studies, Library and Museum in San Cristóbal, Guanajuato, Mexico, named after former president Vicente Fox
- Olusegun Obasanjo Presidential Library in Abeokuta, Ogun State, Nigeria, named after former president Chief Olusegun Obasanjo
- Boris Yeltsin Presidential Library in Saint Petersburg, Russia, named after Boris Yeltsin, first president of the Russian Federation
- J. R. Jayewardene Centre in Colombo, Sri Lanka, named after Junius Richard Jayewardene, first executive president of Sri Lanka
- Taiwan (Republic of China):
  - Chiang Ching-kuo Presidential Library in Taipei, named after former president Chiang Ching-kuo
  - Presidential and Vice-Presidential Artifacts Museum in Taipei, with archives from various presidents and vice presidents of the country
- Presidential Library in Ankara, Turkey, the largest library in the country
