= USS LST-60 =

1943 LST-1-class tank landing ship

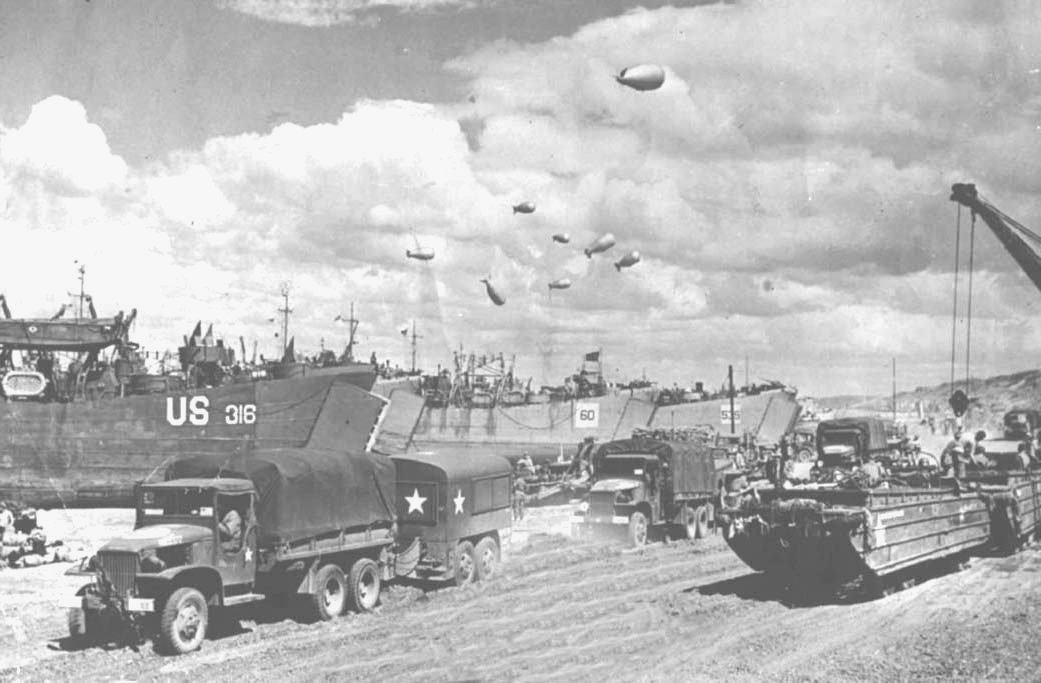
- USS LST-316, LST-60, and USS LST-535 beached at Normandy, June 1944

History

United States
- Name: USS LST-60
- Builder: Dravo Corporation, Pittsburgh, Pennsylvania
- Laid down: 14 November 1943
- Launched: 24 December 1943
- Commissioned: 7 February 1944
- Decommissioned: 27 June 1946
- Honors and awards: 1 battle star (WWII)
- Renamed: USS Atchison County (LST-60), 1 July 1955
- Namesake: Atchison County, Kansas, Atchison County, Missouri
- Stricken: 1 November 1958
- Fate: Sold commercial broken up August 1973

General characteristics
- Class & type: LST-1-class tank landing ship
- Displacement: 1,625 long tons (1,651 t) light; 4,080 long tons (4,145 t) full
- Length: 328 ft (100 m)
- Beam: 50 ft (15 m)
- Draft: Unloaded: Bow: 2 ft 4 in (0.71 m); Stern: 7 ft 6 in (2.29 m); Loaded : Bow: 8 ft 2 in (2.49 m); Stern: 14 ft 1 in (4.29 m)
- Depth: 8 ft (2.4 m) forward, 14 ft 4 in (4.37 m) aft (full load)
- Propulsion: 2 General Motors 12-567 diesel engines, two shafts, twin rudders
- Speed: 12 knots (22 km/h; 14 mph)
- Boats & landing craft carried: Two or six LCVPs
- Troops: 14–16 officers, 131–147 enlisted men
- Complement: 7–9 officers, 104–120 enlisted men
- Armament: 2 × twin 40 mm gun mounts w/Mk.51 directors; 4 × single 40 mm gun mounts; 12 × single 20 mm gun mounts

USS Atchison County (LST-60) was an LST-1-class tank landing ship that was built for the United States Navy during World War II. Named for counties in Kansas and Missouri established in honor of David Rice Atchison, a mid-nineteenth century Democratic United States Senator from Missouri, she was the only U.S. Naval vessel to bear the name.

LST-60 was laid down on 14 November 1943 at Neville Island in Pittsburgh, Pennsylvania by the Dravo Corporation.Launched on 24 December, she was sponsored by Mrs. Daniel W. Mack and placed in reduced commission on 24 January 1944 so that she might descend the Ohio and Mississippi Rivers under her own power to New Orleans, where she was placed in full commission on 7 February.

== Service history ==
The new tank landing ship held shakedown training off Panama City, Florida, from 19 February to 4 March; she then returned to New Orleans for repairs and loading.

She next moved to New York City, where she took additional cargo on board for transportation to the United Kingdom. After crossing the Atlantic in convoy, LST-60 safely arrived in Falmouth, United Kingdom, on 2 May.

From there, she proceeded to Southend-on-Sea to load for the Normandy invasion. LST-60 sailed from Southend on 5 June with Commander, Group 3, and embarked for the initial assault. Following the successful unloading of troops and cargo at Normandy the next day, the ship commenced cross-channel operations, making fifty-three trips to the French mainland without mishap before being ordered back to the United States for overhaul. Escorting a convoy en route, LST-60 safely arrived in Norfolk, Virginia on 1 July 1945 and continued on to New Orleans for repairs.

Originally scheduled to join the Pacific Fleet following overhaul, LST-60 received new orders with the end of the war on 15 August. Instead, she proceeded to Green Cove Springs, Florida for inactivation and was placed out of commission, in reserve, on 27 June 1946.

The name USS Atchison County was assigned to LST-60 on 1 July 1955. In 1958, the tank landing ship was declared unfit for further naval service. Her name was struck from the Naval Vessel Register on 1 November 1958.

She was sold for commercial use and renamed Elmar in 1962 being scrapped in August 1973.

LST-60 earned one battle star for World War II service.

== Gallery ==
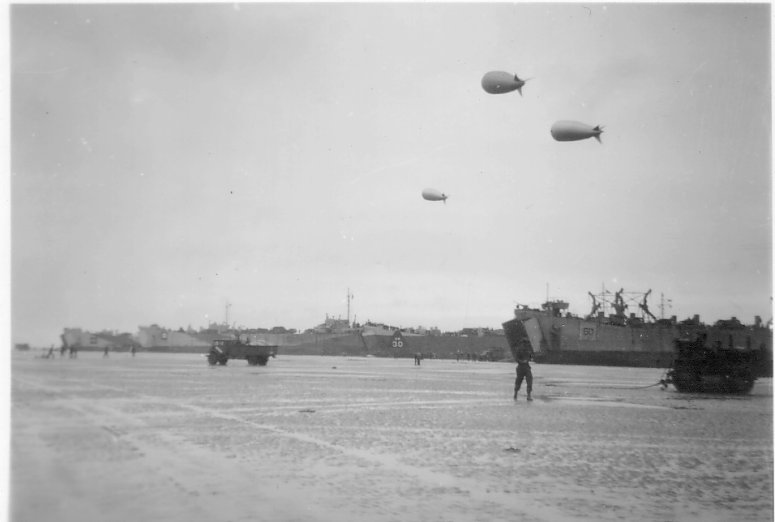
LST-60 and USS LST-30 along with two unidentified LSTs beached at Normandy, after 6 June 1944
