= USS LST-316 =

WWII tank carrier ship

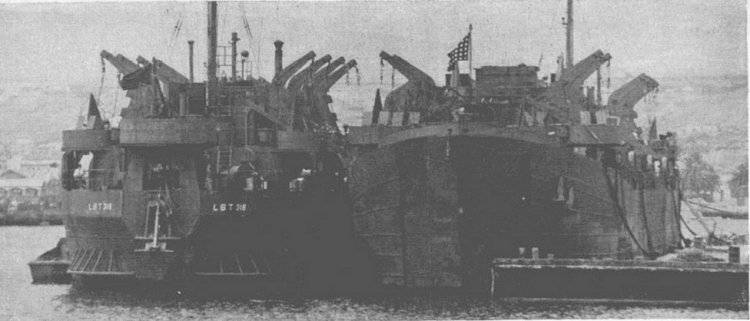
- LST-316 moored bow-to-stern with an unidentified LST

History

United States
- Name: USS LST-316
- Builder: New York Navy Yard
- Laid down: 7 September 1942
- Launched: 28 January 1943
- Commissioned: 3 February 1943
- Decommissioned: 24 May 1945
- Stricken: 12 March 1946
- Fate: Sold to merchant service, 23 December 1946, scrapped 1966/7

General characteristics
- Class & type: LST-1 class tank landing ship
- Displacement: 1,625 long tons (1,651 t) light; 4,080 long tons (4,145 t) full
- Length: 328 ft (100 m)
- Beam: 50 ft (15 m)
- Draft: Unloaded : 2 ft 4 in (0.71 m) bow; 7 ft 6 in (2.29 m) stern; Loaded : 8 ft 2 in (2.49 m) bow; 14 ft 1 in (4.29 m) stern
- Propulsion: 2 × General Motors 12-567 diesel engines, two shafts, twin rudders
- Speed: 12 knots (14 mph; 22 km/h)
- Boats & landing craft carried: Six LCVPs
- Troops: 14 officers, 131 enlisted men
- Complement: 9 officers, 120 enlisted men
- Armament: 2 × twin 40 mm gun mounts (Mark 51 director); 4 × single 40 mm gun mounts; 12 × single 20 mm gun mounts

Service record
- Operations: World War II; Operation Husky; Operation Avalanche; Operation Overlord
- Awards: 3 battle stars

USS LST-316 was one of 390 tank landing ships (LSTs) built for the United States Navy during World War II.

LST-316 was laid down on 15 October 1942 at the New York Navy Yard in Brooklyn, New York; launched on 28 January 1943; sponsored by Mrs. Pearl Magdalene Frick; and commissioned on 3 February 1943.

== Service history ==
During World War II, LST-316 was assigned to the European theater and participated in the Sicilian occupation (July 1943), Salerno landings (September 1943), and Invasion of Normandy (June 1944).

Upon her return to the United States, she was decommissioned on 24 May 1945 for conversion to landing craft repair ship USS Cerberus (ARL-43) at New York Navy Yard. The conversion was canceled 12 September 1945 and the ship reverted to LST-316; she was struck from the Naval Vessel Register on 12 March 1946. On 23 December 1946 she was sold to James Hughes, Inc. of New York, New York for conversion to merchant service.

LST-316 earned three battle stars for World War II service.

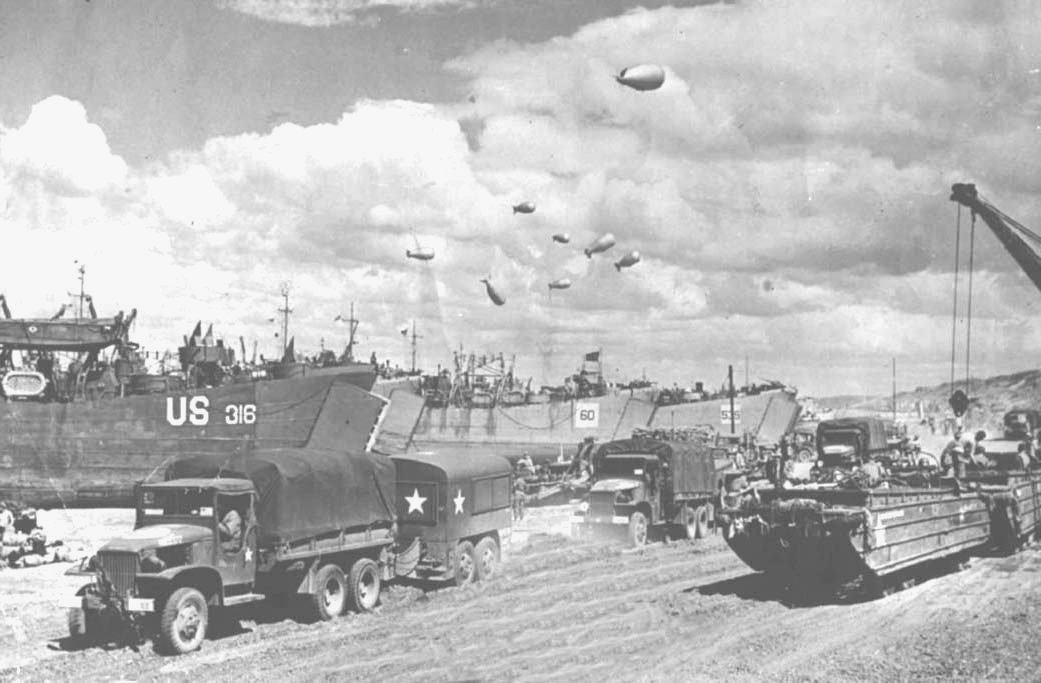
LST-316, LST-60, and LST-535 beached at Normandy, June 1944.

== See also ==
- List of United States Navy LSTs
