= Warren G. Harding Presidential Center =

Presidential library in Marion, Ohio

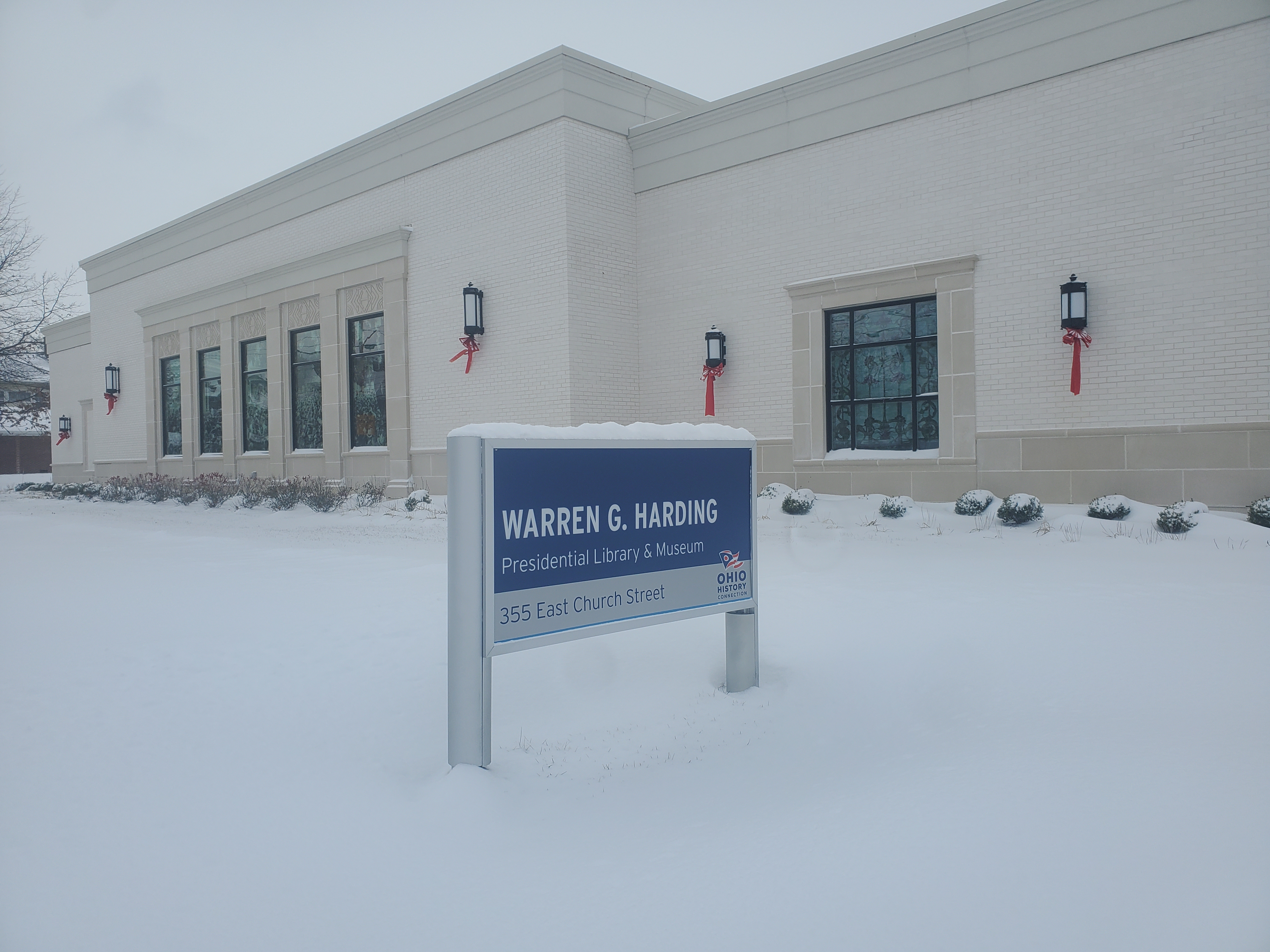
- The Warren G. Harding Presidential Center in 2022
- Interactive map of the Warren G. Harding Presidential Center area

General information
- Location: Marion, Ohio
- Coordinates: 40°35′14.1″N 83°7′19″W
- Named for: President Warren G. Harding
- Groundbreaking: March 2019
- Opened: May 12, 2021

Website
- hardingpresidentialsites.org/harding-presidential-library/

The Warren G. Harding Presidential Library and Museum is the presidential library of Warren G. Harding, the 29th president of the United States (1921–1923). It was scheduled to open on September 4, 2020, followed by a formal dedication ceremony later on September 18, 2020. However, the opening was postponed due to the COVID-19 pandemic. The library was officially opened to the public May 12, 2021.

It is located in Marion, Ohio, adjacent to the Harding Home, the historic house museum of the former president. The 2020 scheduled completion date was set to coincide with the 100th anniversary of Warren G. Harding's win in the 1920 presidential election.

The $7.5 million project was announced on April 12, 2016, by Harding 2020, a collaboration between the Harding Home, Marion Technical College, and the Ohio History Connection. Both of Ohio's then U.S. Senators, Sherrod Brown and Rob Portman, are honorary co-chairs of the project.

Plans included the construction of the 15,000-square-foot center and museum. The center has interactive exhibits of the former president, as well as meeting space. The center houses artifacts and memorabilia that were once owned by the former president and his wife Florence Harding. In addition, the center houses Harding's presidential papers, which were previously stored at the Ohio History Connection's headquarters in Columbus, Ohio, since 1963.

About $1.3 million will also be spent to restore the Harding Home and its grounds to reflect how they appeared in 1920.

Sherry Hall, manager of the Harding Home, told The Plain Dealer that the center will help inform visitors about Harding's presidency beyond the single paragraph found in most textbooks. "Quite frankly, this president deserves for his story to be told," stated Hall.
