= Ohio State University at Marion =

Remote campus of Ohio State University

- Type: Public satellite campus
- Established: 1957; 69 years ago
- Parent institution: Ohio State University
- President: Walter E. Carter Jr.
- Dean: Jennifer Schlueter
- Faculty: 205
- Students: 1,038 (fall 2023)
- Undergraduates: 1,015
- Postgraduates: 23
- Location: Marion, Ohio, United States
- Campus: Suburban 187 acres
- Colors: Scarlet and Gray
- Nickname: Scarlet Wave
- Sporting affiliations: ORCC
- Website: osumarion.osu.edu

Ohio State University at Marion (OSU Marion or OSUM) is a satellite campus of Ohio State University in Marion, Ohio. The campus was founded in 1957. Its 187-acre (0.76 km^{2}) campus is located 45 miles (72 km) north of Columbus and is shared with Marion Technical College. There are eight buildings on the campus.

The Marion campus practices open admissions. Its average class size is 19. An average age of students is 23.5. The Marion Campus Library of the OSU Marion Campus contains over 43,000 books. The library collection also includes microforms, maps, pamphlet file, special collections in careers and children's literature, and the Warren G. Harding/Norman Thomas Research Collection. It provides access to all the resources of Ohio State University and Ohio Link.

About 88% of students at the Marion campus are awarded federal or state financial aid. The student body is 53% female and 47% male. The Academy Program at the campus provides the opportunity for qualified students to enroll in college while still in high school as part of Ohio's College Credit Plus program. The Alber Enterprise Center is a campus-based corporate education center that provides workforce training, organization development, and performance improvement techniques.

== Academics ==
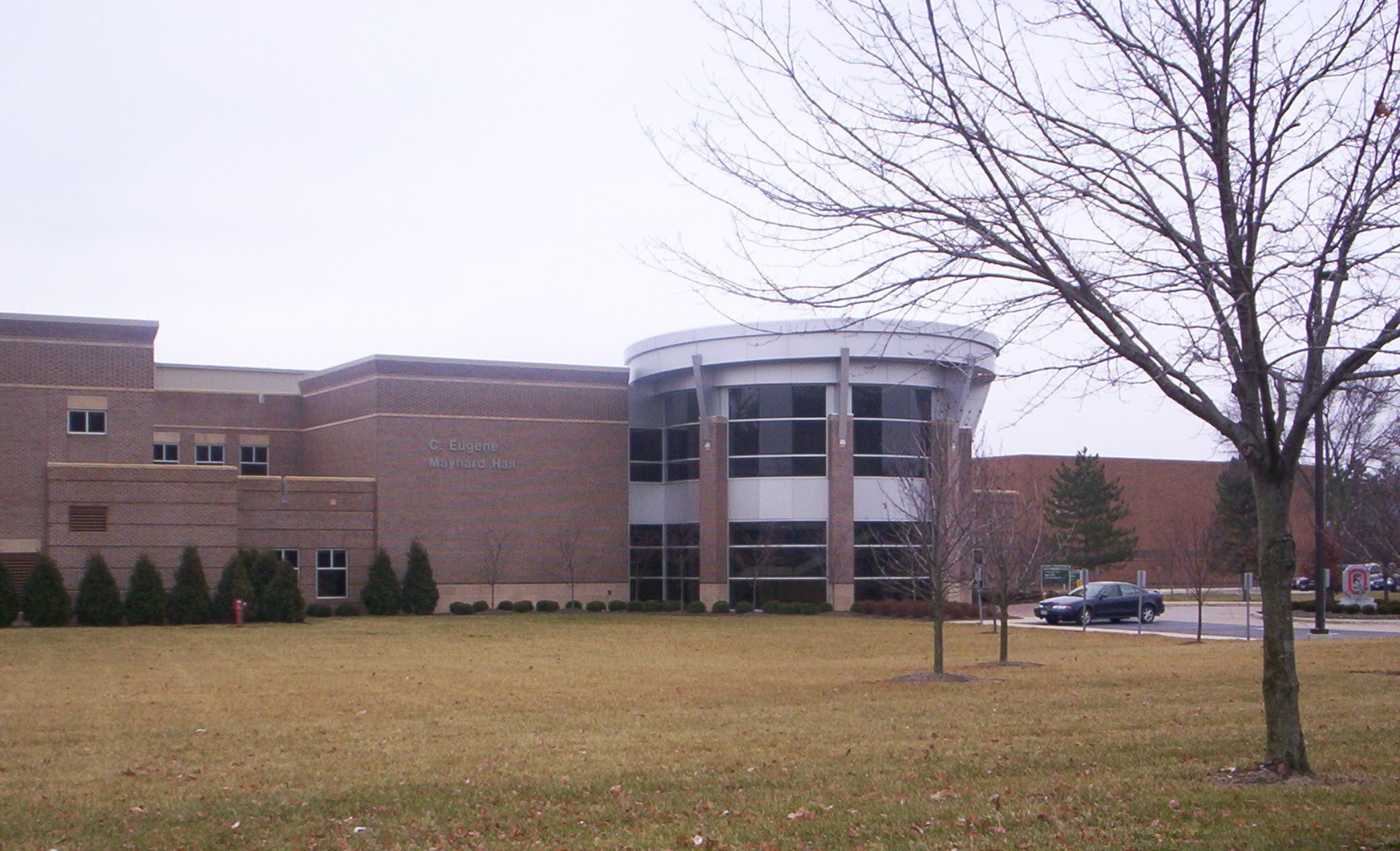
Maynard Hall

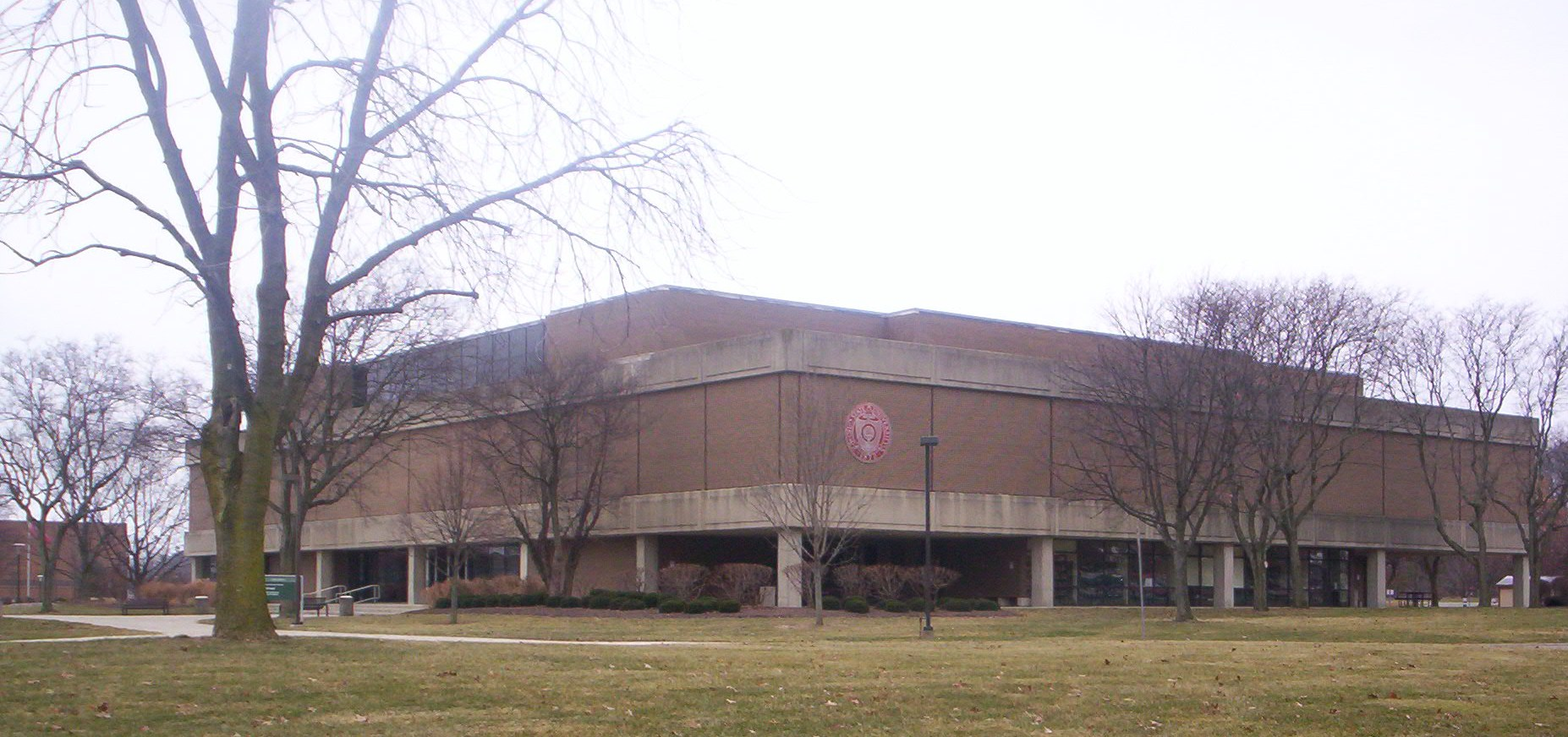
Morrill Hall

Students may complete one to three years of study in any of Ohio State University’s 200+ majors (available coursework varies by major) in Marion before making the transition to the Columbus campus to complete their degree. Several bachelor's programs and an Associate of Arts can be completed entirely at the Marion campus.

== Athletics ==
On December 2, 2006, Lincoln University defeated Ohio State Marion in basketball with a final score of 201-78. This set new all-time NCAA Division III basketball records for points scored in one game (201), points in a half (104), largest margin of victory (123), shots made (78), and shots taken (141). The scoreboard at the end of the game actually read "Lincoln 01, Marion 78," because it wasn't designed to go up to 200.

The Marion campus does not currently offer varsity athletic teams. A club level soccer team is active on the campus.

== Student life ==
=== Student organizations ===
There are over 30 student clubs on campus.

=== Campus Recreation ===
The Alber Student Center features a student lounge area w/big screen TV's; gymnasium (including basketball, badminton, pickleball); men's & women's locker rooms; indoor rock climbing wall (used for courses); weight/fitness room; student ID WiFi; pool tables, ping pong table; video game systems & games; corn hole; outdoor volleyball; fitness & recreational equipment; career closet; and much more.
