= Theodore Roosevelt Digital Library =

American online repository

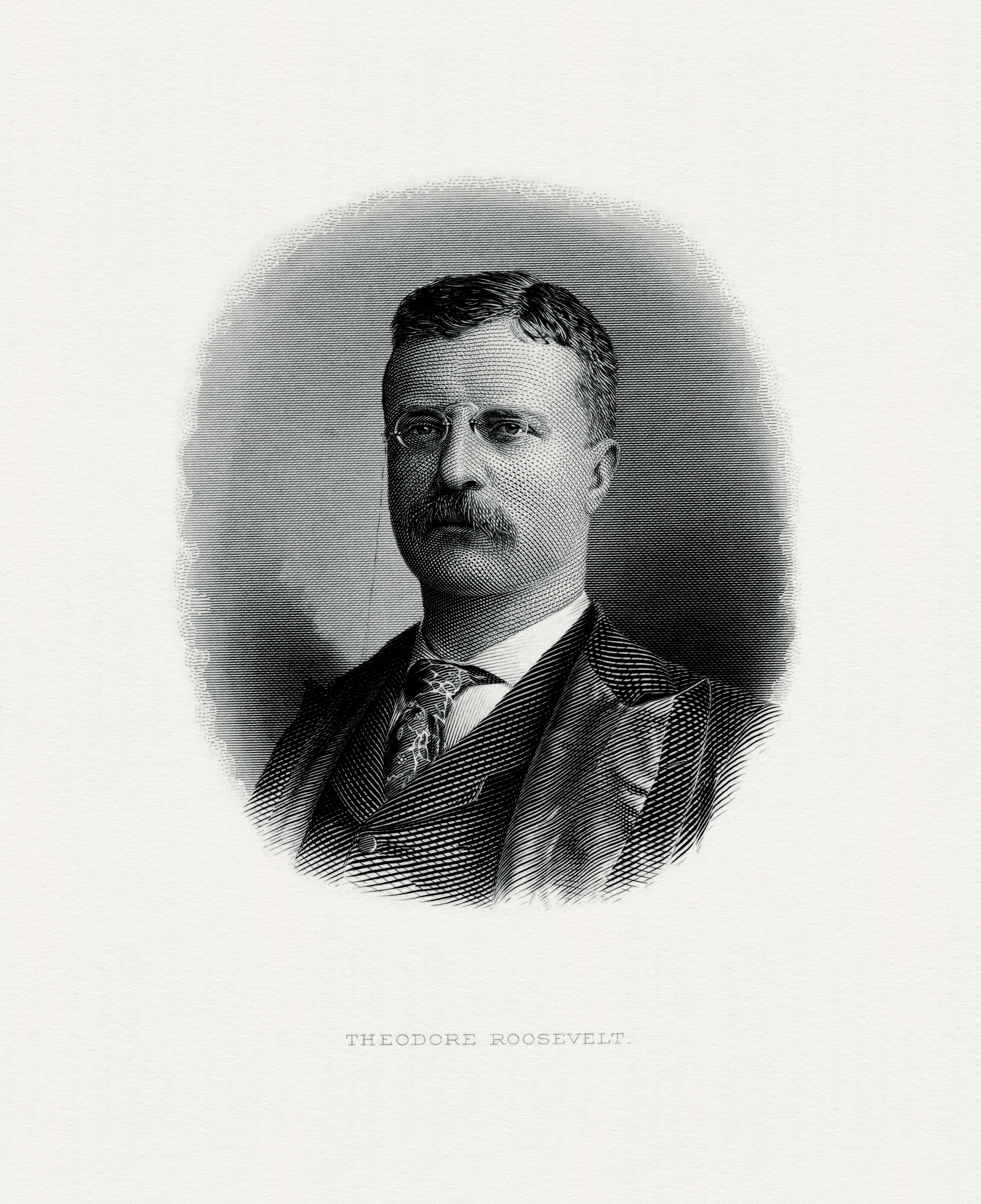
Theodore Roosevelt

The Theodore Roosevelt Digital Library is an online repository of information on Theodore Roosevelt.

After his death in 1919, Roosevelt's family and admirers have led multiple attempts to establish a Theodore Roosevelt Presidential Library and Museum. The first attempt became a national historic site in New York City and the papers themselves were donated to Harvard University. A later attempt in the 1990s focused on establishing a museum near where Roosevelt had his home in Sagamore Hill, NY.

On April 30, 2013, the North Dakota Legislative Assembly passed a bill appropriating $12 million to Dickinson State University to award a grant to the Theodore Roosevelt Center for construction of the Theodore Roosevelt Presidential Library. To access these funds, the Theodore Roosevelt Center had to first raise $3 million from non-state sources. A dedication ceremony was held by President Donald Trump on July 1, 2026, and the museum in Medora, North Dakota, opened to the public on the 250th anniversary of the nation on July 4.

The center is also home to the Theodore Roosevelt Digital Library which has formed partnerships with the Library of Congress and Harvard University, among other institutions. They currently have over 64,000 items online.

The Theodore Roosevelt Center digital library includes documents owned by Roosevelt, such as correspondence both to and from him, photographs, speeches, and his diaries and notes, as well as items about him such as newspaper and magazine articles and political cartoons. Audio recordings and films are also available for visitor use.

Among others, the participants in the digitization project include Dickinson State University, Harvard University, The Library of Congress, Mount Rushmore National Memorial, the Sagamore Hill National Historic Site, the Theodore Roosevelt Medora Foundation, the Gregory A. Wynn Theodore Roosevelt Collection, and the Theodore Roosevelt Birthplace, Inaugural Site, National Memorial, and National Park.
