= Nyaknno Osso =

Librarian and journalist

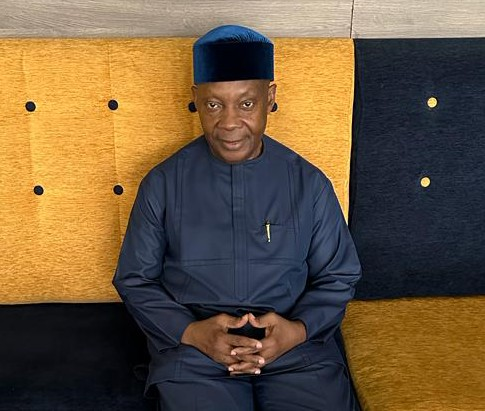
- Born: Nyaknnoabasi; 27 August 1954 (age 71)
- Education: Library Science
- Alma mater: University of Ibadan
- Occupations: Librarian, journalism
- Organization: BLERF - blerf.org
- Known for: Biographical Legacy & Research Foundation (BLERF)
- Notable work: "Who's Who in Nigeria", Olusegun Obasanjo Presidential Library

Nyaknno Osso is a Nigerian librarian, journalist, and founder of the Biographical Legacy and Research Foundation (BLERF).

== Early life and education ==
Osso graduated from the University of Ibadan (Library School) in 1975.

== Career ==
Osso's professional career encompasses library work at the University of Ibadan from 1971 to 1975 and a tenure in public service as the principal librarian and researcher at Cross River State Newspapers Corporation from 1975 to 1984. Transitioning to Newswatch Magazine in 1984, he assumed the role of the inaugural senior management staff member along with Dele Giwa and Ray Ekpu, eventually ascending to the position of Chief of Research. Upon concluding his tenure in 1991, he assumed the role of consultant librarian within Newswatch, where he later became editor of the celebrated Newswatch's "Who's Who in Nigeria."

Between 1999 and 2007, Osso served as the Special Assistant to former President Olusegun Obasanjo on Library, Research, and Documentation. In 2007, at the end of the administration of his principal, he assumed the role of Executive Secretary and Project Coordinator of the Olusegun Obasanjo Presidential Library Foundation (OOPLF). His tenure at OOPLF concluded in March 2013.

Osso's achievements in his mass media research and documentation career in Nigeria are as follows: the establishment of the Newspaper Library at Cross River Media Corporation, Calabar, spanning from 1975 to 1984. The Newsmedia Research Library at Newswatch Magazine, located in Ikeja, Lagos, operated from 1984 to 1998, with the publication of the Biographical Encyclopedia for Nigeria (Newswatch), entitled "Who’s Who in Nigeria?" in 1990, and the conceived and collaborative initiative with the former President of Nigeria, Chief Olusegun Obasanjo, to introduce the first presidential library in Africa, the Olusegun Obasanjo Presidential Library. The successful publication of the writings of Dele Giwa, the first Nigerian journalist to succumb to assassination via a letter bomb, under the title "Parallax Snaps: The Writings of Dele Giwa (1998)."
