= Inauguration of Zachary Taylor =

16th United States presidential inauguration

Presidential inauguration of Zachary Taylor
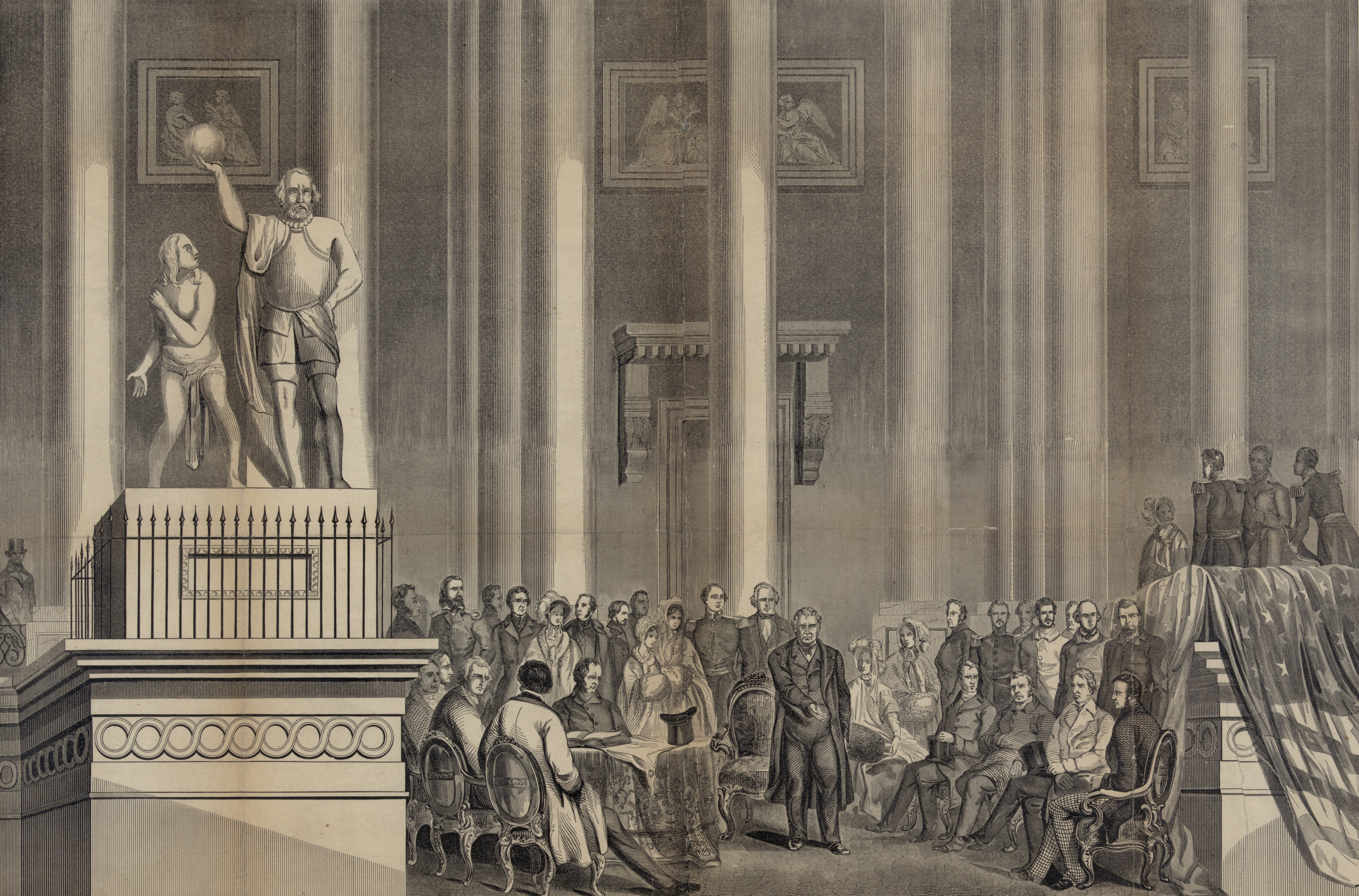
- Engraving of the inauguration of Zachary Taylor by Wm. Croome
- Date: March 5, 1849; 177 years ago
- Location: United States Capitol, Washington, D.C.
- Participants: Zachary Taylor; 12th president of the United States — Assuming office Roger B. Taney; Chief Justice of the United States — Administering oath Millard Fillmore; 12th vice president of the United States — Assuming office David Rice Atchison; President pro tempore of the United States Senate — Administering oath

The inauguration of Zachary Taylor as the 12th president of the United States was held on Monday, March 5, 1849, at the East Portico of the United States Capitol in Washington, D.C., and was the second instance of an inauguration being rescheduled due to March 4 falling on a Sunday, the Christian sabbath. This was the 16th regular inauguration and marked the commencement of the only four-year term of both Zachary Taylor as president and Millard Fillmore as vice president. He said, "The confidence and respect shown by my countrymen in calling me to be the Chief Magistrate of a Republic holding a high rank among the nations of the earth have inspired me with feelings of the most profound gratitude; but when I reflect that the acceptance of the office which their partiality has bestowed imposes the discharge of the most arduous duties and involves the weightiest obligations, I am conscious that the position which I have been called to fill, though sufficient to satisfy the loftiest ambition, is surrounded by fearful responsibilities." Taylor died 1 year, 126 days into this term, and Fillmore succeeded to the presidency. The presidential oath of office was administered by Chief Justice Roger B. Taney. Inauguration Day started off being cloudy with snow flurries, but turned to heavy snow during the inaugural balls.

== Inaugural festivities ==
Three inaugural balls were held later that day. To accommodate the large numbers of guests anticipated to be at one of them, a temporary wooden building was built in the Judiciary Square plaza. The ticket price for the event was $10 cash; the menu included: terrapins, Charlotte Russe, oysters and Roman punch.

== The "presidency" of David Rice Atchison ==
Taylor's term as president began on Sunday, March 4, but his inauguration was not held until the next day out of religious concerns. Due to the postponement of the swearing-in ceremony until March 5, various friends and colleagues of Senator David Atchison asserted that on March 4–5, 1849, he was acting president of the United States. They argued that, since both President James K. Polk and Vice President George Dallas ceased to hold their offices at noon on March 4, and since neither Taylor nor Fillmore had yet sworn their prescribed oath of office, both offices were vacant. As a result, they claimed, in accordance with the Presidential Succession Act of 1792, Atchison, by virtue of being the president pro tempore of the United States Senate, was the nation's acting chief executive during the interregnum. Historians, constitutional scholars and biographers dismiss the claim.

== See also ==
- Presidency of Zachary Taylor
- 1848 United States presidential election
