= Harding Home =

Historic house in Ohio, United States

- Warren G. Harding House
- U.S. National Register of Historic Places
- U.S. National Historic Landmark
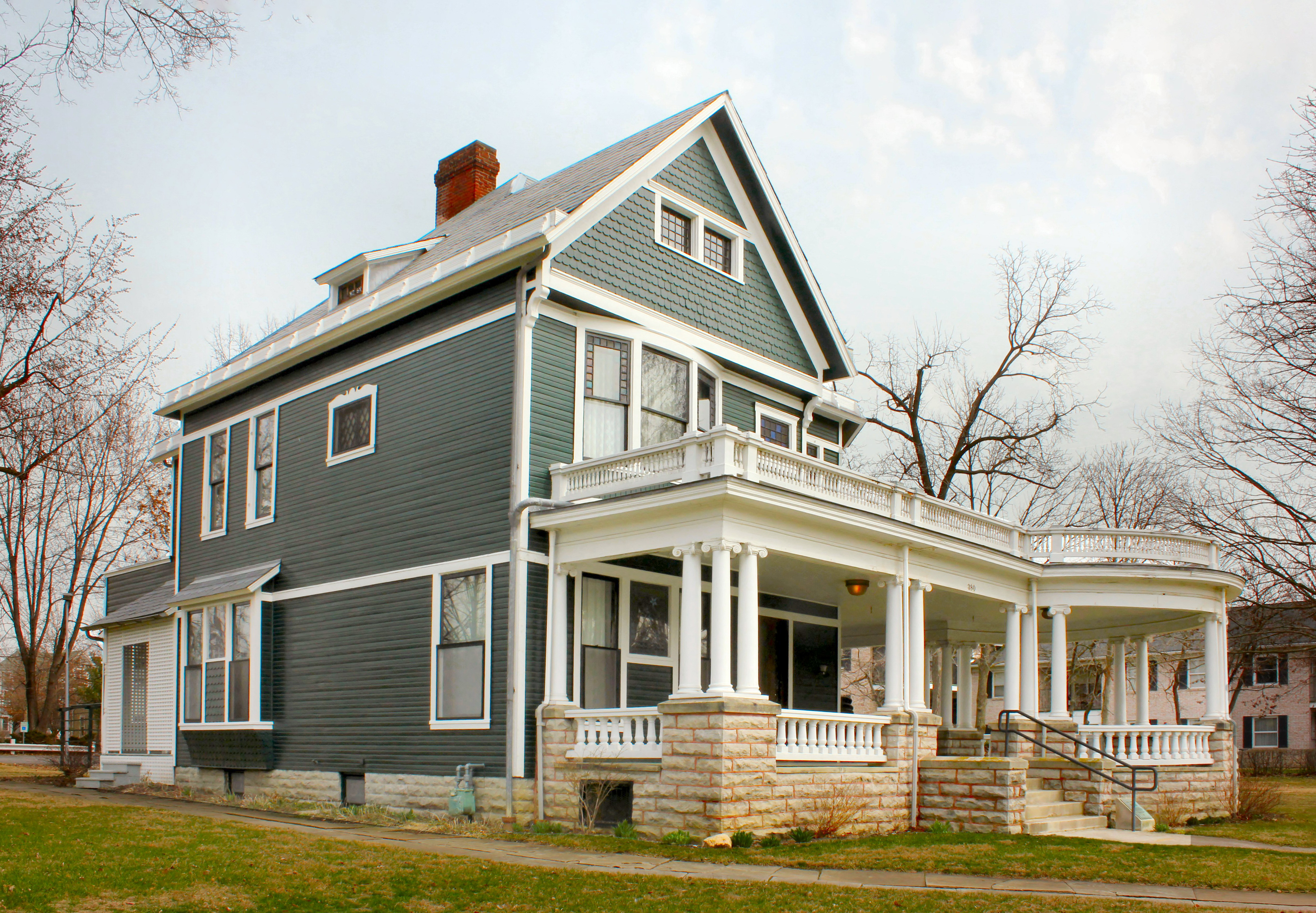
- Harding Home in 2011
- Interactive map of Warren G. Harding House
- Location: 380 Mt. Vernon Ave., Marion, Ohio
- Coordinates: 40°35′11.37″N 83°7′18.55″W
- Area: less than one acre
- Built: 1891
- Architectural style: Queen Anne Style
- NRHP reference No.: 66000618

Significant dates
- Added to NRHP: October 15, 1966
- Designated NHL: June 23, 1965

The Harding Home is a historic house museum at 380 Mount Vernon Avenue in Marion, Ohio. It was the residence of Warren G. Harding, 29th president of the United States. Harding and his future wife, Florence, designed the Queen Anne Style house in 1890, a year before their marriage. They were married there and lived there for 30 years before his election to the presidency.

Like James A. Garfield, an earlier U.S. president from Ohio, Harding conducted his election campaign mainly from the house's expansive front porch. During the 3 month front porch campaign, over 600,000 people traveled to the Harding Home to listen to Warren speak. George Christian (Warren's next door neighbor and Press Secretary) allowed his home to be used as Republican Headquarters for the campaign. In 1920, Harding built a small bungalow-style structure behind the Christian House so newspaper reporters had workspace to type their stories. The house is surrounded by an expansive, elaborately detailed porch. Entry to the house is through a reception hall, with a parlor on the left. A dining room and Harding's office are also in the first floor. There are four bedrooms on the second floor and a bathroom. Built-in closets are an unusual feature for the time.

Mrs. Harding bequeathed the house to the Harding Memorial Association. The Ohio History Connection now operates the home as a historic house museum and a memorial. The restored house contains almost all original furnishings owned by President Harding and his wife. The adjacent press house features exhibits about the lives of President and Mrs. Harding. The collection at the Harding Home is over 5,000 original artifacts that belonged to Warren and Florence Harding.

On April 12, 2016, "Harding 2020", a collaboration between Ohio History Connection, the Harding Home, and Marion Technical College, detailed plans to spend $7.3 million at the site to establish the Warren G. Harding Presidential Center. Plans include restoring the home (inside and out) and its grounds to its 1920 appearance. The culmination of the work was to coincide with the 100th anniversary of Harding's election to the presidency.

== See also ==
- List of National Historic Landmarks in Ohio
- List of residences of presidents of the United States
- Presidential memorials in the United States
