= Federico Sada González =

Mexican businessman

Federico Sada González (born 19 July 1949 in Monterrey, Nuevo León México - death 10 November 2022 in Monterrey, Nuevo León México) was a Mexican businessman and the former president of the Mexico-France Bilateral Business Committee of the Mexican Business Council for Foreign Trade, Investment, and Technology (COMCE). He was the former CEO of Vitro, S.A. de C.V., one of the world's leading glass producers. Federico was also theChairman of the Fundación Pro Museo Nacional de Historia and was also a member of the Fox Center Civil Association, affiliated with former President of Mexico Vicente Fox.
