= Seeley G. Mudd Manuscript Library =

Archive at Princeton

Coordinates: 40.3496°N 74.6520°W

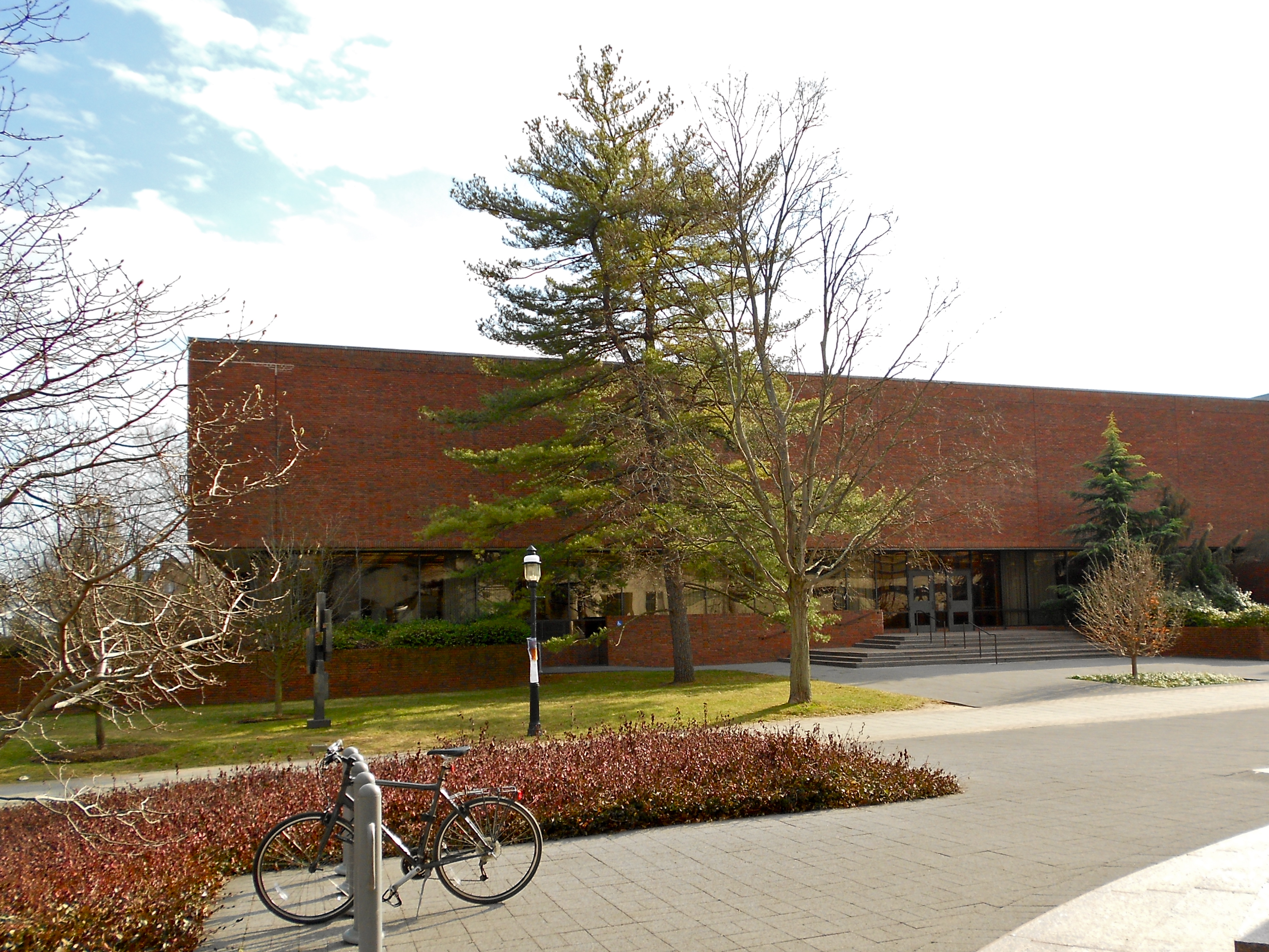
- A view of the library from the north
- Location: Princeton, New Jersey, United States
- Type: Archive & special collections
- Scope: Princeton University history Public policy
- Established: 1976
- Architect: Hugh Stubbins
- Branch of: Princeton University Library

Collection
- Size: 45,000 linear feet

Other information
- Website: https://library.princeton.edu/special-collections/mudd

The Seeley G. Mudd Manuscript Library is the institutional archives of Princeton University and is part of the Princeton University Library's department of special collections. The Mudd Library houses two major collection areas: the history of Princeton and the history of twentieth century public policy.

The Mudd Library was designed by Hugh Stubbins and cost $2.5 million at the time of its construction. It was the first building to be designed under the University's energy conservation program and was dedicated on October 16, 1976. Its creation was supported by the Seeley G. Mudd Foundation. The Library currently holds 42,000 linear feet of archived material. The building underwent a significant infrastructure renovation in 2020–21, in which the original HVAC, fire suppression, electrical, security, and plumbing systems were modernized, and a number of alterations to the first floor plan led to the creation of an additional seminar room.

== Notable collections housed at the Mudd Library ==
=== University archives collections ===
The university archives collections the records of students and faculty at Princeton University, evidence of the university's business, records of student life, and university publications. The university archives is also the repository for Princeton senior theses and doctoral dissertations. The archives were used extensively in the Princeton and Slavery project.

=== Public policy collections ===
The five major collecting areas for public policy at Mudd Library are foreign policy, jurisprudence, journalism, public policy formation, and international development. The library has collected from individuals and organizations that influenced these areas in the twentieth and twenty-first centuries.

- American Civil Liberties Union
- Americans United for Separation of Church and State
- Association on American Indian Affairs
- Bernard Baruch
- James A. Baker III
- Grover Cleveland
- Council on Foreign Relations
- Allen Welsh Dulles
- John Foster Dulles
- Freedom House
- John Marshall Harlan II
- Richard Holbrooke
- George F. Kennan
- Arthur Krock
- George McGovern
- H. Alexander Smith
- Adlai Stevenson
- Paul Volcker
- Woodrow Wilson
- Charles W. Yost
