= Lansdowne, Lexington =

Lansdowne
- Neighborhood of Lexington, Kentucky
- Interactive map of Lansdowne
- Coordinates: 37.996°N 84.504°W
- Country: United States
- State: Kentucky
- County: Fayette
- City: Lexington

Area
  - Total: 1.233 sq mi (3.19 km^{2})
  - Water: 0 sq mi (0.0 km^{2})

Population (2000)
  - Total: 2,406
  - Density: 1,952/sq mi (754/km^{2})
- Time zone: UTC-5 (Eastern (EST))
  - Summer (DST): UTC-4 (EDT)
- ZIP code: 40502
- Area code: 859
- Website: lnalex.com

Lansdowne is a neighborhood in southeast Lexington, Kentucky, United States. Its boundaries are Tates Creek Road to the east, New Circle Road to the south, and its western border is a combination of Belvoir Dr / Malabu Dr, Larkin Rd, Heather Way, and Melbourne Way.

== Neighborhood statistics ==
- Area: 1.233 square miles (3.19 km^{2})
- Population: 2,406
- Population density: 1,952 people per square mile
- Median household income (2010): $56,026
