= USS LST-30 =

1943 LST-1-class tank landing ship

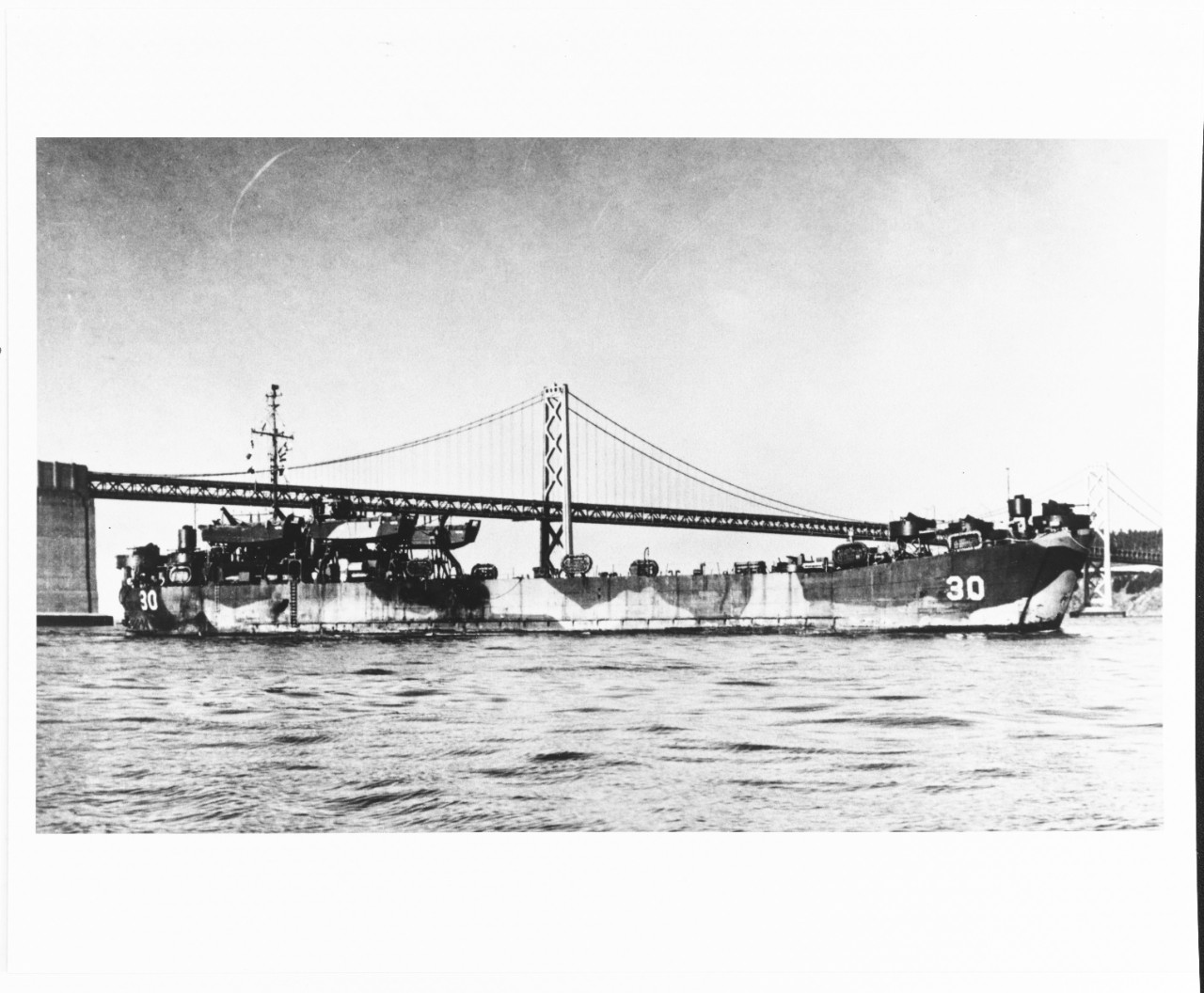
- USS LST-30 in San Francisco Bay, c. 1945-1946.

History

United States
- Name: LST-30
- Builder: Dravo Corporation, Pittsburgh, Pennsylvania
- Laid down: 12 January 1943
- Launched: 3 May 1943
- Sponsored by: Mrs. C. B. Jansen
- Commissioned: 3 July 1943
- Decommissioned: 6 March 1946
- Stricken: 8 May 1946
- Identification: Hull symbol: LST-30; Code letters: NVCG
- Honors and awards: 1 × battle star
- Fate: Sold for merchant service, 2 April 1946

General characteristics
- Type: LST-1-class tank landing ship
- Displacement: 4,080 long tons (4,145 t) full load; 2,160 long tons (2,190 t) landing
- Length: 328 ft (100 m) oa
- Beam: 50 ft (15 m)
- Draft: Full load: 8 ft 2 in (2.49 m) forward; 14 ft 1 in (4.29 m) aft; Landing at 2,160 t: 3 ft 11 in (1.19 m) forward; 9 ft 10 in (3.00 m) aft
- Installed power: 2 × 900 hp (670 kW) Electro-Motive Diesel 12-567A diesel engines; 1,700 shp (1,300 kW)
- Propulsion: 1 × Falk main reduction gears; 2 × Propellers
- Speed: 12 kn (22 km/h; 14 mph)
- Range: 24,000 nmi (44,000 km; 28,000 mi) at 9 kn (17 km/h; 10 mph) while displacing 3,960 long tons (4,024 t)
- Boats & landing craft carried: 2 or 6 x LCVPs
- Capacity: 2,100 tons oceangoing maximum; 350 tons main deckload
- Troops: 16 officers, 147 enlisted men
- Complement: 13 officers, 104 enlisted men
- Armament: Varied, ultimate armament; 2 × twin 40 mm (1.57 in) Bofors guns; 4 × single 40 mm Bofors guns; 12 × 20 mm (0.79 in) Oerlikon cannons

Service record
- Operations: Invasion of Normandy (6–25 June 1944)
- Awards: American Campaign Medal; European–African–Middle Eastern Campaign Medal; World War II Victory Medal

USS LST-30 was a United States Navy LST-1-class tank landing ship used exclusively in the Europe-Africa-Middle East Theater during World War II. Like many of her class, she was not named and is properly referred to by her hull designation.

== Construction ==
LST-30 was laid down on 12 January 1943, at Pittsburgh, Pennsylvania, by the Dravo Corporation; launched on 3 May 1943; sponsored by Mrs. C. B. Jansen; and commissioned on 10 July 1943.

== Service history ==
Records indicate LST-30 traveled from Halifax, Nova Scotia, in Convoy SC 144 on 11 October 1943, arriving in Liverpool, England, on 27 October 1943.

She participated in the Normandy invasion, June 1944.

She departed Liverpool, on 11 May 1945, with Convoy ONS 50 arriving in Halifax, on 29 May 1945.

== Postwar career ==
LST-30 was decommissioned on 6 March 1946, and was struck from the Navy list on 8 May 1946. On 2 April 1946, she was sold to the W. Horace Williams Company, of New Orleans, Louisiana.

== Awards ==
LST-30 earned one battle star for her World War II service.

== Bibliography ==
- "LST-30". Dictionary of American Naval Fighting Ships. Naval History and Heritage Command. 1 June 2015. This article incorporates text from this source, which is in the public domain.
- "USS LST-30". NavSource. 4 July 2014.
- "Convoy SC.144". Arnold Hague Convoy Database.
- "Convoy ONS.50". Arnold Hague Convoy Database.
