= Vicente Fox Center of Studies, Library and Museum =

Presidential history center in Guanajuato

- 20.978336019892478°N 101.69564165187263°W
- Location: San Cristobal, Guanajuato, Mexico

Other information
- Website: https://www.centrofox.org.mx/

The Vicente Fox Center of Studies, Library and Museum (Spanish: Centro Fox) is a presidential history center founded by former President of Mexico (2000–2006) Vicente Fox in San Cristóbal near his ranch in the state of Guanajuato. The Center is funded by the Fox Center Civil Association.

Some of the members of the civil association are:

- Vicente Fox
- Marta Sahagún
- Carlos Slim Helú
- Emilio Azcárraga Jean
- Ricardo Salinas Pliego
- Olegario Vázquez Raña
- Roberto Hernández
- Federico Sada González
- Lorenzo Zambrano
- Arturo Elías Ayub

The Center closed in July 2026 and its facilities were transferred to the University of the Incarnate Word, a U.S.-based private institute of education, under a 100-year lease.

== See also ==
- List of libraries in Mexico
