= Olusegun Obasanjo Presidential Library =

Private library in Nigeria

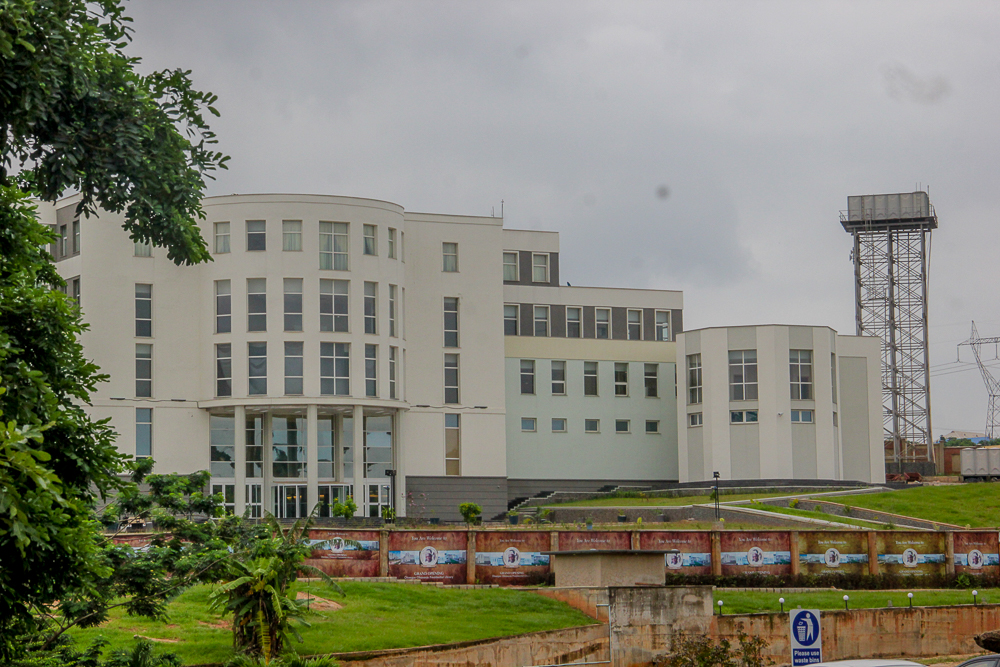
- Front of the library
- 7.126024306081321°N 3.364701179964038°E
- Location: Presidential Boulevard Way, Oke Mosan, Abeokuta, Ogun State, Nigeria
- Type: Presidential library
- Established: 2017

Collection
- Items collected: Books, journals, newspapers, magazines, sound and music recordings, patents, databases, maps, stamps, prints, drawings and manuscripts

Access and use
- Access requirements: Open to students, researchers, and the general public

Other information
- Director: Ayo Aderinwale (Deputy Chief Coordinator)
- Website: oopl.org.ng

The Olusegun Obasanjo Presidential Library is a library owned by Chief Olusegun Obasanjo, a former President of Nigeria. It is a historic, tourist and academic centre established as a national archive for the preservation of documents and materials used by the president during his tenure as the president of Nigeria. The library is located at Oke Mosan Abeokuta, Ogun State in Nigeria.

== History ==
The library resembles the presidential library system from the United States. The concept of the Presidential Library started in 1939 by President Franklin D. Roosevelt who donated his official documents for national use.

The Olusegun Obasanjo Presidential Library was conceived by Nyaknno Osso in 1988 to immortalize him, and was actualized after he became the president of the Federal Republic of Nigeria. The idea to establish the Olusegun Obasanjo Presidential Library remained just an idea until 10 years later when Chief Olusegun Obasanjo rose from prison to the State House as Nigeria's second-elected Executive President. He soon established the Office of Presidential Libraries (Libraries, Research and Documentation) with a stated mission to see the OOPL idea translated into reality.

On November 12, 2002, the Olusegun Obasanjo Presidential Library Foundation was incorporated as a non-profit organisation to advise, promote and encourage the establishment, growth, and development of the Library, coordinate its activities and provide support for its programmes. The Foundation's board of trustees was charged with mobilising private sector interest and funding to construct, furnish, maintain, and protect the Library complex's buildings and its holdings.

The Olusegun Obasanjo Presidential Library, came to limelight in 2008 at Ita-Eko in Abeokuta, Ogun State.

== Facilities ==
The Presidential Library complex comprises 32 hectares (380,000 yd^{2}). The archives house 15 million documents, two million books and 4,000 artifacts relating to Obasanjo's two stints in power, and contemporary Nigerian and African history more generally. The complex also includes an open air amphitheater, a 1,000-seat auditorium, a 153-room hotel, several restaurants and bars, a small amusement park, a wildlife park, and an observation point.

== Structure ==
The presidential library complex is located at the intersection of two major roads, The Presidential Boulevard and The MKO Abiola Way. The complex's 32 hectares (380,000 yd^{2}) lie near the Federal High Court, the City Stadium, and the Federal and State Governments’ Secretariats.

The construction of the complex presented many environmental and physical challenges due to the site's unique topographical formation. Almost 47 percent of the site is covered with outcrops of igneous granite rock formation. A plateau-like formation serves as a natural helipad. A swift stream was dammed to provide water and electricity. The dam is one of the highlights of any visit to the library complex.
