= USS LST-535 =

LST-491-class landing ship tank

History

United States
- Name: LST-535
- Builder: Missouri Valley Bridge and Iron Co., Evansville
- Laid down: 19 October 1943
- Launched: 21 December 1943
- Sponsored by: Mrs. John L. Mullins
- Commissioned: 4 February 1944
- Decommissioned: 14 January 1946
- Reclassified: Q014, 14 January 1946; T-LST-535, 31 March 1952
- Stricken: 1 October 1958
- Identification: Callsign: NEAR
- Honors and awards: See Awards
- Fate: Transferred to Republic of China, 1 October 1958

Taiwan
- Name: Chung Wan; (中萬)
- Acquired: 1 October 1958
- Commissioned: 16 September 1958
- Decommissioned: 1 February 1993
- Identification: Hull number: LST-229

General characteristics
- Class & type: LST-491-class tank landing ship
- Displacement: 1,625 long tons (1,651 t) (light); 4,080 long tons (4,145 t) (full (seagoing draft with 1,675 short tons (1,520 t) load); 2,366 long tons (2,404 t) (beaching)
- Length: 328 ft (100 m) oa
- Beam: 50 ft (15 m)
- Draft: Unloaded: 2 ft 4 in (0.71 m) forward; 7 ft 6 in (2.29 m) aft; Full load: 8 ft 3 in (2.51 m) forward; 14 ft 1 in (4.29 m) aft; Landing with 500 short tons (450 t) load: 3 ft 11 in (1.19 m) forward; 9 ft 10 in (3.00 m) aft
- Installed power: 2 × 900 hp (670 kW) Electro-Motive Diesel 12-567A diesel engines; 1,700 shp (1,300 kW)
- Propulsion: 1 × Falk main reduction gears; 2 × Propellers
- Speed: 12 kn (22 km/h; 14 mph)
- Range: 24,000 nmi (44,000 km; 28,000 mi) at 9 kn (17 km/h; 10 mph) while displacing 3,960 long tons (4,024 t)
- Boats & landing craft carried: 6 x LCVPs
- Capacity: 1,600–1,900 short tons (3,200,000–3,800,000 lb; 1,500,000–1,700,000 kg) cargo depending on mission
- Troops: 16 officers, 147 enlisted men
- Complement: 13 officers, 104 enlisted men
- Armament: Varied, ultimate armament; 2 × twin 40 mm (1.57 in) Bofors guns; 4 × single 40 mm Bofors guns; 12 × 20 mm (0.79 in) Oerlikon cannons

USS LST-535 was a LST-491-class tank landing ship in the United States Navy during World War II. She was transferred to the Republic of China Navy as ROCS Chung Wan (LST-229).

== Construction and career ==
LST-535 was laid down on 19 October 1943 at Missouri Valley Bridge and Iron Company, Evansville, Indiana. Launched on 21 December 1943 and commissioned on 4 February 1944.

=== Service in the United States Navy ===
During World War II, LST-535 was assigned to the Europe-Africa-Middle theater but later changed to Asiatic-Pacific theater. She then participated in the Invasion of Normandy from 6 to 25 June 1944.

She participated in the invasion of Okinawa and later took occupation there from 30 May to 10 June 1945. She assigned to Occupation service in the Far East from 10 to 28 September 1945 and 1 to 14 January 1946.

She was decommissioned on 14 January 1946 and came under the Commander Naval Forces Far East (COMNAVFE) Shipping Control Authority for Japan (SCAJAP), redesignated Q004.

Transferred to the Military Sea Transportation Service (MSTS), 31 March 1952, and placed in service as USNS T-LST-535.

LST-535 was struck from the Navy Register on 1 October 1958 and transferred to the Republic of China.

=== Service in the Republic of China Navy ===
She was commissioned into the Republic of China Navy on 16 September 1958 and renamed ROCS Chung Wan (LST-229) and was subordinate to the Deng Er Fleet Department (136 Fleet Department).

The Vietnam War in 1975 was about to end, and Vietnam's redification was a foregone conclusion. The Taiwan Navy carried out the Tongji exercise on March 28 of the same year and dispatched the Chung Jian (LST-205) and Chong Chie (LST-218), Chung Wan (LST-229) and Chung Bang (LST-230) went to Vietnam to evacuate overseas Chinese and refugees, and transport supplies.

On March 30, on the way to Vietnam, the detachment learned that Da Nang and Cam Ranh Bay had fallen, and the Chung Wan and Chung Bang ships turned into the Chao Phraya River and arrived in Saigon on April 3 to unload their supplies. To help the refugees, he sailed out of the Chao Phraya River to Phu Quoc Island to join Chung Jian and Chung Chie. On April 14, the Chung Wan ship landed and landed on the island first, and the three ships including Chung Jian also completed the beaching and landing on the island, carrying out the task of unloading materials and humanitarian rescue.

During the naval service period, the ship performed out-of-island transportation, supplementary training, and exercise training. It was able to display mutual assistance, cooperation, and the spirit of unity and struggle, and it was successfully completed.

Since the flight decks of the Chung Jian and Chung Wan have not been modified to take off and land the helicopter, they will return to Taiwan first after completing the loading of personnel and materials. Chung Chien and Chung Bang remained on standby in Phu Quoc Island, and then returned to Taiwan safely and smoothly.

Due to the gradual decrease in transportation and replenishment tasks, a simple seal was ordered on 16 December 1990.

== Awards ==
LST-535 have earned the following awards:

- American Campaign Medal
- European-Africa-Middle East Campaign Medal (1 battle star)
- Asiatic-Pacific Campaign Medal (1 battle star)
- Navy Occupation Medal (with Asia clasp)
- World War II Victory Medal

== Sources ==
- United States. Dept. of the Treasury (1962). Treasury Decisions Under the Customs, Internal Revenue, Industrial Alcohol, Narcotic and Other Laws, Volume 97. U.S. Government Printing Office.
- Moore, Capt. John (1984). Jane's Fighting Ships 1984-85. Jane's Information Group. ISBN 978-0710607959.
- Saunders, Stephen (2009). Jane's Fighting Ships 2009-2010. Jane's Information Group. ISBN 978-0710628886.
- Fairplay International Shipping Journal Volume 222. United Kingdom: Fairplay Publishing Limited. 1967.
