= Atchison County Historical Museum =

Local history museum in Atchison County, Kansas

Coordinates: 39°33′36″N 95°07′36″W

Atchison County Historical Society Museum is a museum dedicated to preserving the history of Atchison County, Kansas. Both the city of Atchison and Atchison County, Kansas, are named after United States Senator and legendary "President for a day" David Rice Atchison.

The Atchison County Historical Society & Museum is located in the historic 1880 Santa Fe Freight Depot (200 S. 10th Street) in Atchison, Kansas. Dedicated to telling the story of Atchison County, Kansas, the museum features exhibits on Lewis and Clark, Amelia Earhart, George W. Glick, Jesse Stone, the railroad history of Atchison County, the David Rice Atchison World's Smallest "unofficial" Presidential Library, and a military collection with over 200 weapons spanning the Revolutionary War, Civil War and both World Wars.

The Atchison County Historical Society also operates the Independence Creek: Lewis & Clark Historic Site (located at 19917 314th Road in Atchison County) covering 13.5 acres of native grasses and wildflowers and a re-creation of a Kanza Indian earth lodge, connected by a 5-mile hiking/biking trail to the Atchison riverfront.

The museum also hosts regular temporary and traveling exhibits. From 27 June to 9 August 2015, it hosted a Smithsonian traveling exhibit called "Hometown Teams."

== Background on the Atchison County Historical Society ==
Established in 1967, the historical society's first museum was opened in 1968. The society moved into the current museum, the 1880 Santa Fe Depot, in 1989. The museum hosts quarterly evening adult education programs and sponsors K-12 programming, including a monthly Pioneer Club for 4th-7th grade students.

The Atchison County Historical Society, Inc. is a 501(c)(3) non-profit corporation established in the State of Kansas.

== The World's Smallest Presidential Library ==
Atchison, a pro-slavery Democrat, was a senator from Missouri who was consumed by the Kansas issue – if the new state of Kansas would be a free-state or allow the extension of slavery. He is sometimes seen as a key player in the Kansas-Nebraska Act and therefore partially credited with the birth of the state of Kansas.

Some of Atchison's associates claimed that he technically held the office of President of the United States for 24 hours—from noon Sunday, March 4, 1849, to noon Monday. Outgoing President James Polk's term expired at noon on Sunday, and his vice-president George M. Dallas's term had also expired. The president-elect, Zachary Taylor, refused to be sworn into office on the sabbath (Sunday). Taylor's vice presidential running mate, Millard Fillmore, likewise was not inaugurated. As President Pro Tempore of the Senate from the prior U.S. Congress, under the presidential succession law in place at the time, Atchison was second in line of presidential succession. For those 24 hours Atchison was posited as the highest-ranking elected official in the U.S. (though his term of office had also expired at noon on Sunday). The Atchison County Historical Society Museum's exhibit leaves the determination up to the visitor if Atchison was president or not (though generally believed he was not).

== The Independence Creek: Lewis and Clark Historic Site ==
The site is open sunrise to sunset year round. Located 5 miles north of Atchison's Main Street, this site may be reached by car or by hiking/biking trail. The 13.5-acre site has re-established the prairie as seen by the Corps of Discovery and encompasses a stretch of Independence Creek described by Captain William Clark in his July 4, 1804 journal entry. A pedestrian bridge completes the 5-mile trail link to the Atchison Riverfront. A re-creation of a 1724–1804 era Kanza earth lodge interprets the location's connection to the Kanza people.
