= Marion Technical College =

College in Marion, Ohio, U.S.

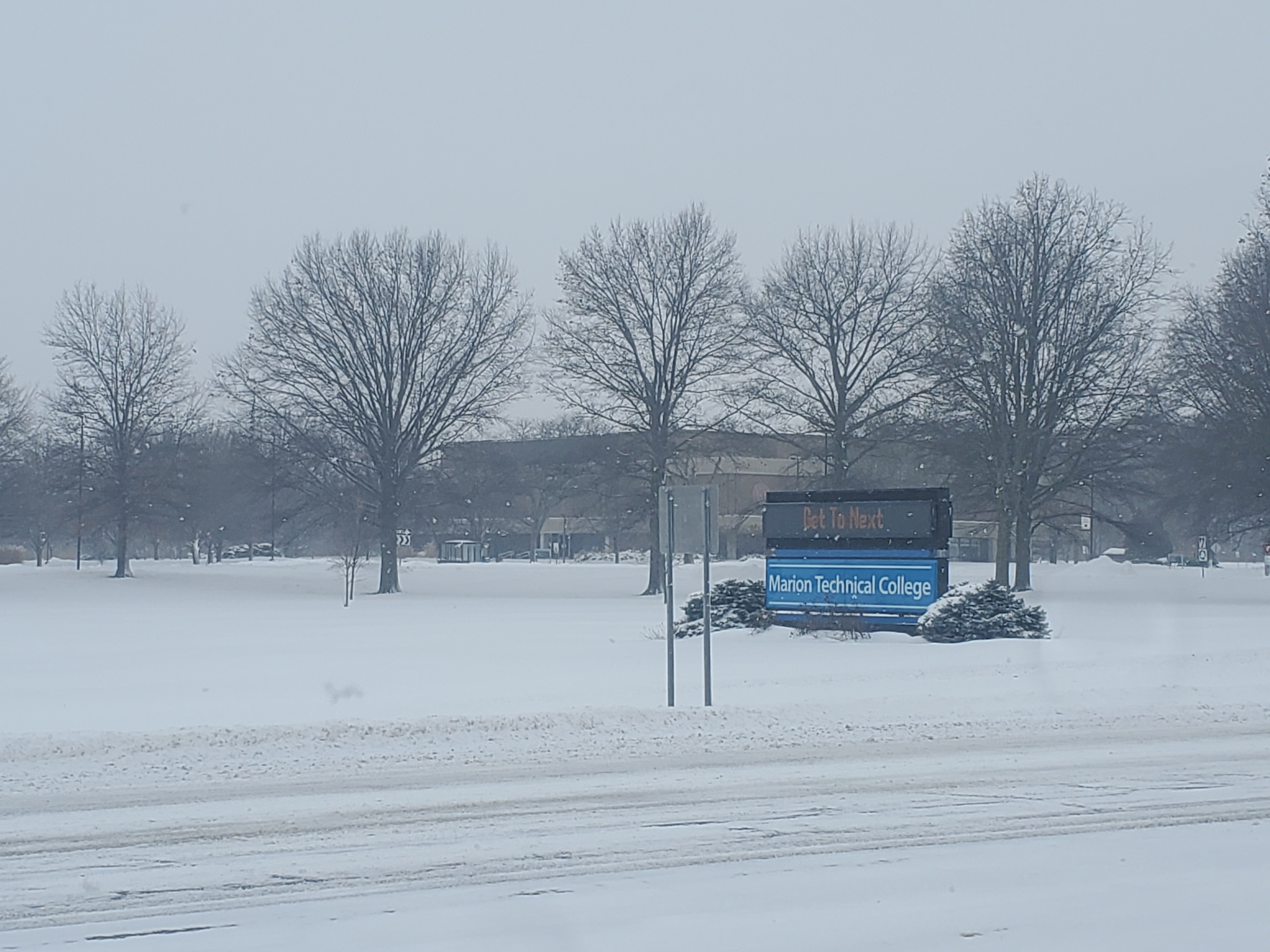
- Type: Public technical college
- Established: 1970; 56 years ago
- Parent institution: University System of Ohio
- President: Ryan McCall
- Students: 3,010 (fall 2023)
- Location: Marion, Ohio, United States; 40.5790°N 83.0894°W
- Campus: 180 acres (0.73 km^{2})
- Colors: Blue and White
- Nickname: MTC
- Website: www.mtc.edu
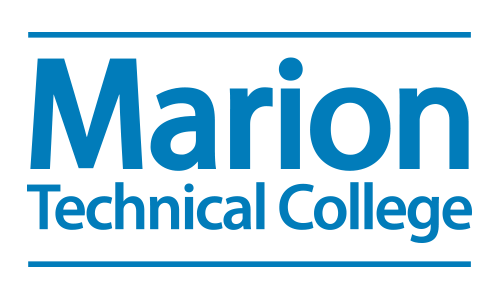

Marion Technical College, (Marion Tech or MTC) is a public technical college in Marion, Ohio, United States. It shares a campus with Ohio State University at Marion. Founded in 1970 with classes beginning in 1971, MTC has awarded over 7,500 associate degrees. The college offers associate degrees, certificates, and transfer programs in the areas of Business, Engineering, Information Technology, Public Service, Health, and Arts and Sciences. As of 2023, it offered one Bachelor of Science degree in nursing. The college practices open admissions. Some Marion Tech professors teach courses at local high schools for qualified students to earn college credits. High school students comprise 55% of MTC's enrollment, making them the student majority and the cause of increased enrollment at the college over the past decade.

== Academics ==
MTC is accredited by The Higher Learning Commission.

=== Transferable programs ===
In 2009 the college began offering an Associate of Arts degree and an Associate of Science degree. These "pre-bachelor's" degrees comprise liberal arts and sciences education that enable students to transfer to four-year public colleges in the state of Ohio with the first two years of a bachelor's degree complete. This transfer process is guaranteed by the Ohio Board of Regents via the Transfer Assurance Guide (TAG). In addition to TAG courses, MTC also has articulation agreements with select private colleges in the state of Ohio. For instance, the articulation agreement with Heidelberg University (Ohio) located in Tiffin, Ohio, states that students who have earned an associate of arts or associate of science degree from MTC and meet the admission requirements of Heidelberg University (Ohio) will be admitted with full junior status. The articulation agreement with Franklin University states that students who complete an associate degree at MTC can have their credits transferred to Franklin University whereupon they can begin working on and complete an online bachelor's degree from Franklin. Mount Vernon Nazarene University (MVNU) in Mount Vernon, Ohio and MTC have an articulation agreement which allows MTC associate degree graduates to transfer their credit to MVNU into their bachelor's degree program. In May 2011, Otterbein University in Westerville, OH signed an articulation agreement with MTC that states they will admit and confer full junior status upon any student who completes an associate degree with a 2.0 or higher at MTC.

=== Distance learning ===
As early as 2001, students in a nursing master's program were able to attend classes at Otterbein University electronically from the videoconferencing room at Marion Technical College.

== Awards and recognition ==
In 2009 MTC was awarded the William Over College Access Collaboration Award from the Ohio College Access Network (OCAN). The award is given annually "to a college access program, resource center or high school dedicated to building collaborative relationships to help more Ohioans access, pay for and enroll in educational programs beyond high school."

In 2011 MTC was awarded two Innovation Awards from the Center for Transforming Student Services (CENTSS). One award was given because of the college's Orientation Reference Guide created by Brian Liles, and the other award was given because of the college's official blog, The MTC Insider. According to CENTSS, Innovation Awards are given to "college and university student services professionals [who] have used tools, creative strategies, and fresh thinking to design, develop, implement, and maintain online student services that have produced measureable results."

The college gained some national press in the spring of 2018 when it announced a new policy that will award students free tuition for their second year if they complete at least 30 hours of "college-level" courses in their first year and earn at least a 2.5 grade point average. The college president credited the idea in part to a blog post in Inside Higher Ed.
