= Nuala Creed =

Irish sculptor

- Born: Dublin, Ireland
- Education: California College of the Arts
- Known for: Ceramic Art; Sculpture
- Website: nualacreed.com

Nuala Creed is an Irish ceramic sculptor living in Northern California, United States. She is known for a series of over 120 Ceramic Archivists, on display as a permanent collection at the Internet Archive in San Francisco. She is also known for her political work.

== Early life and education ==
Born in Dublin, Ireland, Creed lived in London, England, as a young adult, and then moved to Boston in 1979 where she took courses at Massachusetts College of Art and Design.

In 1996, she moved to San Francisco, where she earned her BFA at California College of the Arts, graduating with high distinction.

== Career ==
Creed has worked primarily with the human figure, incorporating themes of childhood, vulnerability, and social issues.

=== Political work ===
After being invited to make an ornament (a ceramic hummingbird) for the White House Christmas tree in 2002, Creed began making variations of this work in protest of the 2003 Invasion of Iraq. This led to a series called "Babes in Arms".

Creed's political work has been published in several art books and shown in galleries in Europe and the United States.

=== Ceramic Archivists ===
Inspired by the Terra Cotta Warriors in China, Internet Archive founder Brewster Kahle invited Creed to begin making figures of employees who have worked at the Archive for three or more years. This series began in 2010, and is currently ongoing.

Prominent figures such as Ted Nelson, Brewster Kahle, and Aaron Swartz are included in this collection. Thirty-two of these figures were exhibited at "From Clay to Cloud", at Loyola Marymount University's Laband Art Gallery in Los Angeles in 2016.

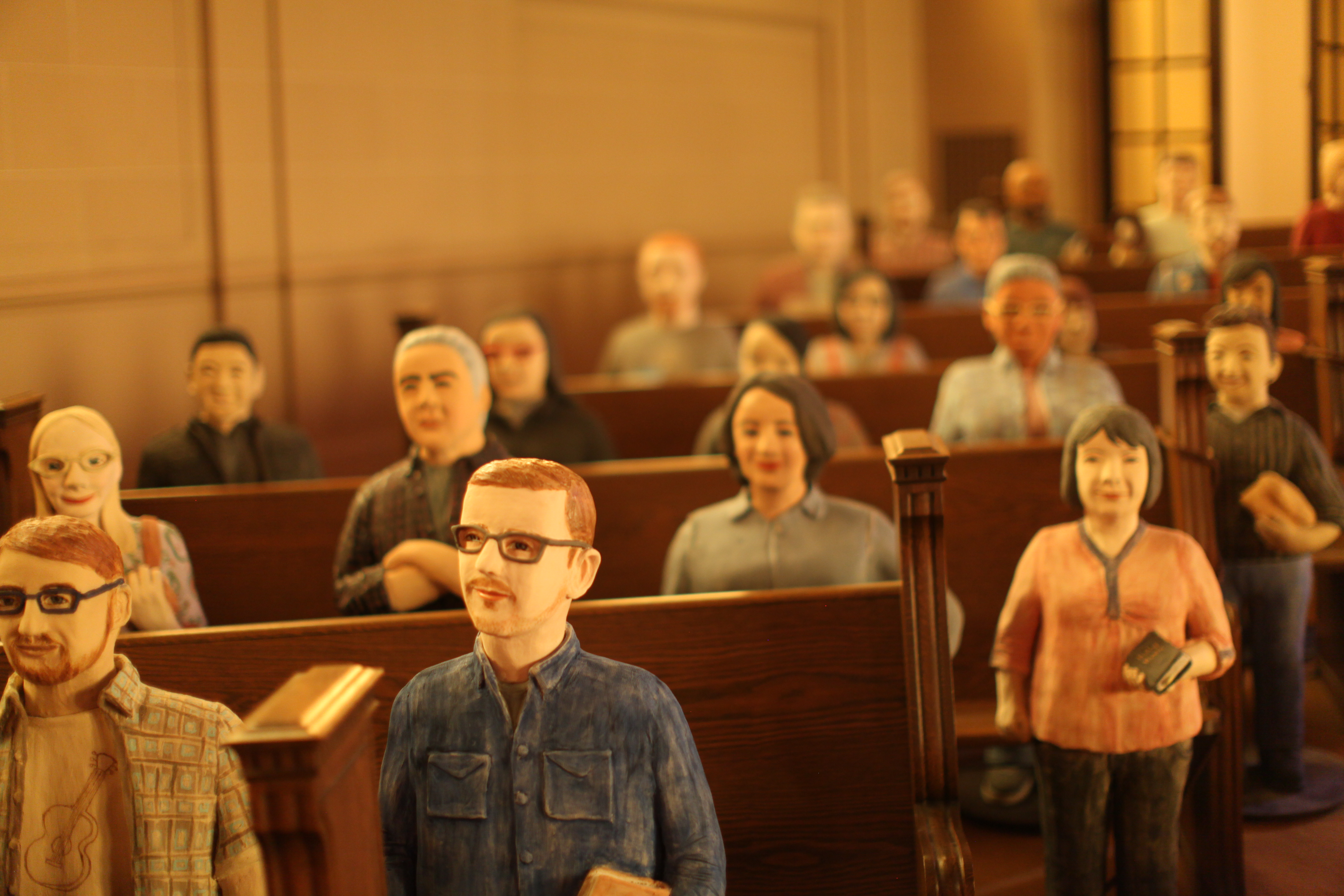
Internet archivists by Nuala Creed

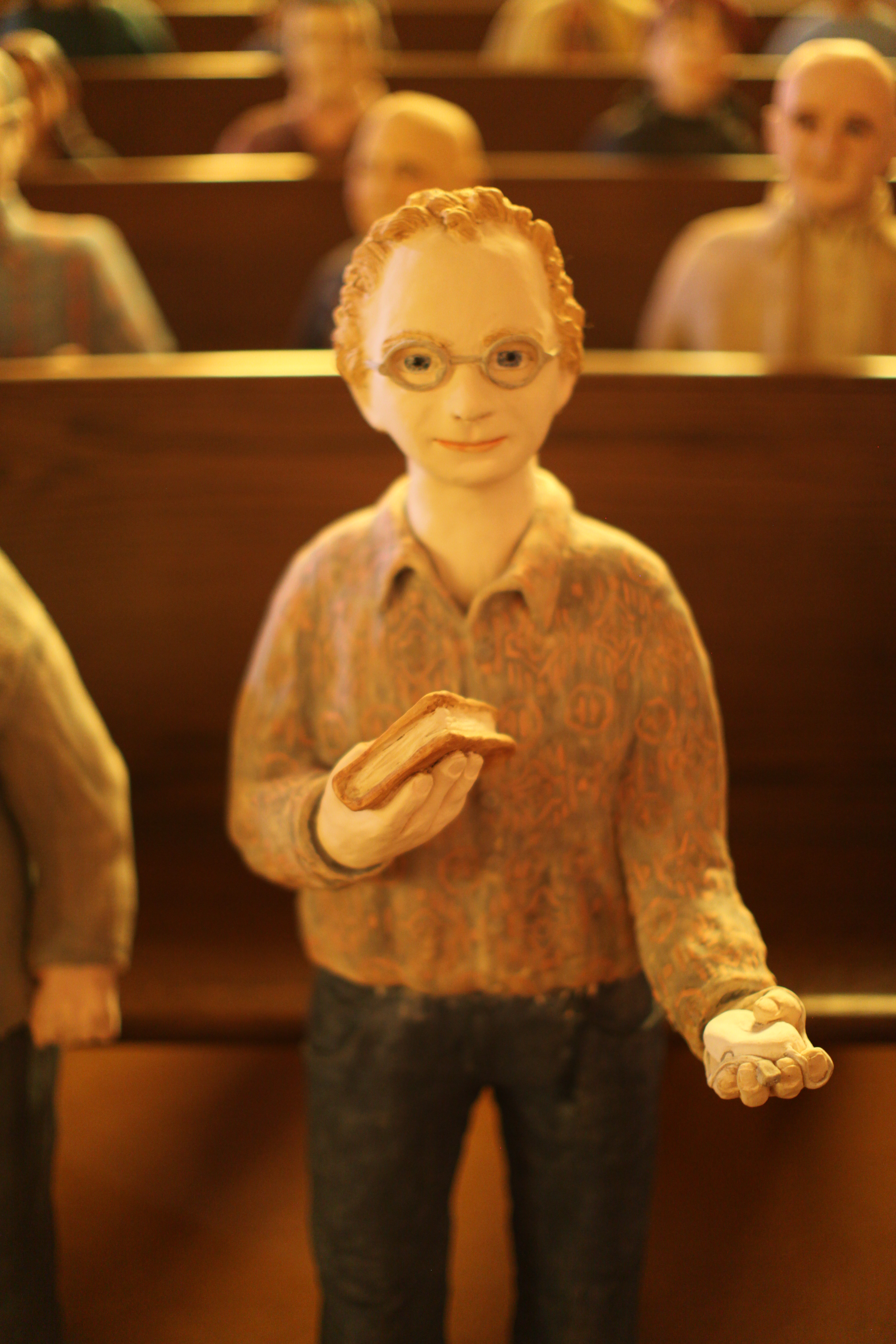
Brewster Kahle

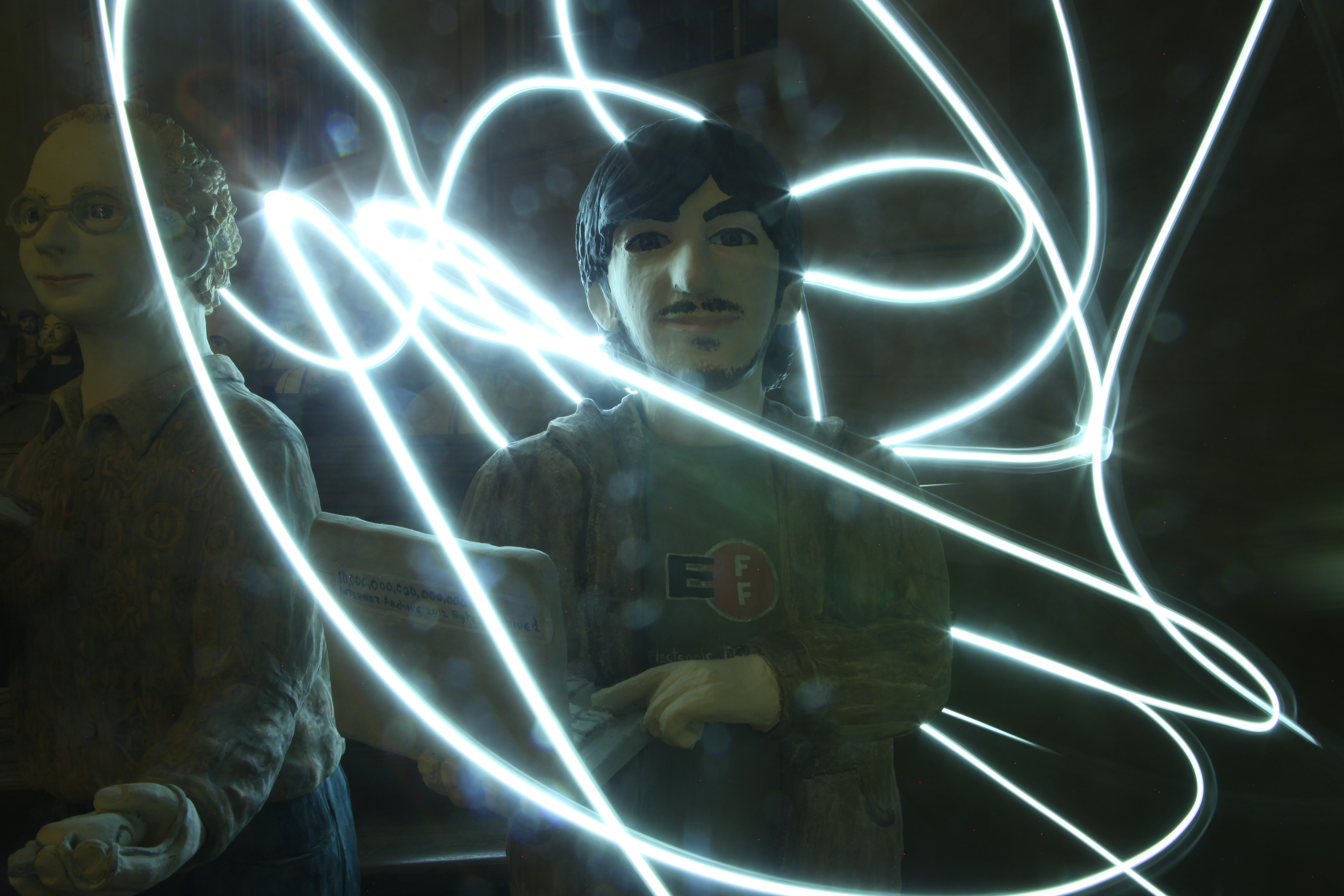
Aaron Swartz

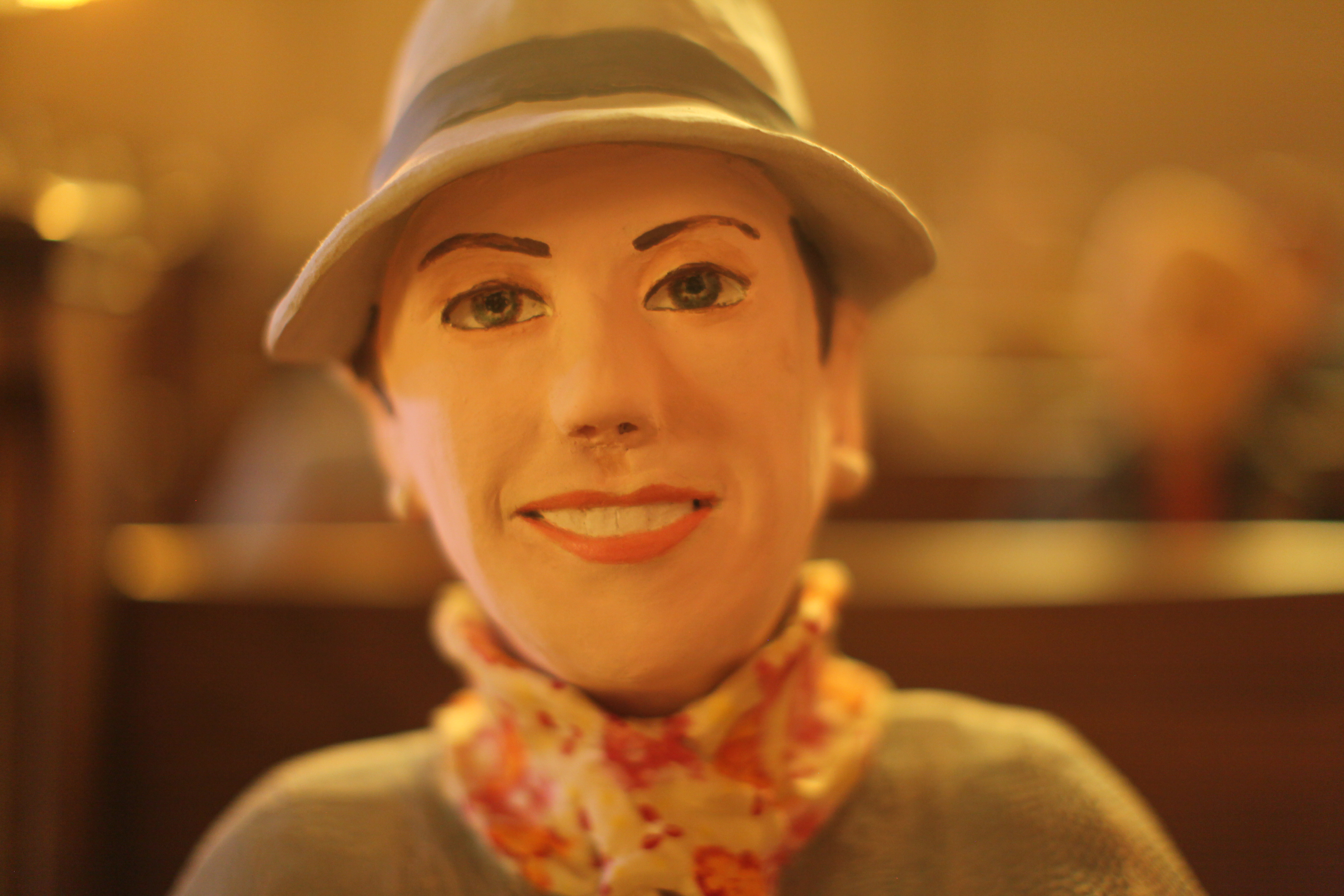
June Goldsmith

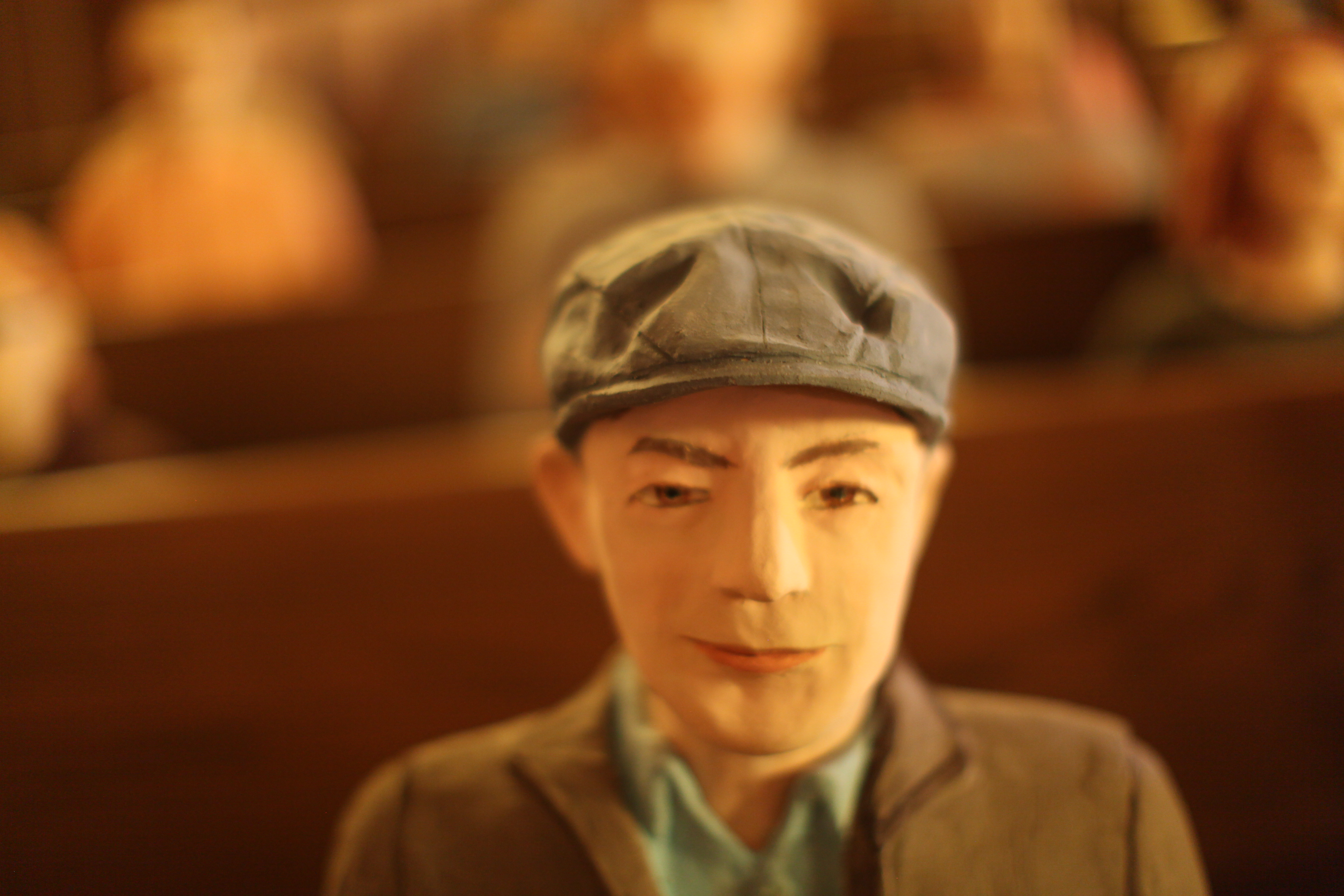
Peter Brantley
