= Hachette v. Internet Archive =

2023 American court case

Hachette Book Group, Inc. v. Internet Archive
- Court: United States District Court for the Southern District of New York
- Full case name: Hachette Book Group Inc., et al. v. Internet Archive, et al.

Court membership
- Judge sitting: John G. Koeltl

Hachette Book Group, Inc. v. Internet Archive, No. 20-cv-4160 (JGK), 664 F.Supp.3d 370 (S.D.N.Y. 2023), WL 2623787 (S.D.N.Y. 2023), was a case in which the United States District Court for the Southern District of New York determined that the Internet Archive, a registered library, committed copyright infringement by scanning and lending complete copies of certain books through controlled digital lending mechanisms. Stemming from the creation of the National Emergency Library (NEL) during the onset of the COVID-19 pandemic, publishing companies Hachette Book Group, Penguin Random House, HarperCollins, and Wiley alleged that the Internet Archive's Open Library and National Emergency Library facilitated copyright infringement of their books.

The case primarily concerns the fair use of controlled digital lending (CDL) of complete copies of certain books owned by the publishing companies that were party to the case. The case does not concern the display of short passages, limited page views, search results, books out of copyright or out of print, or books without an ebook version currently for sale.

On March 25, 2023, the court ruled on the case. In August 2023, the parties reached a negotiated judgment, including a permanent injunction barring the Internet Archive from lending complete copies through CDL of some of the plaintiffs' books. The decision was upheld by the Second Circuit Court of Appeals in September 2024, and the Internet Archive announced in December 2024 that it would not challenge further.

== Background ==
The Internet Archive is a non-profit organization and legally a library; it is governed by copyright laws specific to libraries. It is based in San Francisco, California; the Archive maintains Open Library, a digital library index and lending system. As many of the works in the Internet Archive are under copyright, the Archive used a controlled digital lending (CDL) system, a practice that relies upon digital rights management (DRM) to prevent unauthorized downloading or copying of copyrighted works. Open Library can generate digitized material (ebooks) from print copy. The Open Library CDL system ensured that only one digital copy is in use for each print copy or otherwise authorized ebook copy available.

On March 24, 2020, following shutdowns caused by the COVID-19 pandemic, the Internet Archive opened the National Emergency Library, removing the waitlists used in Open Library and expanding access to these books for all readers. More than one user could borrow a book at the same time. Two months later, on June 1, the National Emergency Library (NEL) was met with a lawsuit from four book publishers. Two weeks after that, on June 16, the Internet Archive closed the NEL, and the prior Open Library CDL system resumed after the 12 weeks of NEL usage.

== Lawsuit ==
On June 1, 2020, Hachette Book Group and other publishers, including Penguin Random House, HarperCollins, and Wiley, filed a lawsuit against the Internet Archive for the National Emergency Library. The plaintiffs argued that the practice of CDL was illegal and not protected by the doctrine of fair use. Furthermore, they argued that the Internet Archive was not abiding by CDL, as it had acknowledged that its partner libraries were not always withdrawing their physical copies from their shelves.

By June 2022, both parties to the case requested summary judgment for the case, each favoring their respective sides; Judge John G. Koeltl approved of a summary judgment hearing to take place later in 2022. No summary judgment was issued, and instead a first hearing was held on March 20, 2023. Over the course of the hearing, Koeltl appeared unmoved by the Internet Archive's fair use claims and unconvinced that the publishers' market for library e-books was not impacted by their practice.

The 127 publishers' books in the suit are also available as ebooks from the publishers. The Internet Archive said afterwards it would appeal this ruling, but otherwise would continue other digital book services which have been previously cleared under case law, such as books for reading-impaired users.

Senator Thom Tillis of North Carolina, chairman of the intellectual property subcommittee on the Senate Judiciary Committee, said in a letter to the Internet Archive that he was "concerned that the Internet Archive thinks that it—not Congress—gets to determine the scope of copyright law".

As part of its response to the publishers' lawsuit, in late 2020 the Archive launched a campaign called Empowering Libraries (hashtag #EmpoweringLibraries) that portrayed the lawsuit as a threat to all libraries.

In a 2021 preprint article, Argyri Panezi argued that the case "presents two important, but separate questions related to the electronic access to library works; first, it raises questions around the legal practice of digital lending, and second, it asks whether emergency use of copyrighted material might be fair use" and argued that libraries have a public service role to enable "future generations to keep having equal access—or opportunities to access—a plurality of original sources".

=== Internet Archive press conference ===
Shortly before oral arguments, the Internet Archive held a press conference with comments from several people who implied that the issues in this case were much broader than the 127 books specifically named in the suit. All presenters agreed that book publishers need to make money to pay their expenses including authors. The question is whether the National Emergency Library (NEL) actually harmed the publishers.

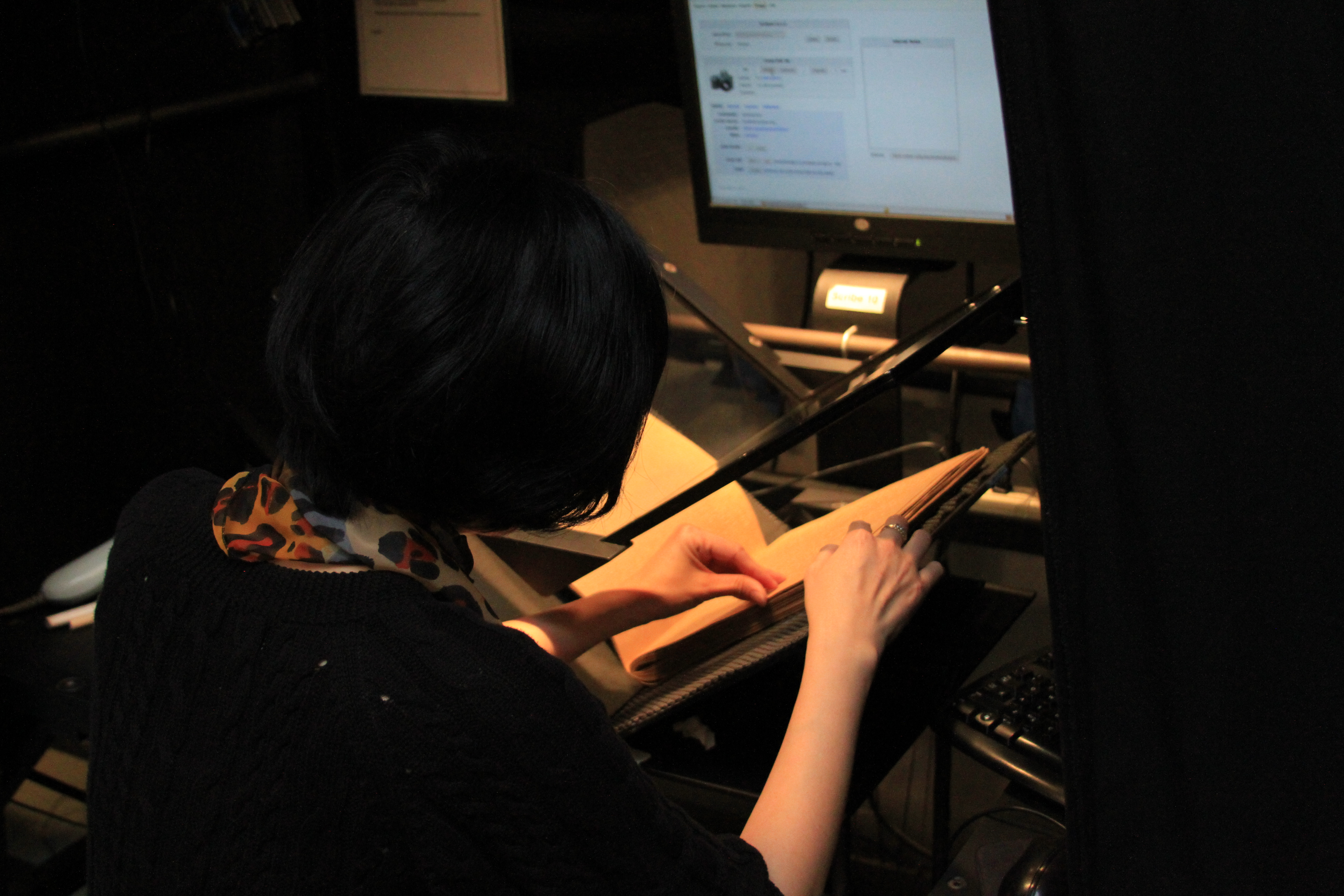
The Internet Archive's practice of scanning and lending books is central to Hachette v. Internet Archive.

Lila Bailey, Senior Policy Counsel for the Internet Archive, noted that:

In the past, publishers stood against microfilm and photocopiers, crying harm. They said they would be harmed by interlibrary loan. They lobbied for decades against libraries being allowed to provide access for the blind and print disabled. They were wrong. It took years, but eventually, the law affirmed each of these things, and the public benefitted. With this lawsuit, publishers have repeated those same claims of massive harm from controlled digital lending. ... When asked under oath, their own executives admitted this. ... [They even] instructed their own 950 dollar per hour expert not to even try to measure economic harm. ... On the other hand, when we invited economists from Northeastern University and the University of Copenhagen to look at the sales and library lending data produced in this case, they came to a singular conclusion: The Internet Archive's digital lending had no measurable effect on the market whatsoever.

Bailey's conclusion was supported by other speakers.

Harvard Law School Professor Lawrence Lessig said that book publishers need to make a profit to serve the public, but the material available to the public should not be limited to what commercial enterprises find profitable. Netflix, for example, offers subscribers access to thousands of movies and television shows but routinely stops offering content for which the demand is too low. That doesn't happen with libraries. Without controlled digital lending, out-of-print books become essentially unavailable to the vast majority of humanity. "We need access to our past, not just the part of our past that is economically or commercially viable."

=== Expert reports ===
An expert report filed with the court by Northeastern economics professor Imke Reimers also reported that "sales in the first five years after an edition's publication account for up to 90% of lifetime sales."

On the other side, University of Chicago computer science professor Ian Foster reported that the Internet Archive's actual CDL practices sometimes violated their claims, lending out more copies than they physically had.

=== Final judgment ===
Judge John G. Koeltl ruled on March 24, 2023, granting the publishers' request. He held that the Internet Archive's scanning and lending of complete copies constituted copyright infringement and that the Internet Archive's fair use defense failed all four factors of the "fair use test". He rejected the Archive's argument that their use was "transformative" in the sense of copyright law. He further stated that "Even full enforcement of a one-to-one owned-to-loaned ratio, however, would not excuse [Internet Archive's] reproduction of the Works in Suit". Internet Archive founder Brewster Kahle declared their intention to appeal the ruling.

While Judge Koeltl issued a summary judgment in favor of the plaintiffs and against the defendant, he did not assess damages. Instead, he directed the parties to brief the court on how they thought the case should be resolved in a way that comports with the judge's decision. The deadline for this was extended several times; the final extension was granted on July 28, extending the deadline to August 11, 2023, with Judge Koeltl writing, "No further extensions."

On August 11, 2023, the parties reached a negotiated judgment. The agreement prescribes a permanent injunction preventing Internet Archive from loaning the plaintiffs' books in full through CDL, except those for which no e-book is currently available for sale from the publisher, as well as an undisclosed payment to the plaintiffs. The agreement also preserves the right for the Internet Archive to appeal the previous ruling. As a result of the lawsuit, more than 500,000 books were made unavailable from loaning in full through CDL. The Internet Archive appealed to restore full CDL access to the affected books.

=== Appeal ===
On September 11, 2023, the Internet Archive filed a notice which appealed the ruling to the United States Court of Appeals for the Second Circuit. On December 15, 2023, the Internet Archive filed its opening brief in its appeal. Shortly afterwards, several other organizations filed friend of the court briefs. The oral argument phase of the appeal occurred on June 28, 2024.

On September 4, 2024, the Second Circuit Court of Appeals affirmed the lower court rulings. The court stated "On the one hand, eBook licensing fees may impose a burden on libraries and reduce access to creative work. On the other hand, authors have a right to be compensated in connection with the copying and distribution of their original creations. Congress balanced these 'competing claims upon the public interest' in the Copyright Act. We must uphold that balance here." The Internet Archive did not petition to have the case reviewed by the Supreme Court of the United States by the Second Circuit's deadline in December 2024, leaving the court injunction in place.

== Other responses ==
=== Association of American Publishers ===
The Association of American Publishers released a press statement that said, "In celebrating the opinion, we also thank the thousands of public libraries across the country that serve their communities everyday [sic] through lawful eBook licenses. We hope the opinion will prove educational to the defendant and anyone else who finds public laws inconvenient to their own interests." The AAP has been critical of the Internet Archive for suggesting that libraries engage in the same practices that they do, arguing that only 13 public libraries in the US had cooperated with the Open Library.

== See also ==
- Authors Guild, Inc. v. Google, Inc.
- Authors Guild, Inc. v. HathiTrust
- Universal Music Group v. Internet Archive
