= Open Book Alliance =

Book organization

The Open Book Alliance was an organization formed in 2009 to contest the Google Book Search Settlement, which it believed could allow Google, the Association of American Publishers and the Authors Guild collectively "to monopolize the access, distribution and pricing of the largest digital database of books in the world". It was led by antitrust lawyer Gary Reback. The Settlement was rejected by a federal judge in March 2011 and the Alliance's blog was inactive after 31 May 2012.

Wayback Machine archived the blog from 26 August 2009 to 14 August 2016.

Between 14 August 2016 and 18 August 2016 the domain name expired. it is now an unrelated commercial site.

Its members were: Amazon.com, American Society of Journalists and Authors, Council of Literary Magazines and Presses, Internet Archive, Microsoft, National Writers Union, New York Library Association, Science Fiction and Fantasy Writers of America, Small Press Distribution, Special Libraries Association and Yahoo!.
