= Internet Archive Scholar =

Academic search service

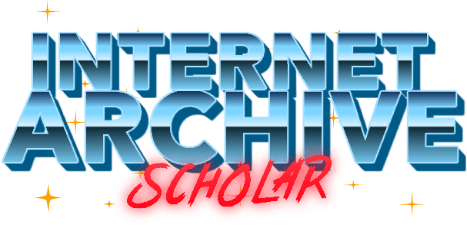
- Website type: Bibliographic database
- Founded: 2020
- Website: https://scholar.archive.org/
- Commercial: No

The Internet Archive Scholar is a scholarly search engine created by the Internet Archive in 2020. As of February 2024, it contained over 35 million research articles with full text access. The materials available come from three different forms: content identified by the Wayback Machine, by digitized print material and sources such as uploads from users and collections from partnerships.

== Reception ==
In 2024, Katina Magazine reviewed the tool noting that it was slower, slightly less recent and less comprehensive than Google Scholar but provided more context per result making it easier to read for the reviewer, provided filters for datasets and makes its bibliographic database public. Also, due to its nonprofit mission, would remain free, open and transparent into the future helping to preserve materials that sometimes get lost over time. The review described IA Scholar as user-friendly though users may need to re-learn how to perform some search techniques that work differently on Elasticsearch.
