= Internet Archive building =

Building in San Francisco, California, US

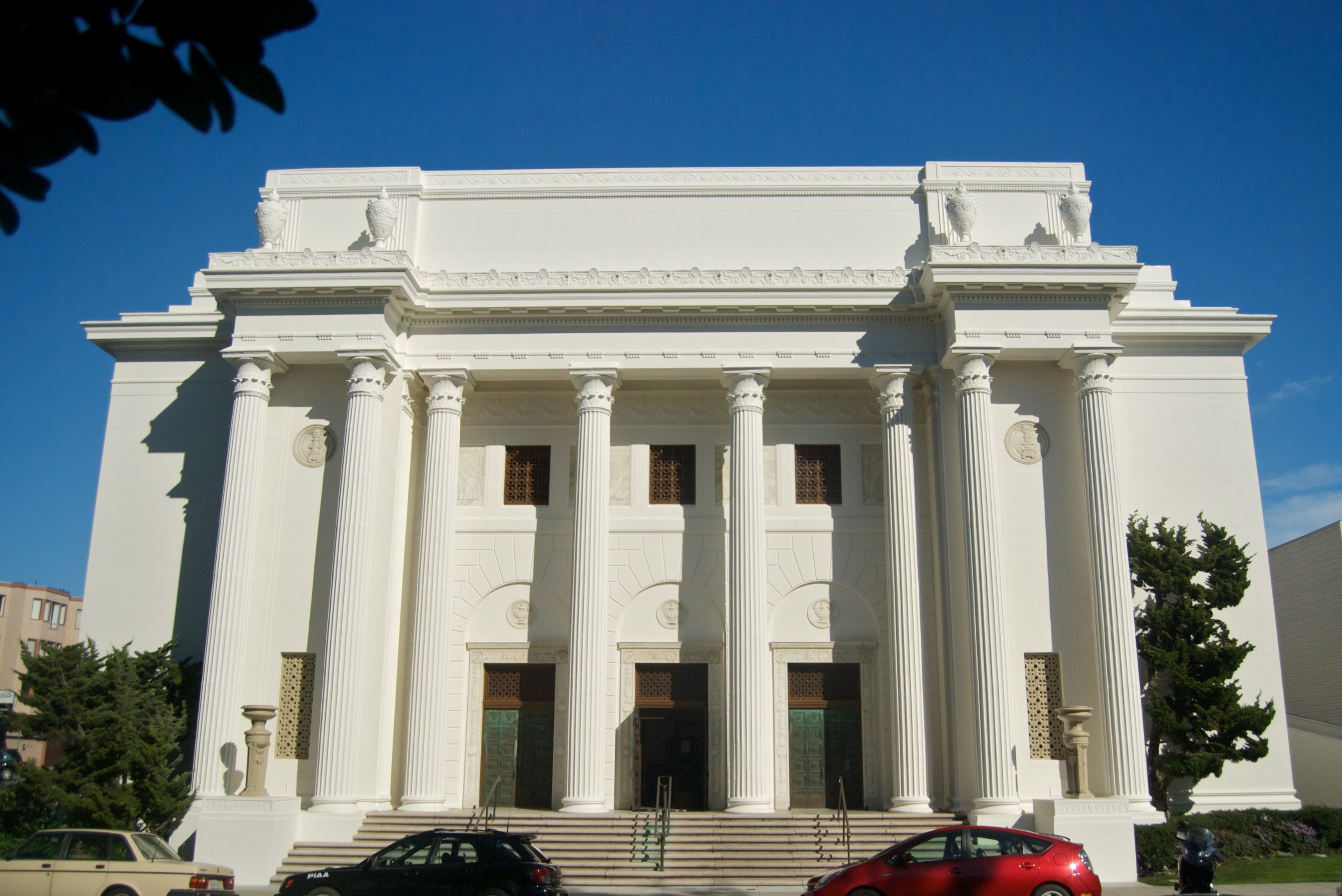
- Former Fourth Church of Christ, Scientist building
- Interactive map of the Internet Archive building area

General information
- Architectural style: Classical Revival
- Location: 300 Funston Ave., San Francisco, California, United States
- Coordinates: 37°46′56.3″N 122°28′17.65″W
- Completed: 1923
- Cost: $175,000
- Client: Fourth Church of Christ, Scientist

Technical details
- Size: 23,000 square feet

Design and construction
- Architect: Carl Werner

The Internet Archive building, originally built for the Fourth Church of Christ, Scientist, is a historic building located at 300 Funston Avenue, corner of Clement Street, in the Richmond District of San Francisco, California. Built in 1923, it was designed by noted San Francisco architect Carl Werner in the Classical Revival style with Corinthian columns. The approximately 23,000 square feet (2,100 m^{2}) building is now the headquarters of the Internet Archive.

== History ==
Before the building was completed, cost estimates were made for its total cost. In 1922, it was first estimated to cost $125,000 on August 5, but then its estimate was updated to $150,000 on August 24. In November 1923, a San Francisco Chronicle estimated a projected $175,000 for the project.

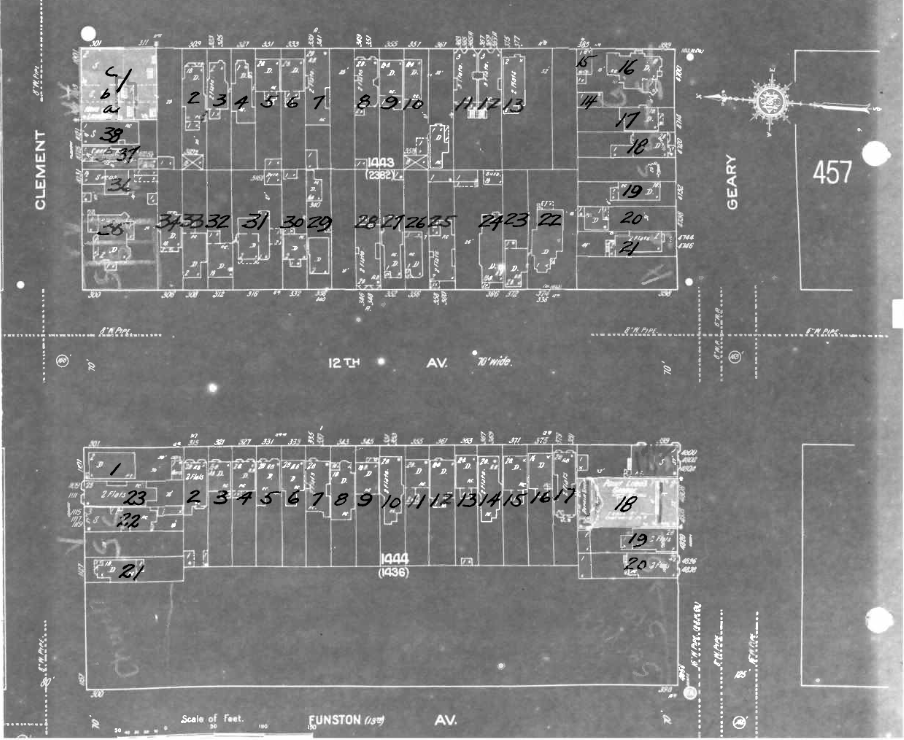
1919 Sanborn map with a note showing the upcoming church

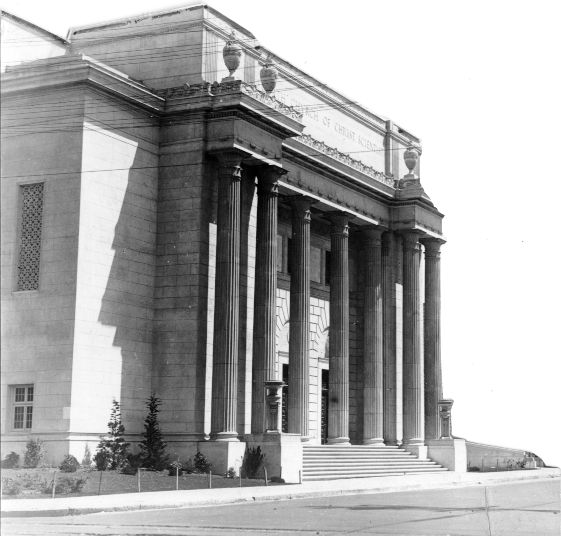
Fourth Church of Christ, Scientist (1930)

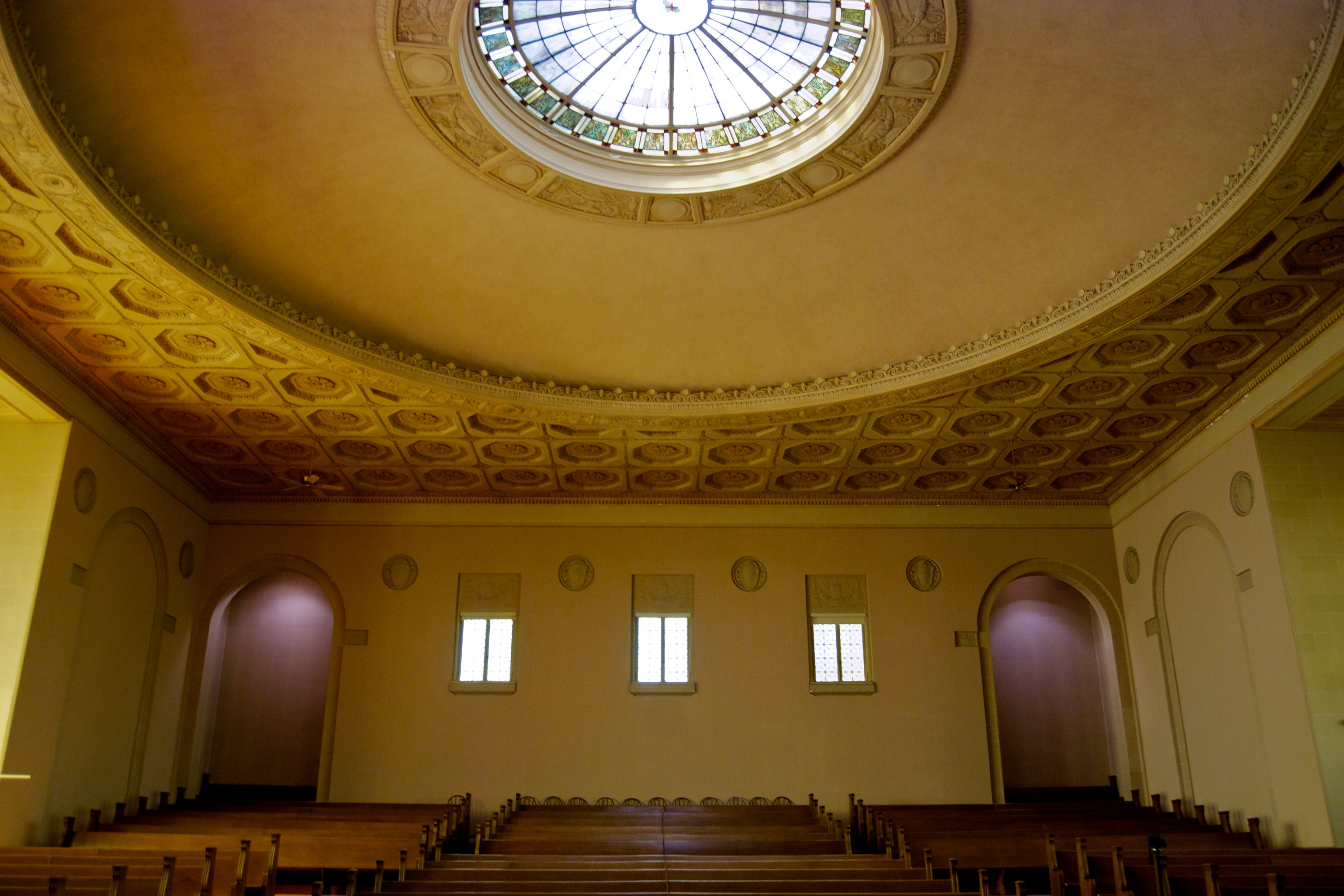
Great Room (2010)

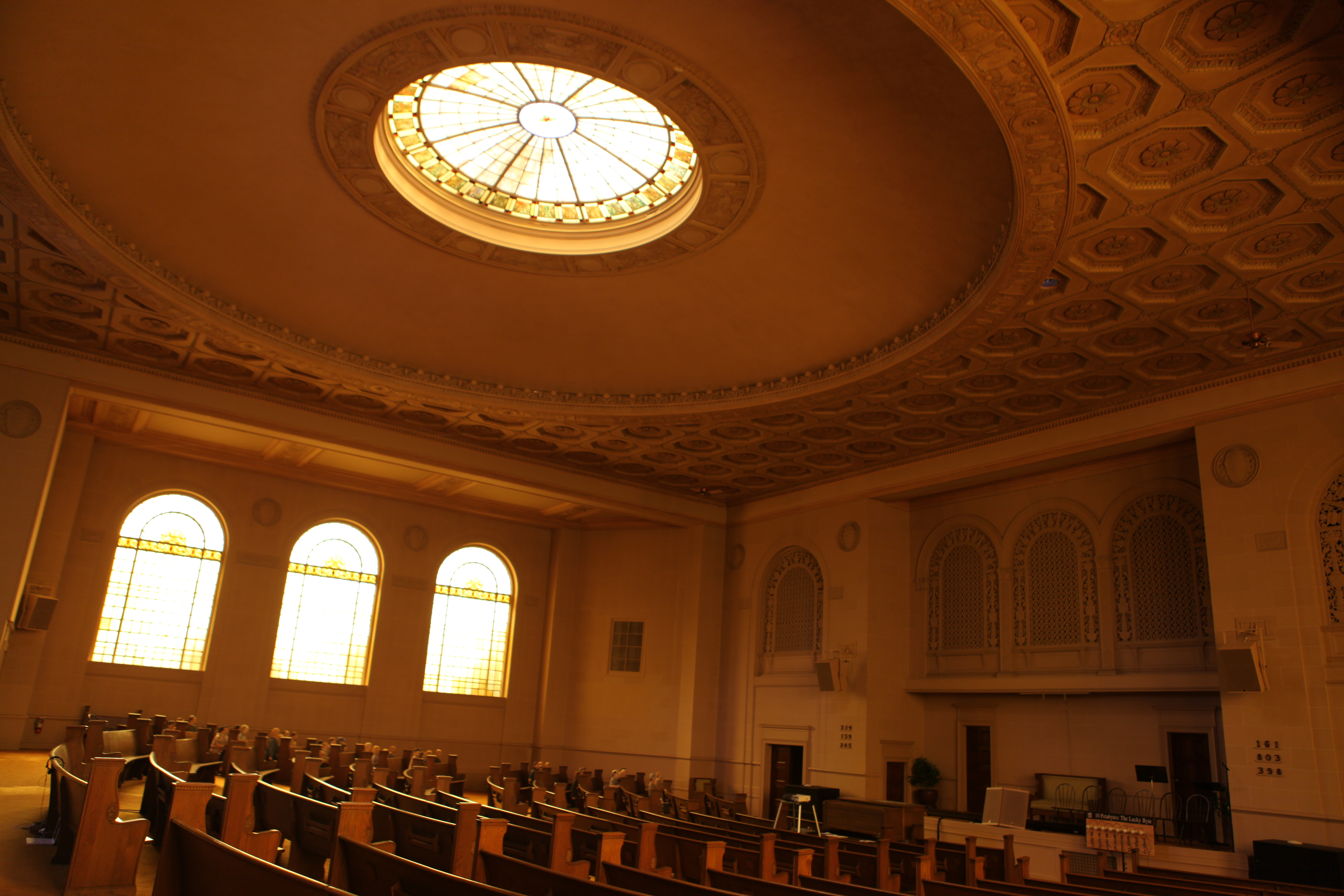
Great Room (2013)

Due to the dwindling size of its congregation and the increased cost of maintaining such a large building, the building was sold in September 2009 to the Internet Archive for $4.5 million. The Archive chose the church based on its Greek Revival design, which resembles the logo of the Internet Archive, which features the Library of Alexandria. A 2021 SF Chronicle article described the main room as cavernous, quiet and "diffused with a golden light that filters through the windows." The auditorium has hymn numbers on either side of the stage, including 200, 404 and 451, representing the http status codes for successfully loaded page, unsuccessful, and blocked for legal reasons respectively. The room also houses servers on the back wall that held 1/10th of the archives online material as of 2024 and, since 2009, the room has been home to terracotta sculptures of employees who have worked at the Archive for more than three years.

On November 6, 2013, a side building built in the 1940’s as a Christian Science reading room at Internet Archive's headquarters in San Francisco's Richmond District caught fire, destroying equipment and damaging some nearby apartments. According to The Archive, it lost the side-building that housed one of 30 of its scanning centers; cameras, lights, and scanning equipment worth hundreds of thousands of dollars; and "maybe 20 boxes of books and film, some irreplaceable, most already digitized, and some replaceable". The nonprofit Archive sought donations to cover the estimated $600,000 in damage.

Founder and Digital Librarian Brewster Kahle often leads the free public tour of the archive that is given every Friday after lunch.

== See also ==
- List of former Christian Science churches, societies and buildings
- Misalignment Museum
