= Universal Music Group v. Internet Archive =

2024 American court case

- Court: United States District Court for the Southern District of New York
- Full case name: Universal Music Group v. Internet Archive

Universal Music Group v. Internet Archive, 542 F.Supp. 1156 (2024), was a legal case argued in the United States District Court for the Southern District of New York regarding digital copies of records made by digital library the Internet Archive. The case was dropped after an undisclosed agreement was reached.

== Plaintiff ==
The plaintiffs were Universal Music, Sony Music and Concord, some of the largest music recording companies in the world.

== Defendant ==
The defendant, Internet Archive, is a non-profit organization based in San Francisco, California. It makes digital copies of 78-rpm records that are 70 to 120 years old and makes them available online. It has been argued that such practice is protected by the doctrine of fair use.

Several musicians have signed an open letter expressing support for the actions of the Internet Archive.

== Settlement ==
In September 2025, both sides reached undisclosed settlement terms, and requested the case to be dropped. A post on the Internet Archive's blog read, "The parties have reached a confidential resolution of all claims and will have no further public comment on this matter." The Recording Industry Association of America made a similar statement about a confidential agreement and that there would be no further comment. The request to dismiss the lawsuit was then granted on October 16, 2025.

== See also ==
- Hachette v. Internet Archive
- Authors Guild, Inc. v. Google, Inc.
- Authors Guild, Inc. v. HathiTrust
