= Memory of the World Register in Europe and North America =

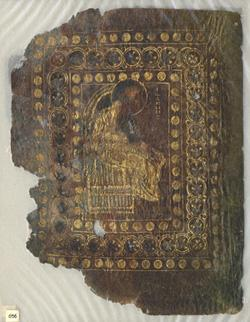
Albania's Codex Beratinus is a Greek uncial codex of the New Testament that has been dated paleographically to the 6th century.

UNESCO's Memory of the World International Register lists documentary heritage – texts, audio-visual materials, library and archive holdings – that have been judged to be of global importance. The register brings that heritage to the attention of experts and the wider public, promoting the preservation, digitization, and dissemination of those materials.

The first inscriptions were added to the register in 1997. As of 2025, 570 pieces of documentary heritage had been included in the register. Of these, 315 (55%) are nominated or co-nominated by countries in the Europe and North America region. These include recordings of folk music; ancient languages and phonetics; aged remnants of religious and secular manuscripts; collective lifetime works of renowned giants of literature; science and music; copies of landmark motion pictures and short films; and archives documenting significant political, economic, and social changes.

== Inscriptions by country/territory ==
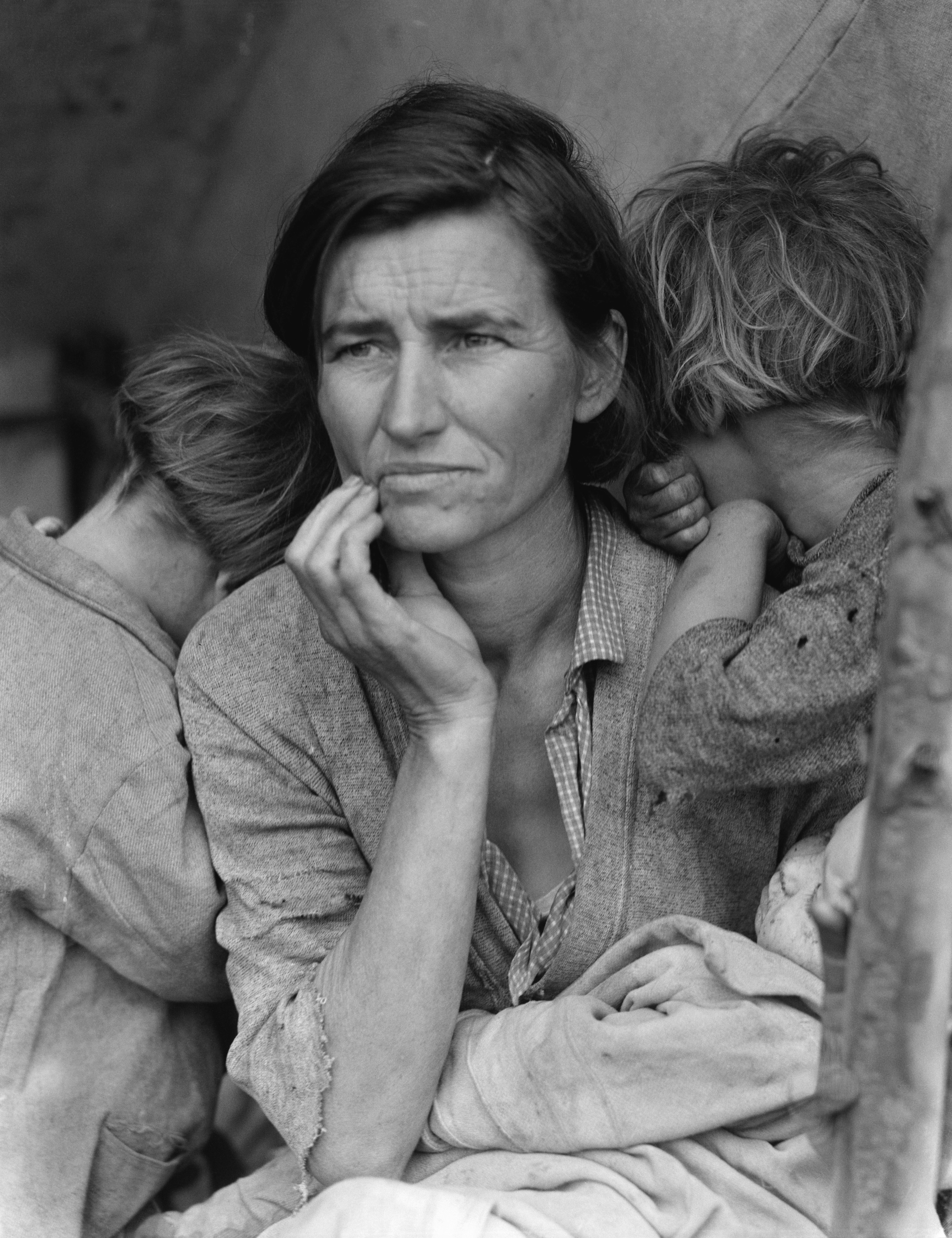
The Family of Man, on permanent display in Luxembourg, is regarded by some as the "greatest photographic enterprise ever undertaken".

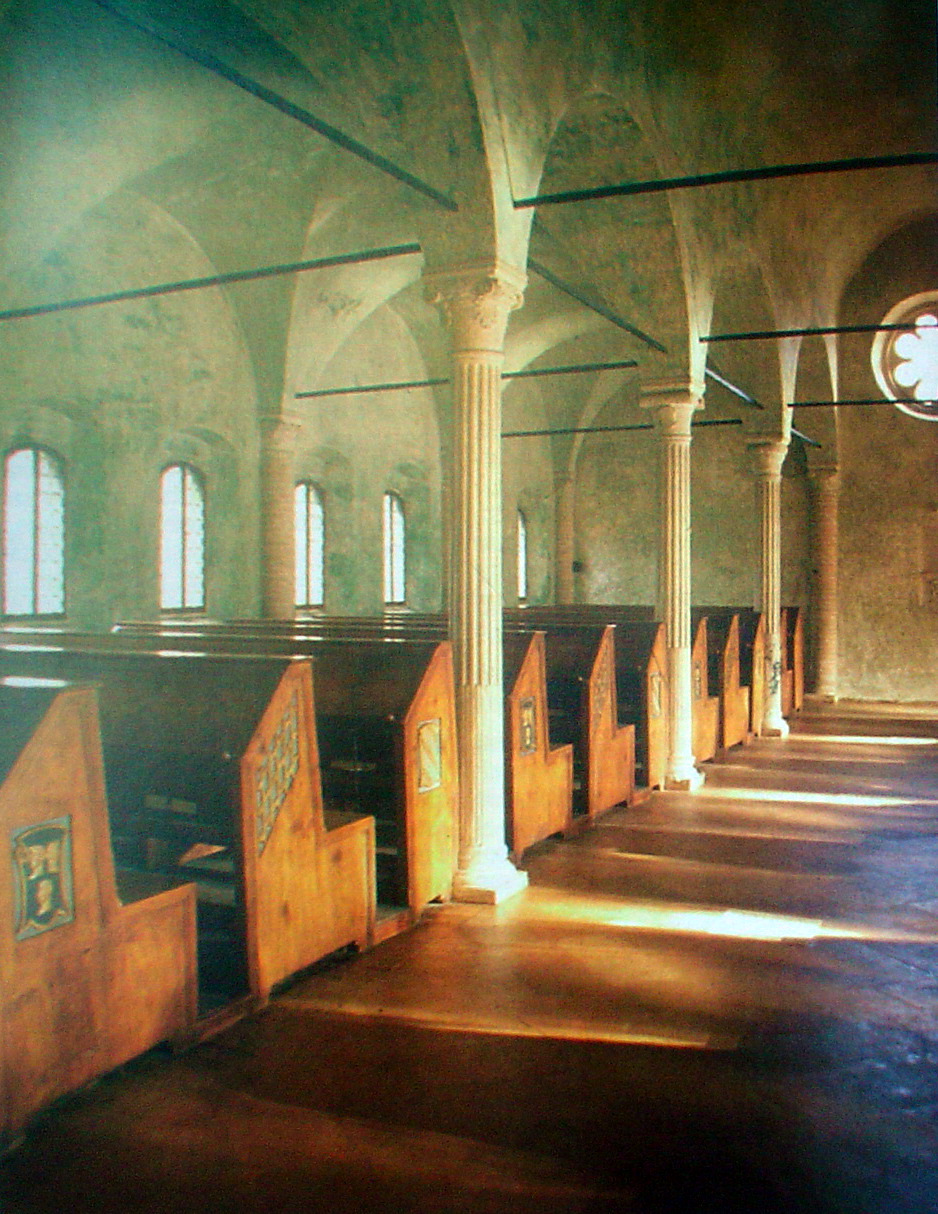
Malatesta Novello Library

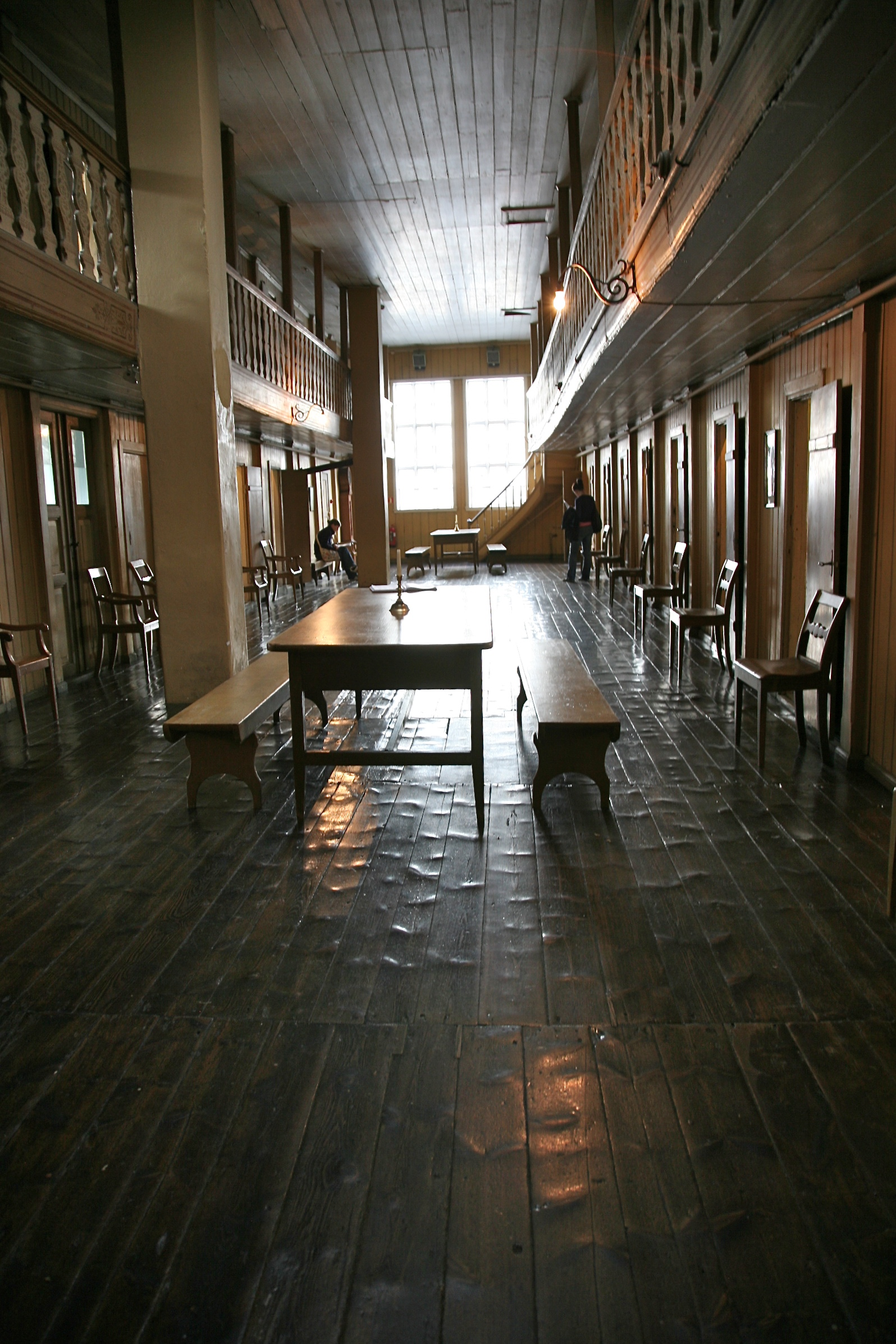
Gerhard Armauer Hansen discovered the causative agent of leprosy and worked at St. George's Hospital, now the hub of The Leprosy Archives of Bergen.

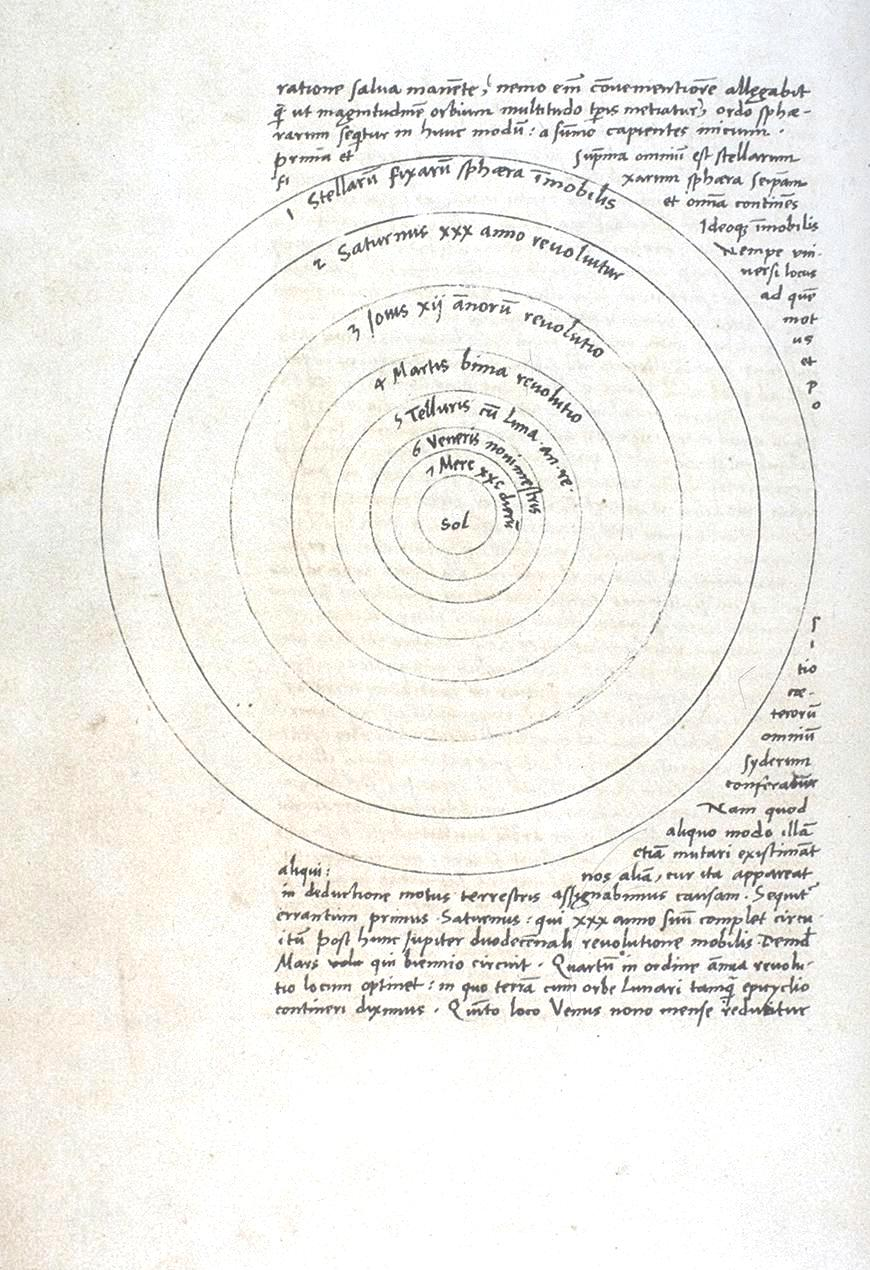
De revolutionibus orbium coelestium is the seminal work on heliocentric theory and the masterpiece of astronomer Nicolaus Copernicus (1473–1543).

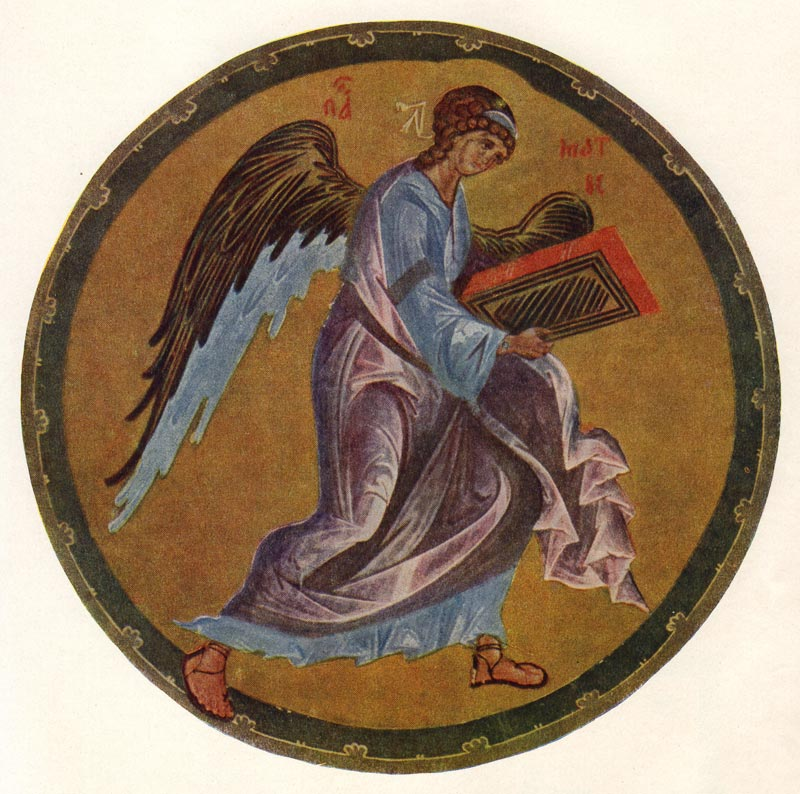
The Khitrovo Gospel gives a salient idea of the stage of the development of ancient Russian literature, of its book-writing schools and workshops and of the dissemination of the church Slavonic language.

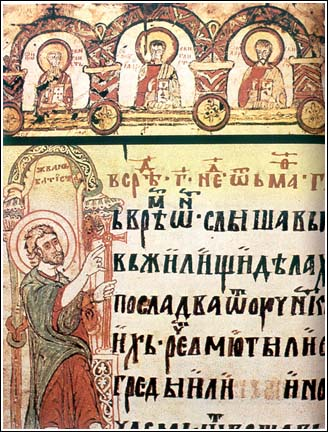
Serbia's Miroslav Gospel, a manuscript dating from around 1180 with miniatures of outstanding beauty, reflects the fusion of elements of the West (Italy) and the East (Byzantium).

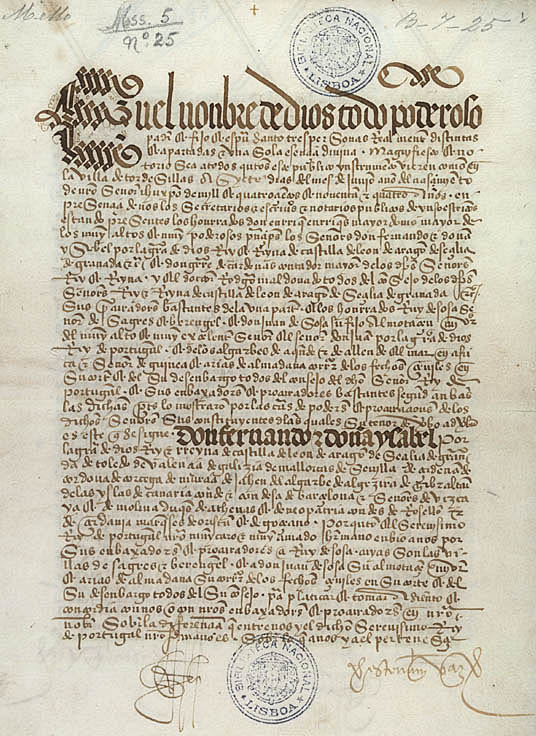
The Treaty of Tordesillas divided the "newly discovered" lands outside Europe between Spain and Portugal during the dawn of the Age of Discovery.

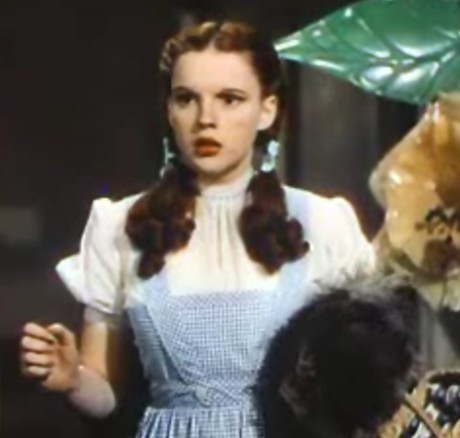
The Wizard of Oz is a 1939 cinema classic. Here Dorothy Gale (Judy Garland) arrives in Munchkinland.

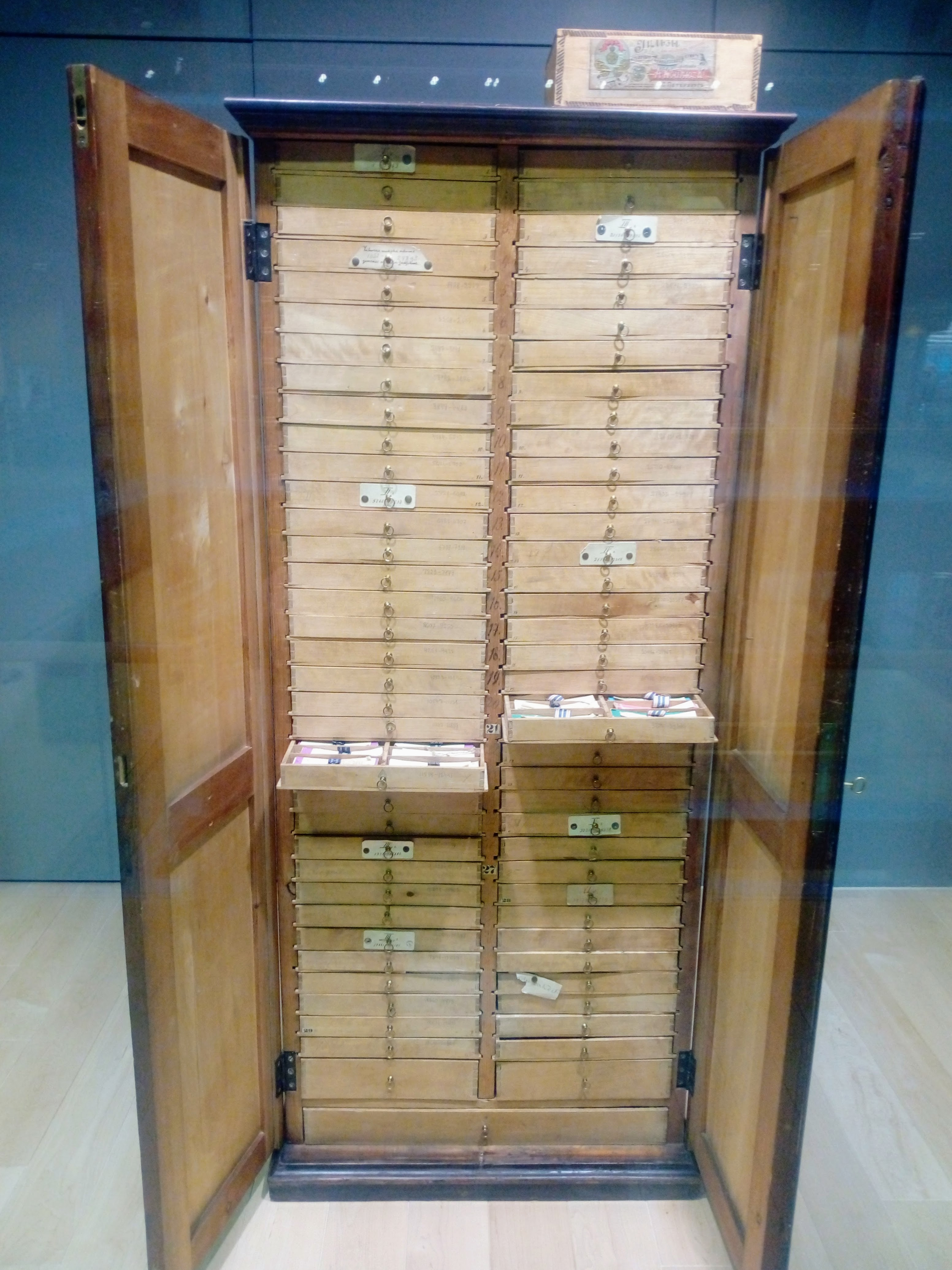
The Cabinet of Folksongs, a collection of almost 218,000 Latvian folksong texts

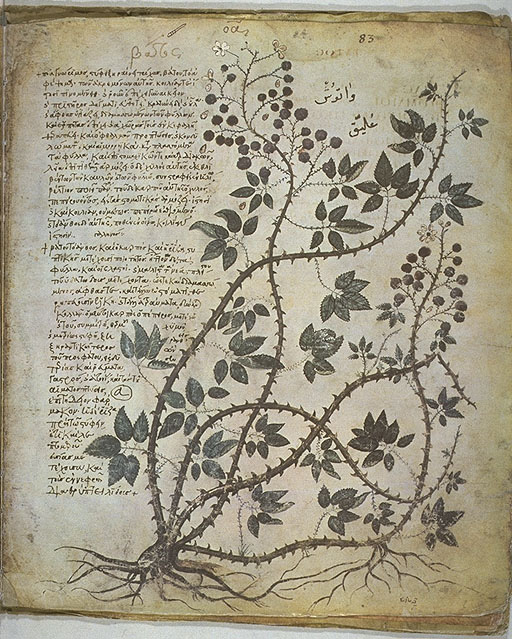
The Vienna Dioscurides of Austria can be considered as the most important pharmaceutical source of the Ancient World and was used throughout the Middle Ages, Renaissance and in later centuries as a dictionary for medical practitioners.

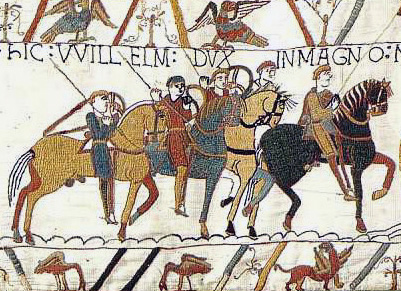
The Bayeux Tapestry from France is a 50 cm by 70 m (20 in by 230 ft) long embroidered cloth—not an actual tapestry—which explains the events leading up to the Norman conquest of England as well as the events of the invasion itself.

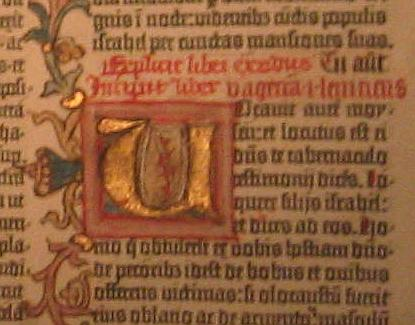
Germany's 42-line Gutenberg Bible is the first book printed in Europe with movable type.

Documentary heritage^{[A]}	Country/Territory	Custodian(s), Location(s)	Year inscribed	Reference
Codex Purpureus Beratinus	Albania	National Archives of Albania, Tirana 41°18′09″N 19°48′45″E	2005	
Marubi National Museum of Photography: Archive of negatives, objects and documents of the Pietro Marubbi and Kel Marubi	Albania	Marubi National Museum of Photography, Shkodër	2025	
Mashtots Matenadaran ancient manuscripts collection	Armenia	Mashtots Institute of Ancient Manuscripts, Yerevan 40°11′31″N 44°31′15″E	1997	
First Byurakan Survey (FBS or Markarian survey)	Armenia	Byurakan Astrophysical Observatory, Armenian National Academy of Sciences 40°19′49″N 44°16′24″E	2011	
Collection of note manuscripts and film music of Composer Aram Khachaturian	Armenia	House-Museum of Aram Khachaturian 40°11′25″N 44°30′48″E	2013	
Collection of Works of the Composer Komitas Vardapet	Armenia	Komitas Museum-Institute 40°09′46″N 44°30′09″E	2023	
The Lawcode of Mkhitar Gosh	Armenia	Mesrop Mashtots Institute of Ancient Manuscripts, Yerevan	2025	
Vienna Dioscurides	Austria	Austrian National Library, Vienna 48°12′22″N 16°22′00″E	1997	
Final Document of the Congress of Vienna	Austria	Austrian State Archives, Vienna 48°11′30″N 16°24′45″E	1997	
The Historical Collections (1899–1950) of the Vienna Phonogrammarchiv	Austria	Austrian Academy of Sciences, Vienna 48°12′35″N 16°23′06″E	1999	
Papyrus Erzherzog Rainer	Austria	Austrian National Library, Vienna 48°12′22″N 16°22′00″E	2001	
The Vienna City Library Schubert Collection	Austria	Vienna City Library, Vienna 48°12′41″N 16°21′28″E	2001	
The Atlas Blaeu-Van der Hem of the Austrian National Library	Austria	Austrian National Library, Vienna 48°12′22″N 16°22′00″E	2003	
Brahms Collection	Austria	Society of Friends of Music, Vienna 48°12′03″N 16°22′22″E	2005	
Collection of Gothic Architectural Drawings	Austria	Academy of Fine Arts, Vienna 48°12′04″N 16°21′54″E	2005	
The Tabula Peutingeriana	Austria	Austrian National Library, Vienna 48°12′22″N 16°22′00″E	2007	
The Bibliotheca Corviniana Collection	Austria, Belgium, France, Germany, Hungary, Italy	National Széchényi Library 47°29′43″N 19°02′22″E; Austrian National Library, Vienna 48°12′22″N 16°22′00″E; Biblioteca Medicea Laurenziana 43°46′28″N 11°15′15″E; Herzog August Bibliothek Wolfenbüttel 52°09′52″N 10°31′49″E; Bavarian State Library 48°08′51″N 11°34′49″E; National Library of France, Paris 48°50′01″N 2°22′33″E; Koninklijke Bibliotheek Van Belgie 48°12′22″N 16°22′00″E	2005	
Arnold Schönberg Estate	Austria	Arnold Schönberg Center Private Foundation 48°11′57″N 16°22′39″E	2011	
Mainz Psalter at the Austrian National Library	Austria	Austrian National Library, Vienna 48°12′22″N 16°22′00″E	2011	
The Documents on the Semmering Railway from the Imperial & Royal Historical Museum of Austrian Railways	Austria	Vienna Technical Museum 48°11′27″N 16°19′05″E	2017	
Medieval manuscripts on medicine and pharmacy	Azerbaijan	Institute of Manuscripts of Azerbaijan, National Academy of Sciences, Baku 40°22′11″N 49°50′10″E	2005	
The copy of the manuscript of Mahammad Fuzuli's "divan"	Azerbaijan	Institute of Manuscripts of Azerbaijan, National Academy of Sciences 40°22′11″N 49°50′10″E	2017	
"Flower Book" of Khurshidbanu Natavan – album of illustrated verses	Azerbaijan	Institute of Manuscripts of Azerbaijan, National Academy of Sciences 40°22′11″N 49°50′10″E	2023	
Radziwills’ Archives and Niasvizh (Nieśwież) Library Collection	Belarus, Finland, Lithuania, Poland, Russia, Ukraine	Central Archives of Historical Records, Warsaw 52°15′00″N 21°00′30″E; National Historical Archives of Belarus 53°55′10″N 27°33′25″E; State Historical Archives of Lithuania 54°40′54″N 25°16′24″E; Central State Historical Archives of Ukraine 49°50′23″N 24°02′04″E; Department of Rare Books and Manuscripts, Central Science Library of the National Academy of Sciences of Belarus 53°55′12″N 27°36′00″E; National Library of Belarus 53°55′52″N 27°38′46″E; Presidential Library of the Republic of Belarus 53°53′45″N 27°32′46″E; Library of the Russian Academy of Sciences 59°56′38″N 30°17′50″E; Science Library of Moscow State University 55°41′56″N 37°31′25″E; National Library of Finland 60°10′13″N 24°57′01″E	2009	
Business Archives of the Officina Plantiniana	Belgium	Museum Plantin-Moretus, Antwerp 51°13′06″N 4°23′52″E	2001	
Archives Insolvente Boedelskamer Antwerpen	Belgium	Municipal Archives Antwerp, Antwerp 51°13′39″N 4°24′28″E	2009	
The Archives of the University of Leuven (1425-1797)	Belgium	State Archives, Leuven 50°52′52″N 4°42′07″E; University Archives and Art Collections, KU Leuven 50°52′41″N 4°42′27″E	2013	
Universal Bibliographic Repertory	Belgium	Mundaneum 50°27′27″N 3°57′23″E	2013	
The archives, engravings and manuscripts used by the Bollandists (17th-18th centuries)	Belgium	Society of Bollandists, Brussels	2025	
Manuscript collection of the Gazi Husrev-beg Library	Bosnia and Herzegovina	Gazi Husrev-beg Library 43°51′35″N 18°25′42″E	2017	
The Sarajevo Haggadah manuscript	Bosnia and Herzegovina	National Museum of Bosnia and Herzegovina 43°51′18″N 18°24′09″E	2017	
Enina Apostolos, a Cyrillic manuscript fragment of the 11th century in Old Bulgarian language	Bulgaria	SS. Cyril and Methodius National Library, Sofia 42°41′42″N 23°20′09″E	2011	
Boril's Synodicon	Bulgaria	SS. Cyril and Methodius National Library, Sofia 42°41′42″N 23°20′09″E	2017	
Gospels of Tsar Ivan Alexander	Bulgaria, United Kingdom	SS. Cyril and Methodius National Library, Sofia 42°41′42″N 23°20′09″E	2017	
Hudson's Bay Company Archival records	Canada	Archives of Manitoba, Winnipeg 49°53′19″N 97°08′55″W	2007	
Quebec Seminary Collection, 1623-1800 (17th-19th centuries)	Canada	Musée de la civilisation, Quebec City 46°48′55″N 71°12′08″W	2007	
Neighbours, animated, directed and produced by Norman McLaren in 1952	Canada	National Film Board of Canada, Montréal 45°30′25″N 73°34′06″W	2009	
The Discovery of Insulin and its Worldwide Impact	Canada	Thomas Fisher Rare Book Library 43°39′51″N 79°23′56″W	2013	
Marshall McLuhan: The Archives of the Future	Canada	Library and Archives Canada 45°29′05″N 75°40′46″W; Thomas Fisher Rare Book Library 43°39′51″N 79°23′56″W	2017	
Mixed Traces and Memories of the continents - The Sound of the French people of America	Canada	Cinémathèque québécoise 45°30′50″N 73°33′45″W	2017	
Philosophical Nachlass of Ludwig Wittgenstein	Canada, Austria, Netherlands, United Kingdom	Trinity College Library, Cambridge 52°12′25″N 0°06′53″E; Bodleian Library, University of Oxford 51°45′15″N 1°15′15″W; North Holland Archives 52°22′59″N 4°38′17″E; Bertrand Russell Archives, McMaster University Library, Hamilton 43°15′45″N 79°54′56″W	2017	
The Children Speak: Forced Assimilation of Indigenous Children through Canadian Residential Schools	Canada	National Centre for Truth and Reconciliation, Manitoba 49°48′42″N 97°07′59″W	2023	
Providing care in the New World: the Augustinian sisters of Canada, women of heart and commitment	Canada	Fiducie du patrimoine culturel des Augustines 46°48′55″N 71°12′39″W	2023	
The Notman Photographic Archives: An Exceptional Record of a Nineteenth-Century Studio	Canada	McCord Stewart Museum, Montreal	2025	
John Peters Humphrey - the Archives of an International Human Rights Career	Canada	McGill University Archives, Quebec	2025	
Archives of the Republic of Dubrovnik (1022-1808)	Croatia	Dubrovnik Archive 42°38′28″N 18°06′39″E	2023	
Short films of the Zagreb School of Animated Films (1956 – 1979)	Croatia	Zagreb Film, Zagreb; Croatian State Archives, Zagreb	2025	
Andrija Štampar’s diaries (1931-1938)	Croatia	Croatian State Archives, Zagreb	2025	
Collection of medieval manuscripts of the Czech Reformation	Czech Republic	National Library of the Czech Republic, Prague 50°05′11″N 14°24′57″E	2007	
Collection of Russian, Ukrainian and Belorussian émigré periodicals 1918-1945	Czech Republic	National Library of the Czech Republic, Prague 50°05′11″N 14°24′57″E	2007	
Collection of 526 prints of university theses from 1637 to 1754	Czech Republic	National Library of the Czech Republic, Prague 50°05′11″N 14°24′57″E	2011	
Libri Prohibiti: Collection of periodicals of Czech and Slovak Samizdat in the years 1948-1989	Czech Republic	Libri Prohibiti Library 50°05′09″N 14°25′47″E	2013	
Archives of Leoš Janáček	Czech Republic	Department of the History of Music, Moravian Museum 49°11′31″N 16°36′31″E	2017	
Camocio Maps	Czech Republic, Malta	Faculty of Science, Charles University, Prague 50°04′08″N 14°25′28″E; Heritage Malta 35°53′34″N 14°31′29″E	2017	
The Kynzvart Daguerreotype – The Birth of Modern Visual Media	Czech Republic	National Heritage Institute 50°05′25″N 14°24′18″E	2017	
Moll's collection	Czech Republic	Moravian Library 49°12′31″N 16°35′39″E	2023	
The Archives of Antonín Dvořák	Czech Republic	Antonín Dvořák Museum 50°04′25″N 14°25′37″E	2023	
Situation plans of towns and villages of Jewish settlement in the Habsburg Empire	Czech Republic	National Archives, Prague; Regional Archives in Opava; Šumperk Museum of Natural History; Moravian Regional Archive in Brno; Archdiocese of Olomouc; State Regional Archives Litoměřice; Regional State Archives in Třeboň; Kojetín Municipal Cultural Centre, Kojetin	2025	
Collection of cartographic documents by Pavel Josef Šafařík	Czech Republic	Charles University, Prague	2025	
Drawings and writings of children during wartime in Europe: 1914-1950	Czech Republic, Germany, United Kingdom, France, Switzerland, Poland, Spain, Canada	Musée national de l'Éducation, Rouen; IRAND. International Research and Archives Network Historical Children’s and Youth Drawings: multiple locations across Europe	2025	
The Linné Collection	Denmark	Danish National Library of Sciences and Medicine, Copenhagen 55°41′50″N 12°33′39″E	1997	
Manuscripts and correspondence of Hans Christian Andersen	Denmark	Royal Library, Copenhagen 55°40′24″N 12°34′58″E	1997	
The Søren Kierkegaard Archives	Denmark	Royal Library, Copenhagen 55°40′24″N 12°34′58″E	1997	
Archives of the Danish overseas trading companies	Denmark	Danish National Archives, Copenhagen 55°40′24″N 12°34′58″E	1997	
El Primer Nueva Coronica y Buen Gobierno	Denmark	Royal Library, Copenhagen 55°40′24″N 12°34′58″E	2007	
Sound Toll Registers	Denmark	Danish National Archives, Copenhagen 55°40′24″N 12°34′58″E	2007	
MS. GKS 4 2°, vol. I-III, Biblia Latina. Commonly called "the Hamburg Bible", or "the Bible of Bertoldus"	Denmark	Royal Library, Copenhagen 55°40′24″N 12°34′58″E	2011	
The Arnamagnæan Manuscript Collection	Denmark, Iceland	Arnamagnæan Institute, Dept. of Scandinavian Research, University of Copenhagen 55°39′46″N 12°35′33″E; Árni Magnússon Institute for Icelandic Studies, Reykjavík 64°08′46″N 21°55′50″W	2009	
The Baltic Way - Human Chain Linking Three States in their Drive for Freedom	Estonia, Latvia, Lithuania	National Archives of Estonia 58°21′57″N 26°41′33″E; Museum of the Popular Front of Latvia 56°56′47″N 24°06′42″E; Lithuanian Central State Archive 54°43′41″N 25°19′18″E	2009	
The A.E. Nordenskiöld Collection	Finland	University Library, Helsinki 60°10′17″N 24°56′56″E	1997	
Archive of the Skolt Sámi village of Suonjel Suenjel	Finland	The Sámi Archives 68°54′28″N 27°00′45″E	2015	
Gustaf Erikson Shipping Company archives in the Åland Islands from the era of the last Windjammers in global trade 1913-1949	Finland	Provincial Archives of Åland 60°05′53″N 19°56′42″E; Åland Maritime Museum Trust 60°05′51″N 19°55′35″E	2023	
Edvard Westermarck’s Archives at Åbo Akademi University Library	Finland	Åbo Akademi University Library	2025	
Original Declaration of the Rights of Man and of the Citizen (1789–1791)	France	National Library of France, Paris 48°50′01″N 2°22′33″E	2003	
Introduction of the decimal metric system, 1790–1837	France	National Historical Archives Centre, Paris 48°51′36″N 2°21′26″E	2005	
Lumière Films	France	Archives Françaises du Film 48°48′18″N 2°02′03″E	2005	
Bayeux Tapestry	France	Bayeux Museum, Bayeux 49°16′28″N 0°42′00″W	2007	
Library of the Cistercian Abbey of Clairvaux at the time of Pierre de Virey (1472)	France	Médiathèque de l’Agglomération Troyenne 48°18′03″N 4°04′22″E; Bibliothèque Interuniversitaire de Montpellier 43°36′17″N 3°53′55″E; National Library of France, Paris 48°50′01″N 2°22′33″E; Bibliothèque municipale de Lyon 49°33′45″N 3°36′42″E; Bibliothèque Sainte Geneviève 48°50′50″N 2°20′46″E; Laurentian Library, Florence 43°46′28″N 11°15′12″E; Université de Mons-Hainaut, Bibliothèque centrale 50°27′17″N 3°57′00″E; British Library 51°31′46″N 0°07′41″W; National Széchényi Library, Budapest 47°29′43″N 19°02′22″E	2009	
The Beatus Rhenanus Library	France	Humanist Library, Sélestat 48°15′37″N 7°27′18″E	2011	
Bannière Register at Chatelet, Paris, during the reign of François I (National Archives Y9, France)	France	National Historical Archives Centre, Paris 48°51′36″N 2°21′26″E	2011	
Louis Pasteur's Archive	France	National Library of France, Paris 48°50′01″N 2°22′33″E; Academy of Sciences 48°51′27″N 2°20′14″E	2015	
The Mappa mundi of Albi	France	Médiathèque d'Albi Pierre-Amalric 43°55′25″N 2°08′34″E	2015	
Humanity's First Recordings of its Own Voice: The Phonautograms of Édouard-Léon Scott de Martinville (c.1853-1860)	France	French Academy of Sciences 48°51′26″N 2°20′13″E; National Industrial Property Institute 48°54′17″N 2°15′44″E; Bibliothèque de l’Institut de France 48°51′22″N 2°20′01″E; Société d’encouragement pour l’industrie nationale 48°51′16″N 2°19′52″E	2015	
The Appeal of 18 June 1940	France, United Kingdom	Institut National de l’Audiovisuel 48°50′11″N 2°31′48″E; British Broadcasting Corporation 51°31′07″N 0°08′36″W; Sénat, Paris 48°50′57″N 2°20′15″E; Musée de l’Ordre de la Libération 48°51′18″N 2°18′39″E	2005	
The moving picture shows of Émile Reynaud	France, Czech Republic	Institut national de la propriété industrielle 48°54′16″N 2°15′43″E; Conservatoire national des Arts et métiers 48°52′01″N 2°21′19″E; Centre national du cinéma et de l’image animée 48°50′08″N 2°19′56″E; Cinémathèque Française 48°50′14″N 2°22′57″E; National Technical Museum, Prague 50°05′50″N 14°25′30″E	2015	
Archives of Père Castor	France	Community of Briance, Sud Haute-Vienne 45°41′44″N 1°21′29″E	2017	
Shoah by Claude Lanzmann, restored 35 mm negative; Audio Archive Witnesses to the History of Shoah, 200 hours	France, Germany	Les films ALEPH SARL, Paris 48°51′49″N 2°20′52″E; Jewish Museum Berlin 52°30′08″N 13°23′43″E	2023	
Archives of the International Movement ATD Fourth World in France and Burkina Faso from 1957 to 1992	France	Centre Joseph Wresinski, Baillet-en-France 49°03′55″N 2°18′05″E; ATD Fourth World Burkina Faso 12°22′38″N 1°30′58″W	2023	
Archives of the International Solvay Conferences on Physics and Chemistry (1910-1962)	France, Belgium	Département des Bibliothèques et de l’Information Scientifique, Université libre de Bruxelles 50°48′50″N 4°22′56″E; École Supérieure de Chimie et Physique de la Ville de Paris 48°50′29″N 2°20′51″E	2023	
Registers identifying enslaved persons in the former French colonies (1666-1880)	Haiti, France, Guyana	National Archives of Haiti, Port-au-Prince 18°32′17″N 72°17′25″W; Archives nationales d'outre-mer, Aix-en-Provence 43°30′53″N 5°26′50″E; Archives departementales de la Guadeloupe, Gourbeyre 15°59′15″N 61°42′42″W; Maison des cultures et des memoires de Guyane, Remire-Montjoly, Guyana 4°54′13″N 52°16′32″W; Archives territoriales de Martinique, Fort-de-France 14°36′24″N 61°04′48″W; Archives departementales de la Réunion, Sainte-Clotilde 20°51′54″S 55°27′36″E	2023	
Apocalypse Tapestry of Angers	France	Direction Régionale des Affaires Culturelles des Pays de la Loire, Nantes 47°13′18″N 1°32′38″W	2023	
Bordeaux Copy: Montaigne’s Essays annotated (1588-1592) by the author	France	Bordeaux municipal library 44°50′07″N 0°35′11″W	2023	
Archives of the expedition of d’Entrecasteaux (1791-1794)	France, Australia	Archives nationales; Musée du quai Branly; Muséum national d'histoire naturelle; National Library of Australia	2025	
The Archives of the Planet (1909-1932)	France	Musée Albert-Kahn, Boulogne-Billancourt	2025	
The Archives of the Spoken Word (1911-1953): memory of the human voice	France	National Library of France, Paris 48°50′01″N 2°22′33″E	2025	
The Treaty of Perpetual Peace of Friborg (1516)	France, Switzerland	Archives nationales; Fribourg State Archives	2025	
Description of Georgian Kingdom and the Geographical Atlas of Vakhushti Bagrationi	Georgia	National Archives of Georgia 41°43′41″N 44°46′04″E	2013	
Georgian Byzantine Manuscripts	Georgia	Georgian National Centre of Manuscripts, Tbilisi 41°43′03″N 44°46′59″E	2011	
Manuscript Collection of Shota Rustaveli's Poem "Knight in the Panther's Skin"	Georgia, United Kingdom	Georgian National Centre of Manuscripts, Tbilisi 41°43′03″N 44°46′59″E	2013	
The Oldest Manuscripts Preserved at the National Archives of Georgia	Georgia	National Archives of Georgia 41°43′41″N 44°46′04″E	2015	
The Tetraevangelion-palimpsest	Georgia	National Archives of Georgia 41°43′41″N 44°46′04″E	2017	
Early cylinder recordings of the world's musical traditions (1893–1952) in the Berlin Phonogramm-Archiv	Germany	Museum of Ethnology, Berlin 52°27′21″N 13°17′37″E	1999	
Ludwig van Beethoven - Symphony n°9, d-minor, op.125	Germany	State Library, Berlin 52°31′03″N 13°23′30″E	2001	
The literary estate of Goethe in the Goethe and Schiller Archives	Germany	Goethe and Schiller Archives, Weimar 50°58′59″N 11°20′02″E	2001	
42-line Gutenberg Bible, printed on vellum, and its contemporary documentary background	Germany	Göttingen State and University Library, Göttingen 51°32′21″N 9°56′10″E	2001	
Metropolis -Sicherungsstück Nr. 1: Negative of the restored and reconstructed version 2001	Germany	Friedrich Wilhelm Murnau Foundation, Wiesbaden 50°03′58″N 8°14′57″E	2001	
Illuminated manuscripts from the Ottonian period produced in the monastery of Reichenau (Lake Constance)	Germany	Bavarian State Library 48°08′51″N 11°34′49″E	2003	
Kinder-und Hausmärchen (Children's and Household Tales)	Germany	Brother Grimm's Museum, Kassel 51°18′35″N 9°29′38″E	2005	
Letters from and to Gottfried Wilhelm Leibniz within the collection of manuscript papers of Gottfried Wilhelm Leibniz	Germany	Gottfried Wilhelm Leibniz Library, Hanover 52°21′55″N 9°43′51″E	2007	
Song of the Nibelungs, a heroic poem from mediaeval Europe	Germany	Bavarian State Library 48°08′51″N 11°34′49″E; Abbey Archives and the Abbey Library of Saint Gallen 47°25′25″N 9°22′42″E; Regional Library of the State of Baden, Karlsruhe 49°00′29″N 8°23′58″E	2009	
Patent DRP 37435 "Vehicle with gas engine operation" submitted by Carl Benz, 1886	Germany	Landesmuseum für Technik und Arbeit in Mannheim 49°28′34″N 8°29′51″E	2011	
Construction and Fall of the Berlin Wall and the Two-Plus-Four-Treaty of 1990	Germany	State Archive of Hamburg 53°34′30″N 10°04′08″E	2011	
Lorsch Pharmacopoeia (The Bamberg State Library, Msc.Med.1)	Germany	Bamberg State Library 49°53′31″N 10°52′56″E	2013	
Manifest der Kommunistischen Partei, draft manuscript page and Das Kapital. Erster Band, Karl Marx's personal annotated copy	Germany, Netherlands	International Institute of Social History, Amsterdam 52°22′08″N 4°56′21″E	2013	
Nebra sky disc, the oldest concrete depiction of astronomical phenomena known from anywhere in the world.	Germany	Halle State Museum of Prehistory 51°29′53″N 11°57′45″E	2013	
The "Golden Bull" – All seven originals and the "King Wenceslaus' luxury manuscript copy" of the Österreichische Nationalbibliothek	Germany, Austria	Austrian National Library, Vienna 48°12′22″N 16°22′00″E; Austrian State Archives, Vienna 48°11′30″N 16°24′45″E; Landesarchiv Baden-Württemberg 48°46′36″N 9°11′04″E; Bayerisches Hauptstaatsarchiv 48°08′46″N 11°34′51″E; Staatsarchiv Nürnberg 49°27′46″N 11°04′28″E; Universitäts- und Landesbibliothek Darmstadt 49°52′35″N 8°39′27″E; Institut für Stadtgeschichte (Stadtarchiv) 50°06′34″N 8°40′40″E	2013	
Archives of the International Tracing Service	Germany	Archives of the International Tracing Service, Bad Arolsen 51°22′41″N 9°01′09″E	2013	
Documents representing the beginning and the early development of the Reformation initiated by Martin Luther	Germany	Herzog August Bibliothek Wolfenbüttel 52°09′52″N 10°31′49″E; Sächsische Landesbibliothek - Staats- und Universitätsbibliothek 51°01′43″N 13°44′13″E; Anhaltische Landesbücherei Dessau 51°50′08″N 12°14′50″E; Forschungsbibliothek Gotha 50°56′45″N 10°42′17″E; Thüringisches Hauptstaatsarchiv Weimar 50°58′34″N 11°19′49″E; Lutherhaus Wittenberg 51°51′50″N 12°39′09″E; Universitätsbibliothek Heidelberg 49°24′35″N 8°42′22″E; Stadtbibliothek Worms 49°37′47″N 8°21′42″E; Thüringer Universitäts- und Landesbibliothek Jena 50°55′50″N 11°35′16″E; State Library, Berlin 52°31′03″N 13°23′30″E	2015	
Autograph of h-Moll-Messe (Mass in B minor) by Johann Sebastian Bach	Germany	State Library, Berlin 52°31′03″N 13°23′30″E	2015	
The Golden Letter of the Burmese King Alaungphaya to King George II of Great Britain	Germany, United Kingdom, Myanmar	Department of Archaeology and National Museum, Naypyidaw 19°47′20″N 96°08′29″E; Gottfried Wilhelm Leibniz Library – State Library of Lower Saxony 52°21′55″N 9°43′51″E	2015	
Al-Masaalik Wa Al-Mamaalik	Germany, Iran	The National Library and Archives of Iran, Tehran 35°45′07″N 51°26′03″E; The Gotha Research Library, Erfurt 50°56′43″N 10°42′20″E	2015	
Frankfurt Auschwitz Trial	Germany	Hessisches Hauptstaatsarchiv 50°03′48″N 8°14′22″E	2017	
Constitutio Antoniniana	Germany	Universitätsbibliothek Giessen 50°34′34″N 8°41′44″E	2017	
Behaim Globe	Germany	Germanisches Nationalmuseum 49°26′54″N 11°04′32″E	2023	
Codex Manesse (Heidelberg University Library, Cod. Pal. germ. 848)	Germany	Heidelberg University Library 49°24′35″N 8°42′21″E	2023	
The Literary Estate of Friedrich Nietzsche	Germany, Switzerland	Klassik Stiftung Weimar; Basel University Library	2025	
Mawlana’s Kulliyat (The Complete Works of Mawlana)	Iran, Tajikistan, Germany, Bulgaria, Uzbekistan, Turkey	SS. Cyril and Methodius National Library, Sofia 42°41′41″N 23°20′10″E; State Library, Berlin 52°31′03″N 13°23′30″E; Bavarian State Library 48°08′51″N 11°34′49″E; Iranian National Committee for the Memory of the World; The National Library and Archives of Iran 35°45′07″N 51°26′03″E; Golestan Palace Library, Tehran 35°40′47″N 51°25′14″E; Written Heritage Research Institute (Mīrās-e Maktoob), Tehran 35°42′06″N 51°23′56″E; Centre of the Written Heritage of the National Academy of Sciences of Tajikistan, Dushanbe 38°34′08″N 68°47′27″E; Turkish National Commission for UNESCO, National Memory of the World Committee; Al-Biruni Institute of Oriental Studies, Academy of Sciences of the Republic of Uzbekistan 41°18′24″N 69°17′12″E	2023	
Documents on the history of the Hanse	Germany, Belgium, Estonia, Latvia, Poland	Archive of the Hanseatic City of Lübeck 53°51′38″N 10°41′06″E; City Archives of Braunschweig 52°15′50″N 10°31′40″E; State Archives of Bremen 53°04′38″N 8°48′58″E; Bruges City Archives 51°12′31″N 3°14′01″E; State Archives of Hamburg 53°34′30″N 10°04′08″E; Historical Archive of the City of Cologne 50°55′51″N 6°57′26″E; The Royal Danish Library 55°40′26″N 12°34′56″E; Latvian State Historical Archives 56°56′49″N 24°04′26″E; City Archives of the Hanseatic City of Stralsund 54°18′33″N 13°04′55″E; City Archives of Tallinn 59°26′31″N 24°44′53″E; State Archives of Toruń 53°00′41″N 18°36′06″E	2023	
The illuminated manuscripts of Charlemagne's Court School	Germany	Municipal Library of Trier 49°45′05″N 6°38′29″E	2023	
Representative radiographs from the Wilhelm Conrad Roentgen estate	Germany	German Röntgen Museum, Remscheid	2025	
The Munich Manuscript of the Babylonian Talmud	Germany	Bavarian State Library, Munich	2025	
The Derveni Papyrus: The oldest 'book' of Europe	Greece	Archaeological Museum of Thessaloniki 40°37′31″N 22°57′14″E	2015	
The lead tablets of the Dodona Oracle	Greece	Archaeological Museum of Ioannina 39°40′00″N 20°51′22″E	2023	
Kálmán Tihanyi's 1926 Patent Application "Radioskop"	Hungary	National Archives of Hungary, Budapest 47°30′17″N 19°01′49″E	2001	
Tabula Hungariae	Hungary, Croatia	National Széchényi Library, Budapest 47°29′43″N 19°02′22″E	2007	
János Bolyai: Appendix, scientiam spatii absolute veram exhibens. Maros-Vásárhelyini, 1832	Hungary	Library of the Hungarian Academy of Sciences, Budapest 47°30′06″N 19°02′47″E	2009	
The Csoma Archive of the Library of the Hungarian Academy of Science	Hungary	Library of the Hungarian Academy of Sciences, Budapest 47°30′06″N 19°02′47″E	2009	
Semmelweis' discovery	Hungary	Semmelweis Museum, Library and Archives of the History of Medicine 47°29′36″N 19°02′35″E	2013	
Three documents related to the two most outstanding results of the work of Roland Eötvös	Hungary	Library of the Hungarian Academy of Sciences, Budapest 47°30′06″N 19°02′47″E	2015	
1703 Census of Iceland	Iceland	National Archives of Iceland 64°08′32″N 21°54′27″W	2013	
Book of Kells	Ireland	Trinity College Library 53°20′38″N 6°15′24″W	2011	
The Irish Folklore Commission Collection 1935-1970	Ireland	National Folklore Collection, Newman Building, University College Dublin 53°18′21″N 6°13′18″W	2017	
Pages of Testimony Collection, Yad Vashem Jerusalem, 1954-2004	Israel	Yad Vashem 31°46′28″N 35°10′30″E	2013	
Rothschild Miscellany	Israel	The Israel Museum, Jerusalem 31°46′19″N 35°12′15″E	2013	
Aleppo Codex	Israel	The Israel Museum, Jerusalem 31°46′19″N 35°12′15″E	2015	
The Papers of Sir Isaac Newton	Israel	The National Library of Israel 31°46′34″N 35°11′48″E	2015	
Israel Folktale Archives	Israel	Department of Hebrew and Comparative Literature, The University of Haifa 32°45′47″N 35°01′04″E	2017	
The Malatesta Novello Library	Italy	Malatesta Novello Library, Cesena 44°08′20″N 12°14′38″E	2005	
Lucca's Historical Diocesan Archives (ASDLU): Early Middle Ages	Italy	Historical Diocesan Archive, Lucca 43°50′27″N 10°30′26″E	2011	
Newsreels and photographs of Istituto Nazionale L.U.C.E.	Italy	Istituto Luce, Rome 41°50′59″N 12°34′28″E	2013	
The Collection of Barbanera Almanacs (1762-1962)	Italy	Fondazione Barbanera 1762, Spello 42°58′54″N 12°40′10″E	2015	
The Work of Fray Bernardino de Sahagún	Italy, Mexico, Spain	Real Biblioteca de Madrid 40°25′05″N 3°42′51″W; Real Academia de la Historia 40°24′49″N 3°41′56″W; Biblioteca Medicea Laurenziana 43°46′28″N 11°15′15″E	2015	
The Codex purpureus Rossanensis	Italy	Diocesan Museum, Rossano 39°34′30″N 16°38′08″E	2015	
Antônio Carlos Gomes: composer of two worlds	Italy, Brazil	Arquivo Nacional (AN) - Ministério da Justiça 22°54′23″S 43°11′27″W; Escola de Música da Universidade Federal do Rio de Janeiro 22°54′49″S 43°10′41″W; Fundação Biblioteca Nacional 22°54′35″S 43°10′31″W; Museu Histórico Nacional 22°54′21″S 43°10′10″W; Museu Imperial 22°30′29″S 43°10′31″W; Museu da Universidade Federal do Pará 1°27′01″S 48°28′59″W	2017	
Apodissary fund of the ancient Neapolitan public banks (1573-1809)	Italy	Banco di Napoli Foundation 40°51′10″N 14°15′47″E	2023	
Criminal Proceedings of the Vajont dam disaster	Italy	State Archives of L'Aquila 42°20′30″N 13°27′40″E	2023	
Luigi Sturzo Archives (1890-1959)	Italy	Luigi Sturzo Institute, Rome	2025	
Architecture and archaeological excavations in the State Archives of Naples (1712-1955)	Italy	State Archives of Naples	2025	
Collection of manuscripts of Khoja Ahmed Yasawi	Kazakhstan	National Library of the Republic of Kazakhstan, Almaty 43°14′29″N 76°56′35″E	2003	
Audiovisual documents of the International antinuclear movement "Nevada-Semipalatinsk"	Kazakhstan	Central State Archives of the Republic of Kazakhstan, Almaty 43°14′34″N 76°56′44″E	2005	
Aral Sea Archival Fonds	Kazakhstan	Central State Archives of the Republic of Kazakhstan, Almaty 43°14′34″N 76°56′44″E	2011	
Manuscript “Chronicle of Khans”	Kazakhstan	Ministry of Science and Higher Education of the Republic of Kazakhstan, Almaty	2025	
Dainu skapis – Cabinet of Folksongs	Latvia	National Library of Latvia, Riga 56°56′28″N 24°05′48″E	2001	
The Family of Man	Luxembourg	Clervaux Museum, Clervaux 50°03′16″N 6°01′49″E	2003	
Petrus de Caxaro’s Kantilena	Malta	National Archives of Malta, Rabat 35°52′55″N 14°24′05″E	2025	
Library Ets Haim – Livraria Montezinos	Netherlands	Portuguese-Jewish Seminary Ets Haim, Amsterdam 52°22′04″N 4°54′17″E	2003	
Archives of the Dutch East India Company	Netherlands, India, Indonesia, South Africa, Sri Lanka	Cape Town Archives Repository (office of the National Archives of South Africa) 33°55′53″S 18°25′26″E; Tamil Nadu Archives 13°04′35″N 80°15′38″E; Department of National Archives of Sri Lanka 6°54′24″N 79°51′53″E; Arsip Nasional Republik Indonesia (National Archives of Indonesia) 6°16′43″S 106°49′08″E; Nationaal Archief (National Archives of the Netherlands) 52°04′52″N 4°19′35″E	2003	
Diaries of Anne Frank	Netherlands	Anne Frank House, Amsterdam 52°22′31″N 4°53′02″E	2009	
Desmet Collection	Netherlands	EYE Film Instituut 52°23′04″N 4°54′03″E	2011	
La Galigo	Netherlands, Indonesia	Fort Rotterdam, Makassar 5°08′02″S 119°24′19″E; Leiden University Library, Leiden 52°09′26″N 4°28′53″E	2011	
Archive Middelburgsche Commercie Compagnie (MCC)	Netherlands, Curacao, Suriname	Zeeuws Archief 51°30′05″N 3°36′45″E	2011	
Dutch West India Company (Westindische Compagnie) archives	Netherlands, United Kingdom, United States, Ghana, Brazil, Guyana, Netherlands Antilles, Suriname	Albany County Hall of Records, Albany, New York 42°39′58″N 73°44′51″W; Archivo Nashonal (National archives of the Netherlands Antilles) 12°06′14″N 68°55′26″W; National Archives of Brazil 22°54′23″S 43°11′26″W; Municipal Archives New York 40°42′49″N 74°00′16″W; Nationaal Archief 52°04′52″N 4°19′35″E; Nationaal Archief Surinamee 5°48′39″N 55°12′42″W; The National Archives-Kew 51°28′53″N 0°16′48″W; New York State Archives 42°38′54″N 73°45′42″W; National Archives of Guyana 6°48′10″N 58°08′26″W	2011	
Babad Diponegoro or Autobiographical Chronicle of Prince Diponegoro (1785-1855). A Javanese nobleman, Indonesian national hero and pan-Islamist	Netherlands, Indonesia	National Library of Indonesia, Jakarta 6°10′53″S 106°49′37″E; Royal Netherlands Institute of Southeast Asian and Caribbean Studies 52°09′31″N 4°28′57″E	2013	
Selected data collections of the world's language diversity at the Language Archive	Netherlands	The Language Archive of the Max-Planck-Institute for Psycholinguistics 51°49′05″N 5°51′26″E	2015	
Utrecht Psalter	Netherlands	Utrecht University 52°05′07″N 5°10′32″E	2015	
The Archive of the Amsterdam Notaries 1578-1915	Netherlands	Amsterdam City Archives 52°21′53″N 4°53′33″E	2017	
Westerbork films	Netherlands	Netherlands Institute for Sound and Vision 52°14′08″N 5°10′23″E	2017	
Aletta H. Jacobs Papers	Netherlands, United States	Atria, Institute on Gender Equality and Women's History 52°21′57″N 4°53′34″E	2017	
Panji Tales Manuscripts	Indonesia, Cambodia, Netherlands, Malaysia, United Kingdom	Leiden University Library, Leiden 52°09′26″N 4°28′53″E; National Library of Indonesia 6°10′53″S 106°49′37″E; National Library of Malaysia 3°10′14″N 101°42′41″E; National Library of Cambodia 11°34′35″N 104°55′10″E	2017	
Erasmus Collection Rotterdam	Netherlands	Rotterdam Public Library 51°55′16″N 4°29′21″E	2023	
Documentary heritage of the enslaved people of the Dutch Caribbean and their descendants (1816-1969)	Netherlands, Curaçao, Sint Maarten, Suriname	Nationaal Archief (National Archives of the Netherlands) 52°04′52″N 4°19′35″E; National Archives of Suriname 5°48′39″N 55°12′42″W; National Archive of Curaçao 12°06′14″N 68°55′25″W; National Archaeological and Anthropological Memory Management Foundation, Curaçao 12°06′09″N 68°55′36″W; Department of Records and Information Management, Government of St. Maarten 18°01′30″N 63°02′42″W	2023	
DDS: De Digitale Stad / The Digital City	Netherlands	DDS Heritage Foundation 52°22′22″N 4°54′01″E; Amsterdam Museum 52°22′13″N 4°53′27″E; Netherlands Institute for Sound and Vision 52°14′08″N 5°10′23″E; KB National Library of the Netherlands 52°04′54″N 4°19′39″E	2023	
The Hikayat Aceh - Three manuscripts on life in Aceh, Indonesia, in the 15th-17th century	Netherlands, Indonesia	National Library of Indonesia, Jakarta 6°10′53″S 106°49′37″E; Leiden University Library 52°09′26″N 4°28′53″E	2023	
First Catechism Written in Papiamentu Language	Netherlands Antilles	National Archives of the Netherlands Antilles, Willemstad 12°06′14″N 68°55′26″W	2009	
Kartini Letters and Archive: the struggle for gender equality	Netherlands, Indonesia	National Archives of Indonesia, Jakarta; Royal Institute of Southeast Asian and Caribbean Studies, Leiden; Nationaal Archief, The Hague	2025	
Documentary heritage of the enslaved people of the Dutch Caribbean and their descendants (1816-1969) - Aruba	Netherlands	National Library of Aruba, Oranjestad; National Archives of Aruba, Oranjestad	2025	
Documentary heritage of the enslaved people of the Dutch Caribbean and their descendants (1816-1969) - Curaçao	Netherlands	National archive of Curaçao, Willemstad	2025	
Archives of the Deltadienst	Netherlands	Zeeland Archives, Middelburg	2025	
The Leprosy Archives of Bergen	Norway	City Archives and Regional State Archives of Bergen, Bergen 60°22′51″N 5°21′36″E	2001	
Henrik Ibsen: A Doll's House	Norway	National Library of Norway, Oslo 59°54′51″N 10°43′03″E	2001	
Roald Amundsen's South Pole Expedition (1910–1912)	Norway	Norwegian Film Institute 59°54′35″N 10°44′45″E; National Library of Norway, Oslo 59°54′51″N 10°43′03″E	2005	
Thor Heyerdahl's Archives (1914–2002)	Norway	Kon-Tiki Museum, Oslo 59°54′13″N 10°41′53″E; National Library of Norway, Oslo 59°54′51″N 10°43′03″E	2005	
Sophus Tromholt Collection	Norway	Bergen University Library 60°23′16″N 5°19′12″E	2013	
The Castbergian Child Laws of 1915	Norway	Archives of the Storting 59°54′47″N 10°44′24″E	2017	
Autograph of Nicolaus Copernicus' masterpiece De Revolutionibus Orbium Coelestium	Poland	Jagiellonian University, Kraków 50°03′40″N 19°56′03″E	1999	
Warsaw Ghetto Archives (Emanuel Ringelblum Archives)	Poland	Jewish Historical Research Institute, Warsaw 52°14′40″N 21°00′10″E	1999	
The Masterpieces of Fryderyk Chopin	Poland	The Fryderyk Chopin Society, Warsaw 52°14′12″N 21°01′22″E	1999	
The Confederation of Warsaw of 28 January 1573: Religious tolerance guaranteed	Poland	The Central Archives of Historical Records, Warsaw 52°15′00″N 21°00′30″E	2003	
Twenty-One Demands, Gdańsk, August 1980: The birth of the Solidarity trade union – a massive social movement	Poland	The Polish Maritime Museum, Gdańsk 54°21′03″N 18°39′32″E	2003	
National Education Commission Archives	Poland	Jagiellonian University Archives, Kraków 50°03′41″N 19°55′19″E; Central Archives of Historical Records, Warsaw 52°15′00″N 21°00′30″E; Czartoryski Library, Kraków 50°03′50″N 19°56′23″E; Polish Academy of Arts and Sciences, Kraków 50°03′52″N 19°56′18″E	2007	
Archives of the Literary Institute in Paris (1946–2000)	Poland	Association Institut Littéraire "Kultura", Paris 48°56′36″N 2°07′50″E	2009	
Codex Suprasliensis – Mineia četia, Mart (The Supraśl Codex – Menology, March)	Poland, Russia, Slovenia	National Library of Poland 52°12′49″N 21°00′13″E; National and University Library of Slovenia, Ljubljana 46°02′51″N 14°30′14″E; Russian National Library, Saint Petersburg 59°56′01″N 30°20′09″E	2007	
Archive of Warsaw Reconstruction Office	Poland	State Archives of the Capital City of Warsaw 52°15′02″N 21°00′40″E	2011	
Collections of the 19th century of the Polish Historical and Literary Society / Polish Library in Paris / Adam Mickiewicz Museum	Poland	Association de la Bibliothèque Polonaise de Paris 48°51′05″N 2°21′20″E	2013	
Peace treaties (ahdnames) concluded from the mid-15th century to late-18th century between the Kingdom (or Republic) of Poland and the Ottoman Empire	Poland	The Central Archives of Historical Records, Warsaw 52°15′00″N 21°00′30″E	2013	
The Book of Henryków	Poland	Kuria Metropolitalna Wrocławska 51°06′51″N 17°02′41″E	2015	
Files and library of the Unity of the Brethren	Poland	State Archive in Poznań 52°24′35″N 16°55′55″E; Raczyński Library in Poznań 52°24′30″N 16°55′43″E; Kórnik Library of Polish Academy of Sciences 52°14′38″N 17°05′27″E	2015	
Documents of Polish radio intelligence from the period of the Battle of Warsaw in 1920	Poland	Central Military Archives of Poland 52°15′50″N 21°10′28″E	2017	
Jürgen Stroop's Report	Poland	Institute of National Remembrance – Commission for the Prosecution of Crimes against the Polish Nation 52°10′56″N 21°00′03″E	2017	
The Act of the Union of Lublin document	Poland, Lithuania, Ukraine, Belarus, Latvia	Central Archives of Historical Records, Warsaw 52°15′00″N 21°00′30″E	2017	
Letter from Pero Vaz de Caminha	Portugal	National Archives, Lisbon 38°45′17″N 9°09′23″W	2005	
Corpo Cronológico (Collection of Manuscripts on the Portuguese Discoveries)	Portugal	Institute of National Archives, Lisbon 38°45′17″N 9°09′23″W	2007	
First flight across the South Atlantic Ocean in 1922	Portugal	Arquivo Histórico da Marinha – Biblioteca Central da Marinha, Belém, Lisbon 38°41′53″N 9°11′23″W	2011	
Arquivos dos Dembos / Ndembu Archives	Portugal, Angola	Arquivo Nacional de Angola, Luanda 8°49′04″S 13°13′52″E	2011	
Journal of the first voyage of Vasco da Gama to India, 1497-1499	Portugal	Biblioteca Pública Municipal do Porto 41°08′46″N 8°36′06″W	2013	
Official Records of Macao During the Qing Dynasty (1693-1886)	Portugal, China	Torre do Tombo National Archive, Alvalade, Lisbon 38°45′17″N 9°09′23″W	2017	
Register Books of visas granted by Portuguese Consul in Bordeaux, Aristides Sousa Mendes (1939-1940)	Portugal	Instituto Diplomático do Ministério dos Negócios Estrangeiros 38°42′24″N 9°10′16″W	2017	
First Voyage of Circumnavigation by Fernão de Magalhães and Juan Sebastián Elcano (1519-1522)	Portugal, Netherlands, Spain, United States	*Arquivo Nacional da Torre do Tombo, Lisbon 38°45′17″N 9°09′23″W; Archivo General de Indias, Seville 37°23′02″N 5°59′31″W; Yale University, New Haven 41°18′59″N 72°55′20″W; Leiden University Library 52°09′26″N 4°28′53″E	2023	
Archangel Gospel of 1092	Russia	Russian State Library, Moscow 55°45′06″N 37°36′32″E	1997	
Khitrovo Gospel	Russia	Russian State Library, Moscow 55°45′06″N 37°36′32″E	1997	
Slavonic publications in Cyrillic script of the 15th century	Russia	Russian State Library, Moscow 55°45′06″N 37°36′32″E	1997	
Newspaper collections	Russia	Russian State Library, Moscow 55°45′06″N 37°36′32″E	1997	
Maps of the Russian empire and its collection of the 18th century	Russia	Russian State Library, Moscow 55°45′06″N 37°36′32″E	1997	
Russian posters of the end of the 19th and early 20th centuries	Russia	Russian State Library, Moscow 55°45′06″N 37°36′32″E	1997	
The Historical Collections (1889–1955) of St. Petersburg Phonogram Archives	Russia	The Institute of Russian Literature (Pushkinsky Dom) 59°56′42″N 30°18′05″E	2001	
Ostromir Gospel (1056–1057)	Russia	Russian National Library, Saint Petersburg 59°56′01″N 30°20′09″E	2011	
Tolstoy's Personal Library and Manuscripts, Photo and Film Collection	Russia	State Museum-Estate of Leo Tolstoy Yasnaya Polyana 54°04′10″N 37°31′24″E	2011	
The Laurentian Chronicle 1377	Russia	Russian State Library, Moscow 55°45′06″N 37°36′32″E	2013	
The Sobornoye Ulozheniye of 1649	Russia	Russian State Archives of Ancient Acts 55°43′59″N 37°34′27″E	2015	
Album of Indian and Persian Miniatures from the 16th through the 18th Century and Specimens of Persian Calligraphy	Russia	Institute of Oriental Manuscripts, Russian Academy of Sciences 59°56′39″N 30°19′19″E	2017	
Fyodor Dostoevsky: Handwritings and Notes	Russia	Russian State Archive of Literature and Art 55°50′01″N 37°29′18″E	2023	
The Khludov Psalter	Russia	State Historical Museum, Moscow	2025	
Vita Sanctorum Marini et Leonis, Manuscript MS F.III.16, Turin, Italy	San Marino, Croatia, Italy	National University Library of Turin	2025	
Nikola Tesla's Archive	Serbia	Nikola Tesla Museum, Belgrade 44°48′18″N 20°28′15″E	2003	
Miroslav Gospel – Manuscript from 1180	Serbia	National Museum, Belgrade 44°49′00″N 20°27′36″E	2005	
Telegram of Austria-Hungary's declaration of war on Serbia on 28 July 1914	Serbia	Archives of Serbia 44°48′25″N 20°28′30″E	2015	
First Summit Meeting of the Non-Aligned Movement Archives	Serbia	Archives of Serbia 44°48′25″N 20°28′30″E	2023	
Illuminated Codices from the Library of the Bratislava Chapter House	Slovakia	National Archives, Bratislava 48°09′36″N 17°04′55″E	1997	
Basagic Collection of Islamic Manuscripts	Slovakia	University Library, Bratislava 48°08′37″N 17°06′23″E	1997	
Mining maps and plans of the Main Chamber - Count Office in Banská Štiavnica	Slovakia	State Central Mining Archives 48°27′33″N 18°53′36″E	2007	
Santa Fe Capitulations	Spain	Archive of the Crown of Aragon, Barcelona 41°23′02″N 2°10′37″E	2009	
Treaty of Tordesillas	Spain, Portugal	General Archive of the Indies, Seville 37°23′05″N 5°59′36″W; Arquivo Nacional da Torre do Tombo, Lisbon 38°45′17″N 9°09′23″W	2007	
Llibre del Sindicat Remença (1448)	Spain	Girona Municipal Archive 41°59′13″N 2°49′30″E	2013	
The Decreta of León of 1188 - The oldest documentary manifestation of the European parliamentary system	Spain	Biblioteca Capitular y Colombina de Sevilla 37°23′12″N 5°59′34″W; British Library 51°31′46″N 0°07′41″W; Biblioteca Nacional de España 40°25′25″N 3°41′22″W; Real Academia de la Historia 40°24′49″N 3°41′56″W; Biblioteca del Colegio de Santa Cruz de Valladolid 41°39′05″N 4°43′12″W	2013	
Materials Related to the Keicho-era Mission to Europe Japan and Spain	Spain, Japan	Sendai City Museum, Sendai 38°15′22″N 140°51′24″E	2013	
Indigenous language vocabulary from the New World translated into Spanish	Spain	General Archive of the Indies, Seville 37°23′05″N 5°59′36″W	2015	
The Manuscripts of the Commentary to the Apocalypse (Beatus of Liébana) in the Iberian Tradition	Spain, Portugal	Arquivo Nacional da Torre do Tombo, Lisbon 38°45′17″N 9°09′23″W; Archive of the Crown of Aragon, Barcelona 41°23′02″N 2°10′37″E; Biblioteca Nacional de Portugal, Lisbon 38°45′04″N 9°09′09″W; Real Biblioteca del Monasterio de San Lorenzo de El Escorial 40°35′21″N 4°08′52″W; Real Academia de la Historia, Madrid 40°24′49″N 3°41′56″W; Archivo Histórico Nacional, Madrid 40°26′27″N 3°41′13″W; Biblioteca Nacional de España, Madrid 40°25′25″N 3°41′22″W; Museo Arqueológico Nacional, Madrid 40°25′25″N 3°41′22″W; Archivo de la Real Chancillería de Valladolid 41°39′25″N 4°43′12″W	2015	
Archives of Santiago Ramón y Cajal and the Spanish Neurohistological School	Spain	Cajal Institute, Madrid 40°26′54″N 3°40′49″W	2017	
The Codex Calixtinus of Santiago de Compostela Cathedral and other medieval copies of the Liber Sancti Jacobi: The Iberian origins of the Jacobian tradition in Europe	Spain, Portugal	Archive-Library of the Cathedral of Santiago de Compostela 42°52′52″N 8°32′37″E; Biblioteca Nacional de España 40°25′25″N 3°41′22″W; General Archive of the Crown of Aragon, Barcelona 41°23′02″N 2°10′37″E; The Historical Library, University of Salamanca 40°57′41″N 5°40′01″W; National Library of Portugal 38°45′04″N 9°09′09″W	2017	
The General Archive of Simancas	Spain	Archivo General de Simancas 41°35′31″N 4°49′44″W	2017	
Royal Philanthropic Expedition of the Smallpox Vaccine, 1800-1820	Spain	General Subdirectorate of the State Archives, Madrid 40°25′14″N 3°41′47″W	2023	
Simón Ruiz Archive (Medina del Campo, Spain)	Spain	Museo de las Ferias 41°18′34″N 4°55′06″W	2023	
Arabic Letters	Spain	General Subdirectorate of the State Archives, Madrid 40°25′14″N 3°41′47″W	2025	
Archives of the European War Office in Madrid (1915-1921)	Spain	Patrimonio Nacional, Madrid	2025	
Astrid Lindgren Archives	Sweden	The Royal Library, Stockholm 59°20′18″N 18°04′20″E	2005	
Emmanuel Swedenborg Collection	Sweden	The Royal Library, Stockholm 59°20′18″N 18°04′20″E	2005	
Ingmar Bergman Archives	Sweden	Swedish Film Institute 59°29′05″N 17°53′42″E	2007	
The Alfred Nobel Family Archives	Sweden	Regional Archives, Lund 55°41′25″N 13°13′04″E; National Archives, Stockholm 59°19′37″N 18°01′21″E	2007	
Codex Argenteus – the ‘Silver Bible’	Sweden	Uppsala University Library 59°51′18″N 17°37′53″E	2011	
Stockholm City Planning Committee Archives	Sweden	Stockholm City Archives 59°19′49″N 18°02′58″E	2011	
Dag Hammarskjöld Collection	Sweden	The Royal Library, Stockholm 59°20′18″N 18°04′20″E	2017	
The Swedish Freedom of the Press Ordinance of 1766: The world’s first legislation guaranteeing free communication of information	Sweden	Swedish National Archives, Stockholm 59°19′37″N 18°01′21″E; The National Library of Sweden, Stockholm 59°20′18″N 18°04′20″E	2023	
Ravensbrück archive in Lund	Sweden	Lund University Library	2025	
Karl Tirén's collection of sami yoik	Sweden	National Collections of Music, Theatre and Dance, Stockholm	2025	
Jean-Jacques Rousseau, Geneva and Neuchâtel Collections	Switzerland	Bibliothèque de Genève 46°11′56″N 6°08′43″E; Public and University Library of Neuchâtel 46°59′24″N 6°55′53″E; Société Jean-Jacques Rousseau 46°12′28″N 6°08′00″E	2011	
The Montreux Jazz Festival: Claude Nobs' Legacy	Switzerland	Montreux Jazz Festival Foundation 46°26′01″N 6°56′39″E	2013	
Bibliotheca Bodmeriana (1916-1971)	Switzerland	Martin Bodmer Foundation 46°12′55″N 6°10′50″E	2015	
Documentary heritage of the former Abbey of Saint Gall in the Abbey Archives and the Abbey Library of Saint Gall	Switzerland	Abbey Archives and the Abbey Library of Saint Gallen 47°25′25″N 9°22′42″E; Zentralbibliothek Zürich 47°22′28″N 8°32′43″E; Dominican convent of St. Catherine 47°27′55″N 9°03′01″E; Gottfried Keller Foundation 46°56′29″N 7°26′59″E	2017	
Statements made by Indigenous Peoples at the United Nations 1982 to 2015	Switzerland	Docip- Indigenous Peoples' Centre for Documentation, Research and Information 46°13′32″N 6°08′03″E	2017	
Heidi- and Johanna Spyri Archives	Switzerland	Heidiseum, Zurich 8°32′21″N 47°22′10″E	2023	
Annemarie Schwarzenbach and Ella Maillart: two women’s views on the world	Switzerland	Swiss National Library, Bern; Bibliothèque de Genève; Photo Elysée, Lausanne	2025	
The Geneva Conventions of 1864, 1906, 1929 and 1949, as well as Additional Protocols of 1977 and 2005	Switzerland	Swiss Federal Archives, Bern	2025	
Drafting of the International Bill of Human Rights – UN Archives and UN Official Documents – 1946 to 1966	Switzerland, United States	United Nations Archives and Records Management Section, United Nations Library & Archives Geneva 46°13′36″N 6°08′25″E	2025	
IMO Legacy Collection	Switzerland	World Meteorological Organization, Geneva 46°12′47″N 6°07′09″E	2025	
The manuscript of Ubayd Zakoni's Kulliyat and Hafez Sherozi's Gazalliyt (14th century)	Tajikistan	Institute of the Written Heritage of the Academy of Sciences, Dushanbe 38°34′15″N 68°47′31″E	2003	
The Hittite cuneiform tablets from Bogazköy	Turkey	İstanbul Archaeological Museums 41°00′42″N 28°58′53″E; Anatolian Civilisations Museum 39°56′18″N 32°51′43″E	2001	
Kandilli Observatory and Earthquake Research Institute Manuscripts	Turkey	Boğaziçi University, Kandilli Observatory and Earthquake Research Institute, Istanbul 41°03′38″N 29°03′48″E	2001	
The works of Ibn Sina in the Süleymaniye Manuscript Library	Turkey	Directorate of Turkish Manuscripts, Süleymaniye Manuscript Library 41°00′55″N 28°57′45″E	2003	
Evliya Çelebi's "Book of Travels" in the Topkapi Palace Museum Library and the Süleymaniye Manuscript Library	Turkey	Directorate of the Topkapı Palace Museum 41°00′29″N 28°58′44″E; Directorate of Turkish Manuscripts, Süleymaniye Manuscript Library 41°00′55″N 28°57′45″E	2013	
The Old Assyrian Merchant Archives of Kültepe	Turkey	İstanbul Archaeological Museums 41°00′42″N 28°58′53″E; Museum of Anatolian Civilizations 39°56′18″N 32°51′43″E; Kayseri Archaeology Museum 38°43′05″N 35°30′39″E; Bursa Museum of Turkish and Islamic Art 40°11′43″N 29°02′24″E	2015	
Compendium of the Turkic Dialects	Turkey	Millet Manuscript Library 41°01′01″N 28°57′00″E	2017	
The Piri Reis World Map (1513)	Turkey	Directorate of the Topkapı Palace Museum 41°00′29″N 28°58′44″E	2017	
Yildiz Palace Photography Collection	Turkey	Istanbul University Library Balabanağa 41°00′59″N 28°57′47″E	2023	
The Collection of Kâtip Çelebi: Cihânnümâ and Kashf al-Zunun	Turkey	National Library of Turkey 39°55′01″N 32°49′38″E; Köprülü Manuscripts Library 41°00′29″N 28°58′21″E	2023	
Karatepe-Aslantaş Inscriptions	Turkey	Karatepe-Aslantaş Open Air Museum, Kadirli	2025	
Collection of Jewish Musical Folklore (1912–1947)	Ukraine	Vernadsky National Library of Ukraine, Kyiv 50°24′15″N 30°31′06″E	2005	
Documentary Heritage Related to accident at Chernobyl	Ukraine	State Archival Service of Ukraine, Kyiv 50°25′19″N 30°28′56″E	2017	
Documentary Heritage of Babyn Yar	Ukraine	State Archival Service of Ukraine, Kyiv 50°25′19″N 30°28′56″E	2023	
The Battle of the Somme	United Kingdom	Imperial War Museum, London. 51°29′45″N 0°06′31″W	2005	
Hereford Mappa Mundi	United Kingdom	The Hereford Mappa Mundi Trust, Hereford 52°03′13″N 2°42′54″W	2007	
Magna Carta, issued in 1215	United Kingdom	British Library 51°31′46″N 0°07′41″W; Lincoln Cathedral 53°14′03″N 0°32′10″W; Salisbury Cathedral 51°03′54″N 1°47′50″W	2009	
Registry of Slaves of the British Caribbean 1817-1834	The Bahamas, Belize, Dominican Republic, Jamaica, Saint Kitts and Nevis, Trinidad and Tobago, United Kingdom	Bahamas Archives, Nassau 25°04′19″N 77°19′21″W; Belize Archives and Records Service 17°15′08″N 88°46′07″W; National Documentation Centre, Roseau 15°18′02″N 61°23′11″W; Jamaica Archives & Records Department 17°59′49″N 76°57′17″W; National Archives, Government Headquarters 17°17′44″N 62°43′30″W; National Archives Trinidad and Tobago 10°39′37″N 61°30′46″W; The National Archives-Kew 51°28′53″N 0°16′48″W	2009	
Historic Ethnographic Recordings (1898 – 1951) at the British Library	United Kingdom	British Library 51°31′46″N 0°07′41″W	2011	
Membership Application Certificates (Candidates Circulars)	United Kingdom	Institution of Civil Engineers 51°30′04″N 0°07′44″W	2013	
Arthur Bernard Deacon (1903–27) collection MS 90-98	United Kingdom, Vanuatu	Royal Anthropological Institute, London 51°31′26″N 0°08′24″W	2013	
Autograph First World War Diary of Field Marshal Sir Douglas Haig, 1914–1919.	United Kingdom	National Library of Scotland 55°56′55″N 3°11′31″W	2015	
The Churchill Papers	United Kingdom	Churchill College, Cambridge 52°12′46″N 0°05′58″E	2015	
The West India Committee collection	United Kingdom, Antigua and Barbuda, Jamaica, Anguilla, Montserrat	Museum of London; Thames Police Association; Royal Museums Greenwich; The National Archives; Montserrat National Trust; Jamaican Defence Force; Government of Anguilla; Museum of Antigua and Barbuda	2016	
The Gertrude Bell Archive	United Kingdom	Robinson Library, Newcastle University, Newcastle upon Tyne 54°58′52″N 1°36′40″W	2017	
The Orwell Papers	United Kingdom	University College London 51°31′29″N 0°08′02″W	2017	
An African Song or Chant from Barbados	United Kingdom, Barbados	Gloucestershire Archives 51°52′07″N 2°14′28″W	2017	
The ‘Shakespeare Documents’, a documentary trail of the life of William Shakespeare	United Kingdom, United States	The National Archives-Kew 51°28′53″N 0°16′48″W; The Shakespeare Birthplace Trust 52°11′39″N 1°42′31″W; Holy Trinity Church Parish Office, Stratford-upon-Avon 52°11′12″N 1°42′27″W; Stratford-upon-Avon Town Council 52°11′29″N 1°42′25″W; Folger Shakespeare Library 38°53′21″N 77°00′10″W; Diocese of Worcester 42°15′56″N 71°48′23″W; High Court, Royal Courts of Justice 51°30′49″N 0°06′47″W; College of Arms 51°30′44″N 0°05′56″W; London Metropolitan Archives 51°31′32″N 0°06′27″W	2017	
The Gramophone Discs and Papers of the EMI Archive Trust, 1897-1914	United Kingdom	EMI Archive Trust 51°30′30″N 0°25′52″W	2023	
Documentary heritage relating to the life and work of Charles Darwin	United Kingdom	Cambridge University Library; Linnean Society of London; Natural History Museum, London; National Library of Scotland; Royal Botanic Gardens, Kew	2025	
The large format 68mm films of the Mutoscope & Biograph Company	United Kingdom, France, Netherlands, United States	Museum of Modern Art, New York City; Cinémathèque Française, Paris; British Film Institute, London; Eye Filmmuseum, Amsterdam; National Centre of Cinematography and Animated Pictures, Paris	2025	
Universalis Cosmographia (Waldseemüller map)	United States	Library of Congress, Washington, D.C. 38°53′19″N 77°00′19″W	2005	
The Wizard of Oz (Victor Fleming 1939), produced by Metro-Goldwyn-Mayer	United States	George Eastman House, Rochester 43°09′10″N 77°34′49″W	2007	
John Marshall Ju'hoan Bushman Film and Video Collection, 1950–2000	United States	Smithsonian Institution, Suitland 38°53′10″N 77°01′17″W	2009	
Landsat Program records: Multispectral Scanner (MSS) sensors	United States	U.S. Geological Survey 38°56′50″N 77°22′03″W	2011	
Silver Men: West Indian Labourers at the Panama Canal	United States, United Kingdom, Barbados, Jamaica, Panama, Saint Lucia	Barbados Museum and Historical Society, St. Michael 13°05′00″N 59°36′08″W; Bahamas Archives, Nassau 25°04′19″N 77°19′21″W; Jamaican Archives and Records Department 17°59′49″N 76°57′17″W; National Library of Jamaica 17°58′02″N 76°47′24″W; St. Lucia National Archives 14°01′10″N 60°59′55″W; Panama Canal Museum 8°57′07″N 79°32′05″W; Mrs. Primrose Mallet-Harris, Mallet Court 50°59′41″N 2°57′12″W; The National Archives-Kew 51°28′53″N 0°16′48″W; The National Archives and Records Administration 39°00′02″N 76°57′35″W; The George A. Smathers Library 29°39′06″N 82°20′34″W	2011	
Permanent Collection of the Eleanor Roosevelt Papers Project	United States	George Washington University 38°53′49″N 77°02′40″W	2013	
Moses and Frances Asch Collection. Center for Folklife and Cultural Heritage, Smithsonian Institution	United States	Smithsonian Institution, Suitland 38°53′10″N 77°01′17″W	2015	
The Villa Ocampo Documentation Center	United States, Argentina	UNESCO Villa Ocampo, San Isidro 34°27′29″S 58°31′06″W; Harvard College Library, Cambridge, Massachusetts 42°22′23″N 71°06′57″W	2017	
Key documents for Deaf communities: the Milan Congress, 1880	United States, Finland	Gallaudet University Archives, Washington D.C. 38°54′31″N 76°59′33″W; World Federation of the Deaf, Helsinki 60°13′18″N 24°54′10″E	2023	
Camiu't Tevarih/ Jāmiʿ al-Tawārīkh	Uzbekistan, Turkey	Topkapı Palace Museum Library, Istanbul; Al-Biruni Institute of Oriental Studies, Academy of Sciences of Uzbekistan, Tashkent	2025	

== See also ==
- UK Memory of the World Register

== Notes ==
Names and spellings provided are based on the official list released by the Memory of the World Programme.
