= Ishkhneli sisters =

The Ishkhneli sisters were a quartet of Georgian singers who performed traditional Georgian music during the Soviet era. There were five sisters in all, but not all performed together during the life of the group; they were Nino (1898-1967), Tamari (1900 - 1994), Zinaida (1902-1968), Alexandra (1904-1955), and Mariami (1889-1973).

The sisters were natives of Kutaisi, and formed a singing group in 1918 to perform concerts around that town; this disbanded the following year. In 1941, they officially reconstituted the group, which consisted of Nino, Tamari, Zinaida, and Alexandra; Tamari served as director, and also composed a number of songs for the ensemble. The sisters performed concerts for the military during World War II, and in 1949 were named Honored Artists of Georgia. Mariam was later named an Honored Artist of the Georgian SSR, and Tamari received the same honor in 1976. At her death in 1955 Alexandra was replaced by her sister Mariami. The sisters disbanded the quartet in 1967. The Ishkhneli sisters were honored by their native city in 2006 when the street where they had been born, Vazha-Pshavela Street, was renamed in their honor; that same year a statue depicting them playing folk instruments was erected along the main boulevard. The National Archives of Georgia contain extensive materials relating to the sisters.

Recordings made by the sisters exist.
