= Anchi Gospel =

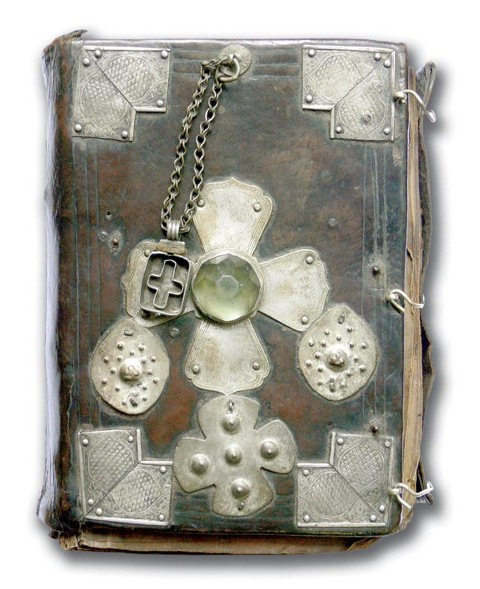
Anchi Gospel front cover

Anchi Gospel is a Georgian manuscript of the Gospel dating back to the 11th-12th centuries and kept in the National Archives of Georgia. Anchi's Gospel is written on parchment, in Nuskhuri script. The front side of the gospel is stamped with silver, decorated with green glass. The holy book is accompanied by a colorful miniature of Matthew the Apostle. The original cover, which is missing, was engraved by Beka Opizari. The Gospel consists of 269 pages, including 3 unwritten pages. At the bottom of the manuscript, there is an inscription, where the copyist of the Gospel, Archbishop Tevdore of Ancha, mentions Davit Soslan, King Tamar, Lasha-Giorgi and Beka, the gold sculptor. The manuscript was brought from the church of Tskarostavi (Klarjeti) by the order of King Tamar and placed in Anchiskhati church.

The restoration of the unique historical monument was financed by the International Charity Fund of the Catholicos-Patriarch of All Georgia for the Revival and Development of Spirituality, Science and Culture in 2008.

At the same time, the Gospel of Anchi was examined in the National Bureau of Forensic Expertise of the Ministry of Justice of Georgia. As a result of the examination, the period of copying the Gospel and the type of green eye on the leather cover were clarified.
