= National Archives of Georgia =

Legal entity of the nation of Georgia

- Georgian: საქართველოს ეროვნული არქივი
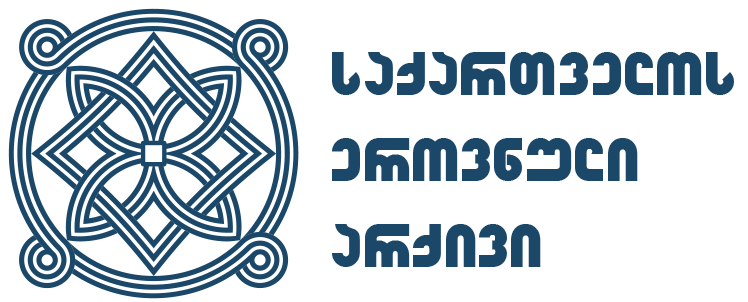

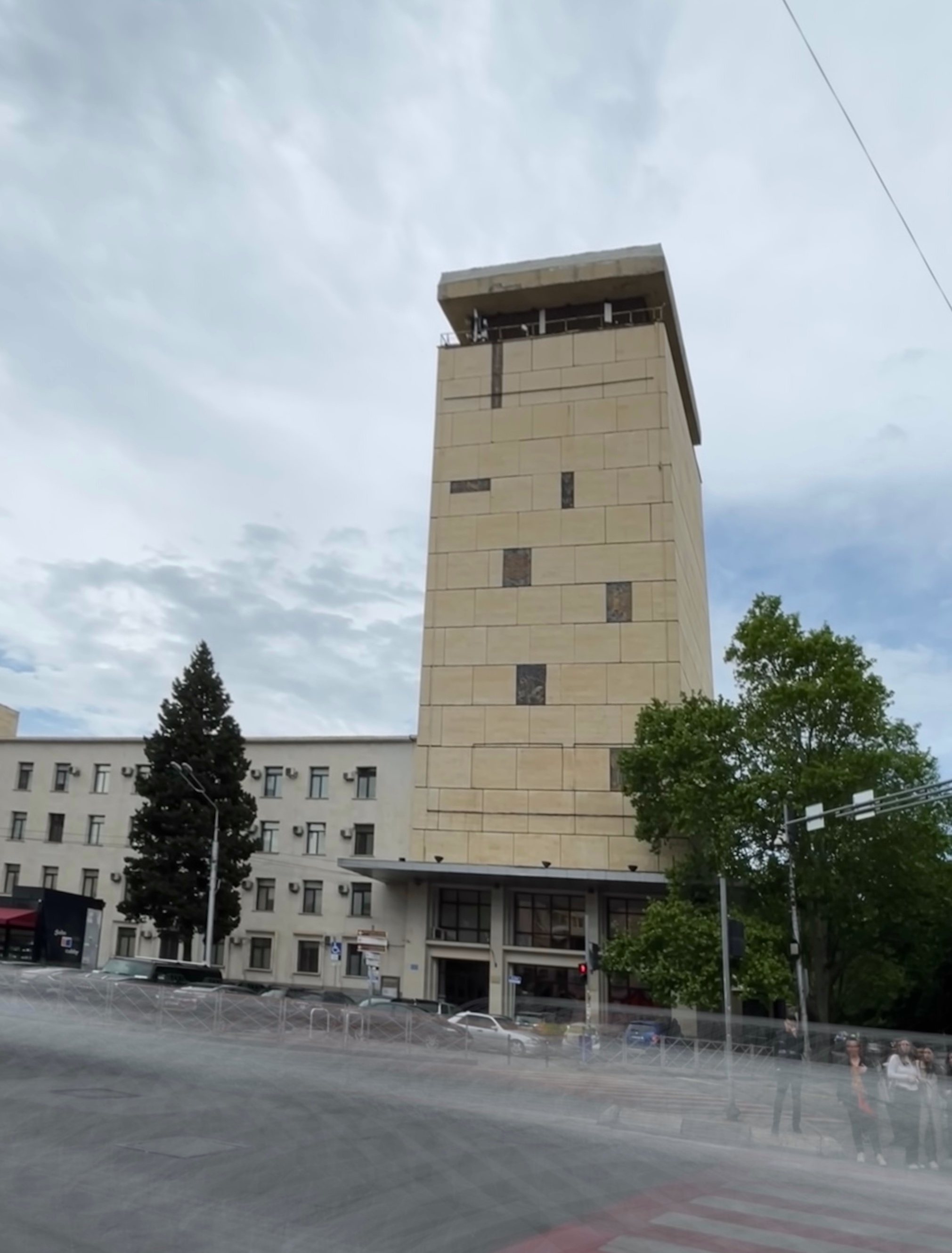
- National Archives of Georgia

Archive overview
- Formed: April 23, 1920; 106 years ago
- Jurisdiction: Ministry of Justice of Georgia
- Headquarters: 1 Vazha-Pshavela Ave., Tbilisi, Georgia; 41°43′42″N 44°46′03″E
- Website: archive.gov.ge

The National Archives of Georgia (Georgian: საქართველოს ეროვნული არქივი, romanized: sakartvelos erovnuli arkivi) is the legal entity of public law under the Ministry of Justice of the nation of Georgia. The National Archives holds written documents, film documents, photos, and audio records, with a collection totaling more than five million items. The documents in the Archives are official, and their preservation has been established by law. Some of the preserved documents include texts from the First Republic, scientific archives, the parish books that hold information about the christening and the death of citizens, the gospel of the 9th century, Anchi gospel (12th century), Kings' deeds, private letters, verdicts, other legal monuments, photos from the 19th century, first film documents, and the documents of different state or private structures.

== The History of the National Archives ==
According to documents within the Archives, the law that established what is now the national archives was passed and the archives were established by the government of what was then the Democratic Republic of Georgia on April 23, 1920. Following Sovietization, a decree passed on July 1, 1921 governed the archival procedures under the Georgian SSR. As of 2004, operations of the archive fell within the State Department of Archives of Georgia, a part of the Ministry of Justice of Georgia and Law 71 by the Minister, passed on March 12, 2007, established the National Archives of Georgia as a legal entity.

A new building was constructed in the 1960s as the prior building did not meet fire and other codes for historic preservation. A 2023 fire destroyed some items and raised concern for renewed criticism about the state of the archives' buildings.

A new media center was announced in 2017 to showcase the archive's extensive film collection and the theatre opened in 2018.

=== Collection ===
Neumatic Hymns, 10th-11th cc.

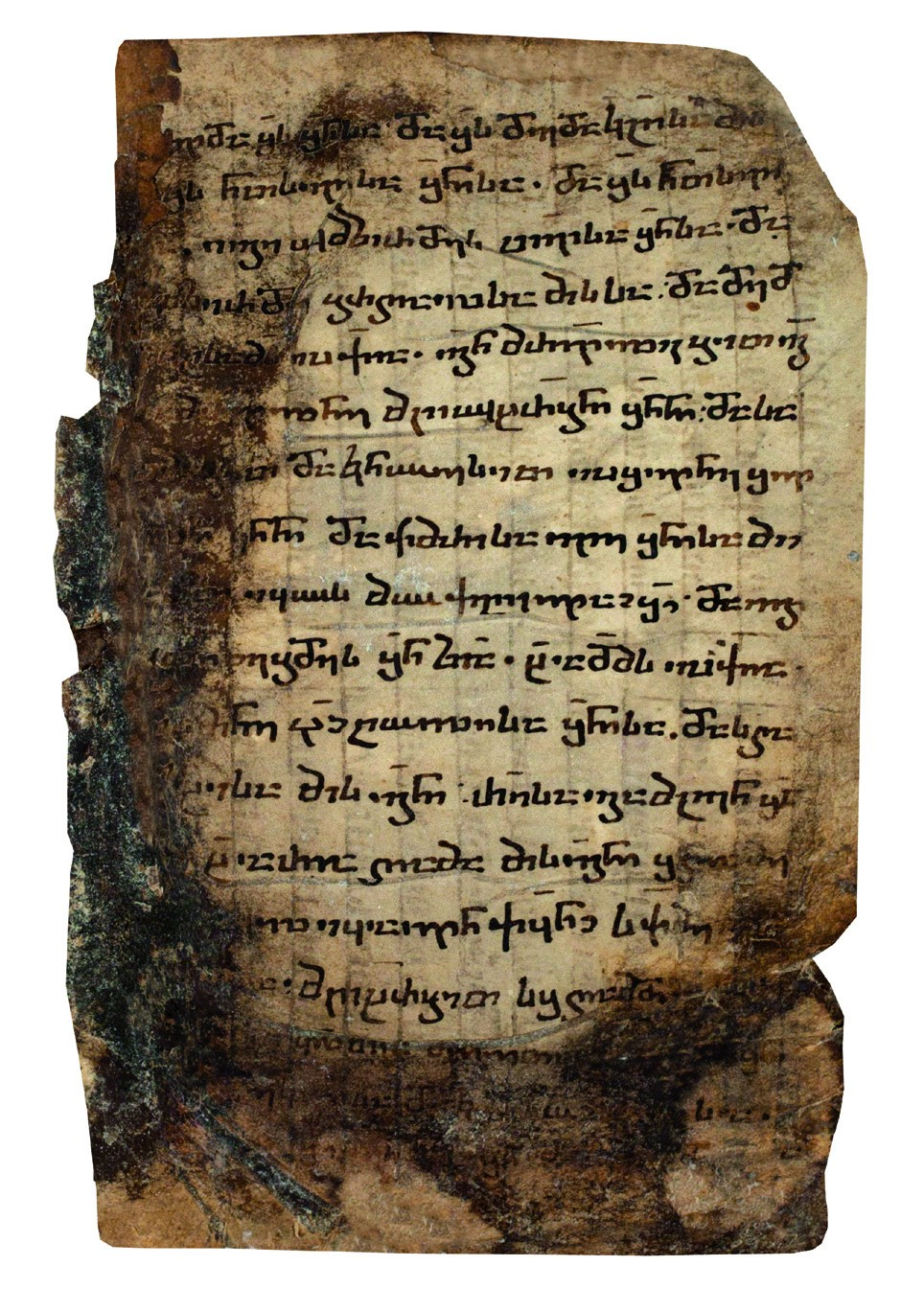
Triodion 13th-14th cc. Georgian manuscript

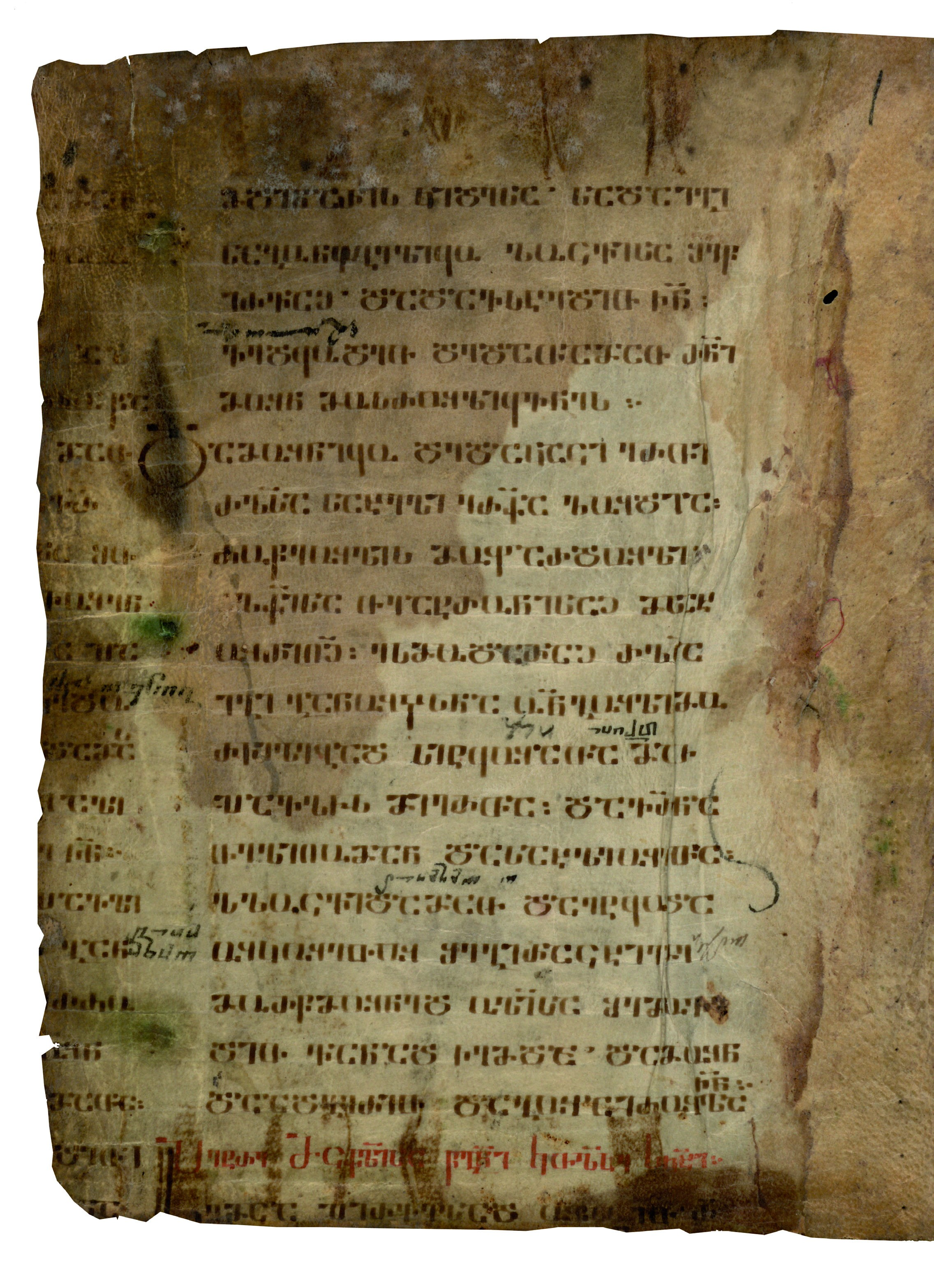
Lectionary, 10th c. 1446/350

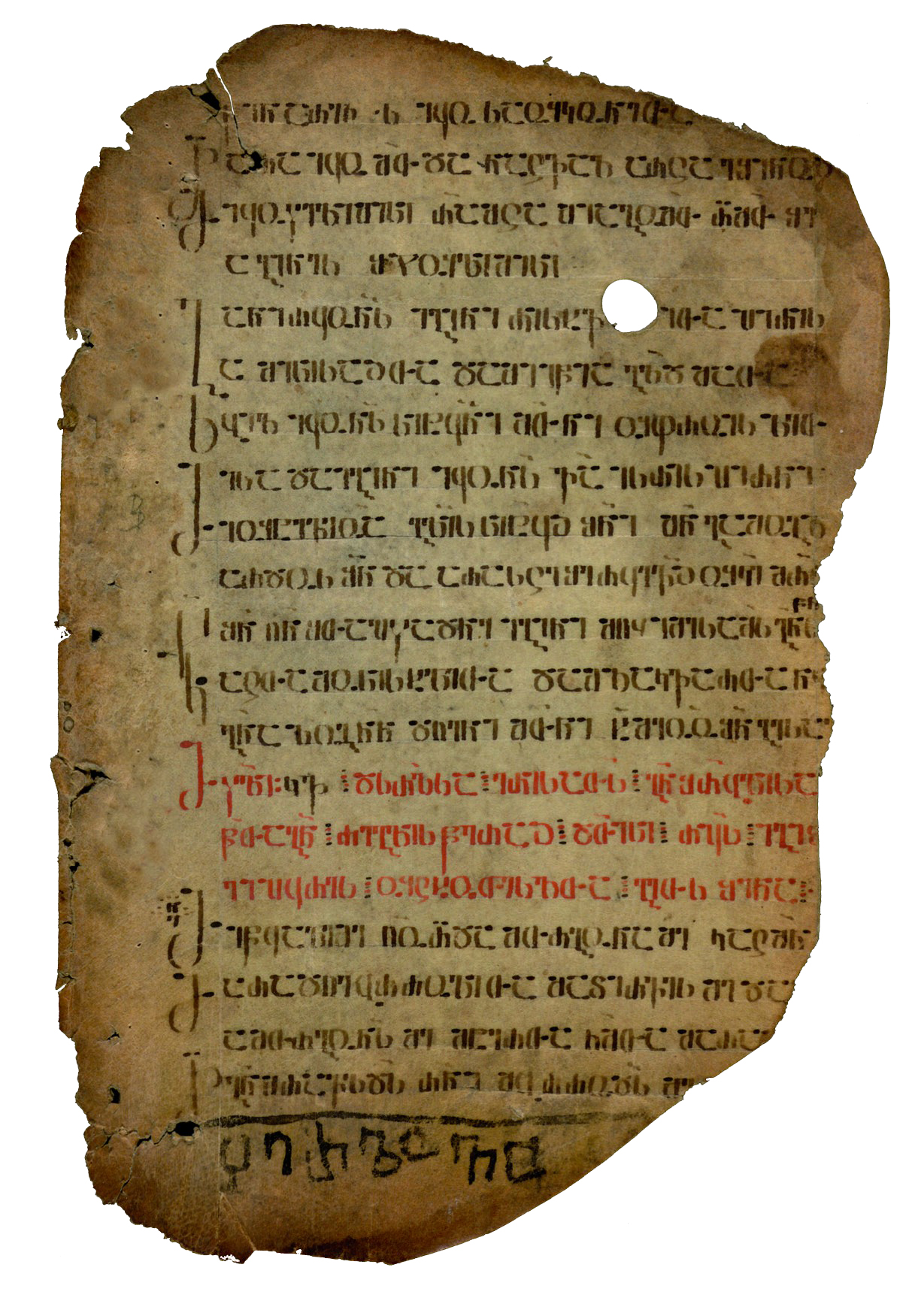
Psalter, 10th c. 1446/171

The Central Historical Archive, located in Tbilisi, is the main hub for historical documents and the archives contain many documents pertaining to the ancient history of what is now Georgia.

Among the items in the collection are:

- The gospel of 1534 is the earliest among the dated manuscripts. Its leather cover is decorated with silver cross.
- the Neumatic Hymns, a manuscript with musical notes believed to date to the 10th or 11th century that shows Georgian musical notes. A similar note system is preserved only in few old Georgian manuscripts (hymns by Mikael Modrekili, Neumatic hirmologion, etc.). These musical notes could be read based on an oral tradition survived in separate families up to the 19 c.
- The Triodion is a 13th or 14th century Georgian manuscript known technically as fond #1446, manuscript #322. The work has 41 pages made of parchment, with printing in black ink composed of angular Nuskhuri script. Its dimensions are 220 mm x 142 mm. All pages of the manuscript are palimpsests; the lower layer of the text is Armenian, and represents an Armenian translation of the lectionary; the palimpsest text is written vertically in relation to the upper layer of the text. Two upper pages of the Georgian text form one page of the lower Armenian text. The Terminus ante quem for the Armenian manuscript is the 9th or 10th century. The Armenian translation of the lectionary, together with the Georgian and Albanian translations, has preserved an account of the oldest, Jerusalem liturgical practice.
- Lectionary 1446/350 is a 10th-century Parchment fragment, documented as "fond #1446, manuscript #350) 2 pp. parchment; fragment; dimensions: 233x180; Asomtavruli; ink – brown; title and initials – with cinnabar; written in two columns; ruling lines are discernible." This fragment, reflecting the oldest Jerusalem liturgical tradition, is a valuable asset to fill in gaps in the overall picture of the entire cultural heritage. Due to the establishment of the Constantinopolitan liturgical tradition, the Jerusalem lectionary was withdrawn from the service and was left in oblivion, so that its Greek version is not preserved. Lectionaries in Georgian, Armenian and Albanian, on the one hand, provide a perfect possibility to get some idea of the liturgical practice of an early date and, on the other hand, to reconstruct older translations of the Old and New Testament pericopes, than were known to date from separate manuscripts or their fragments. In 2015 Lectionary 1446/350 was inscribed to UNESCO Memory of the World Register.
- Psalter 10th c., fond #1446, manuscript #171) 2 pp. parchment; fragment; dimensions: 207x138; Asomtavruli; ink – brown; title and initials – with cinnabar; ruling lines are discernible. The fragmentary preserved text is a pre-athonite translation of the Psalter. Another part of this manuscript, also fragmented, is kept at Korneli Kekelidze, the National Centre of Manuscripts where it's indexed as (S-5222, S-5223) and these fragments were inscribed in the UNESCO Memory of the World Register in 2012.

The manuscript is dated from the 10th c.; in terms of the text version, it follows one of the earliest Georgian translations of the Psalter. In 2015 Psalter 1446/171 was inscribed to UNESCO Memory of the World Register.

In 2006, the Archives expanded to include the Central Historical Archive of Georgia and the National Archive of Kutaisi, also known as the Kutaisis State Historical Archives.
