= EMI Archive Trust =

Coordinates: 51°30′30″N 0°25′52″W

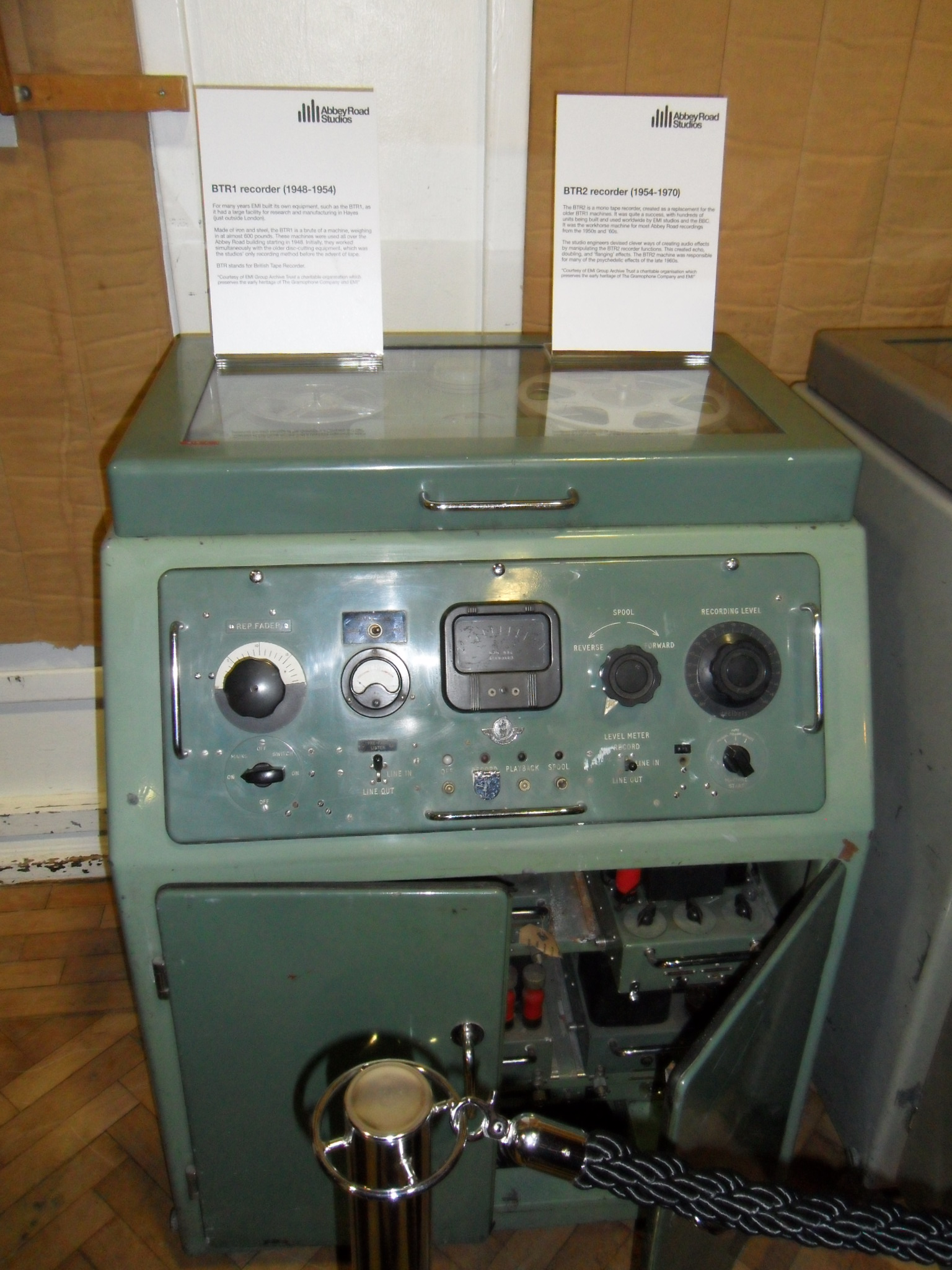
A British Tape Recorder (BTR) used to record music at the Abbey Road Studios

The EMI Archive Trust is a charity which was established in 1996 to hold and maintain the archives of the EMI company and its parent companies such as the Gramophone Company. The archives are located in Hayes, England, where EMI had its main factories, and contain many antique recordings. The trust owns the original His Master's Voice painting.
