= National Historical Archives of Belarus =

State archive in Minsk, Belarus

- Нацыянальны гістарычны архіў Беларусі; Nacyjanaĺny histaryčny archiŭ Bielarusi
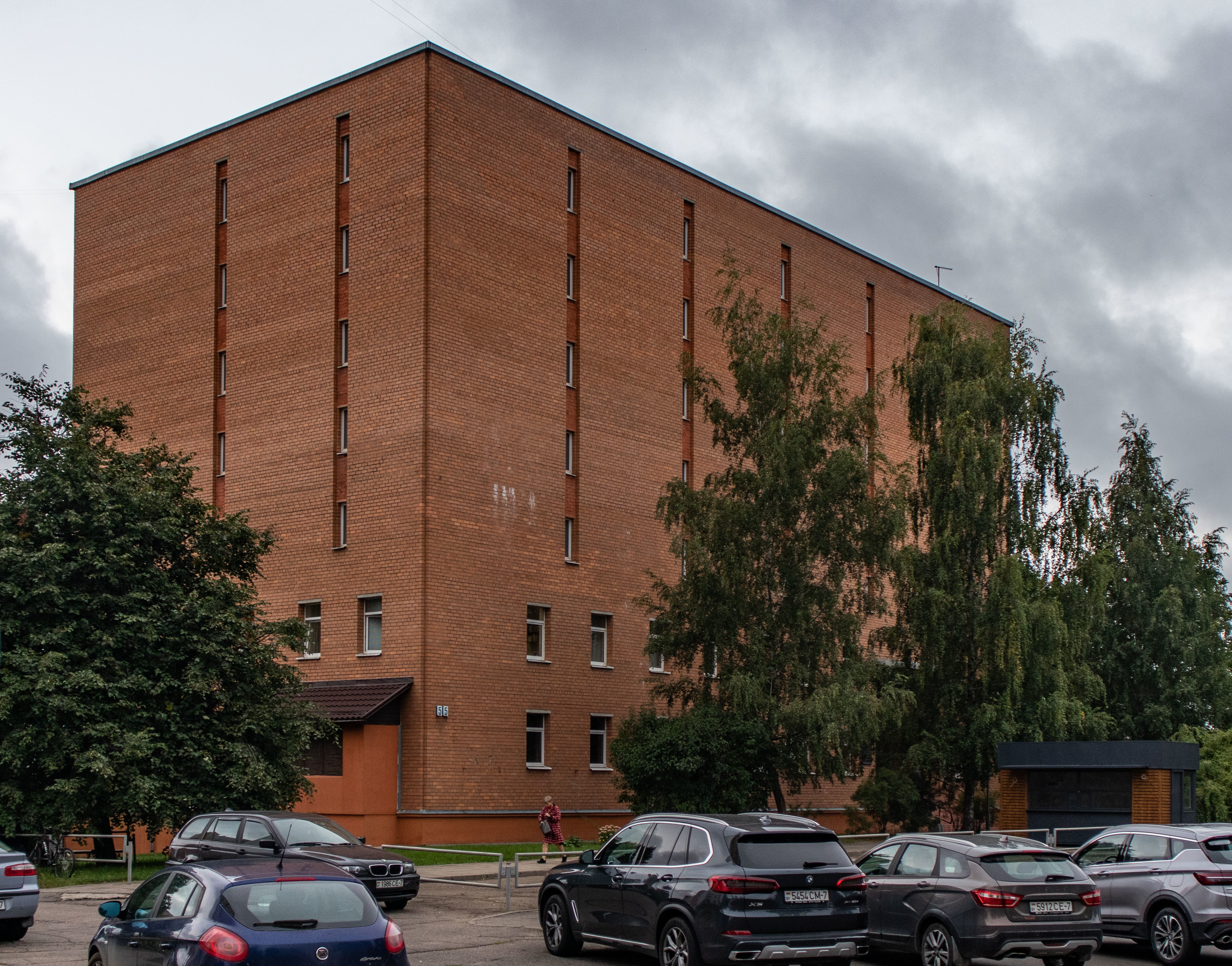
- Building of the archives on Krapotkina Street in Minsk

State Archive overview
- Formed: July 5, 1938
- Preceding State Archive: Mahilou Historical Archives
- Jurisdiction: Belarus
- Headquarters: Krapotkina Street 55, Minsk, Belarus; 53.919379°N 27.556876°E
- State Archive executive: Mikhail Glushakou, Director
- Parent State Archive: Department for Archives and Records Management of the Ministry of Justice of the Republic of Belarus
- Website: www.niab.by

The National Historical Archives of Belarus (Нацыянальны гістарычны архіў Беларусі (НГАБ), NHAB; formerly the Central Historical Archives of the BSSR) is a state repository of documents of Belarus from the 14th to the 20th centuries. It was founded in 1938 based on the Mahiliou Historical Archives and was moved to Minsk in 1963.

== History ==
Since its foundation, the archives have housed documents of general Belarusian significance from the former court archives of the Grand Duchy of Lithuania, the Polish–Lithuanian Commonwealth, and the Belarusian lands of the Russian Empire, as well as from the former archives of magistrates and town halls of Belarusian cities, private individuals, the Vilna Archives of Ancient Acts, and the Viciebsk Central Archives of Ancient Acts.

The official founding date is considered to be 5 July 1938, but its history began in 1919 as the archival storage of the Mahiliou Archive Bureau. In 1924, the repository was reorganized into the District Archive. In 1927, the Mahiliou Historical Archive was created, which was transformed in 1930 into a branch of the Central Archival Administration of the BSSR, under which the historical archive was established.

On 5 July 1938, in accordance with the decree of the Presidium of the CEC of the BSSR, the Mahiliou Historical Archive was reorganized into the Central Historical Archive, and from 1943, into the Central State Historical Archive of the BSSR (ЦДГА БССР). From September 1938, the archive was transferred to the jurisdiction of the NKVD of the BSSR, which led to negative consequences, specifically the unjustified restriction of access to documents.

By the beginning of 1941, the archive contained 1,560 funds with a total of over 382,000 files. During World War II, most of the documents were looted and taken to Germany and Riga (Latvia). Only 38,054 files (10%) from 700 funds were successfully returned. In 1947, pre-revolutionary documents from the state archives of the Viciebsk and Homiel regions were transferred to the archive. With the relocation to Minsk (Kazlova St., 26), according to the Decree of the Council of Ministers of the BSSR of 11 November 1963, pre-revolutionary documents from the State Archive of the Minsk Region and ancient acts from the Central State Historical Archive in Hrodna were added to the collection. In 1992–1995, it was part of the National Archives of Belarus. In 2000, it received its current name and address.

=== After 2020 ===
Following the mass falsifications of the 2020 Belarusian presidential election, the violent dispersal of protests, and the beating and torture of detained protesters, the archive's staff went out on 13 August for a protest action on Mašerava Avenue.

On 8 March 2022, as part of political purges, the director Dzmitry Jatsevič was dismissed, and on the same day, the deputy director for science Dzianis Lisejčykaŭ resigned.

In May 2022, Major General Aleh Voinau was appointed director of the archive; under his leadership, a series of political dismissals took place. On 14 August 2023, Mikhail Glushakou, a former KGB officer, was appointed director. On 16 August, mass detentions of archive employees occurred (at least 7 people), and some were sentenced to administrative arrest. On 23 August, at least 8 people from those previously detained were fired from the archive.

== Holdings ==
The archive contains parchment privileges of the 14th–17th centuries from the Grand Dukes of Lithuania for lands and estates, and to cities for Magdeburg rights, as well as court record books from the 15th–18th centuries. In total, there are about 6,000 record books in Old Belarusian, Polish, and Latin, containing royal privileges, charters, foundation records, wills (testaments), intromissions, decrees, and inventories. It also contains metric books of Orthodox churches, Catholic churches, and synagogues for the 19th and 20th centuries.

== Directors ==
- Aleh Voinau (10 May 2022 – 20 January 2023)
- Mikhail Glushakou (since 14 August 2023)
