= Regional Archives in Lund =

Coordinates: 55°42′3″N 13°12′6″E

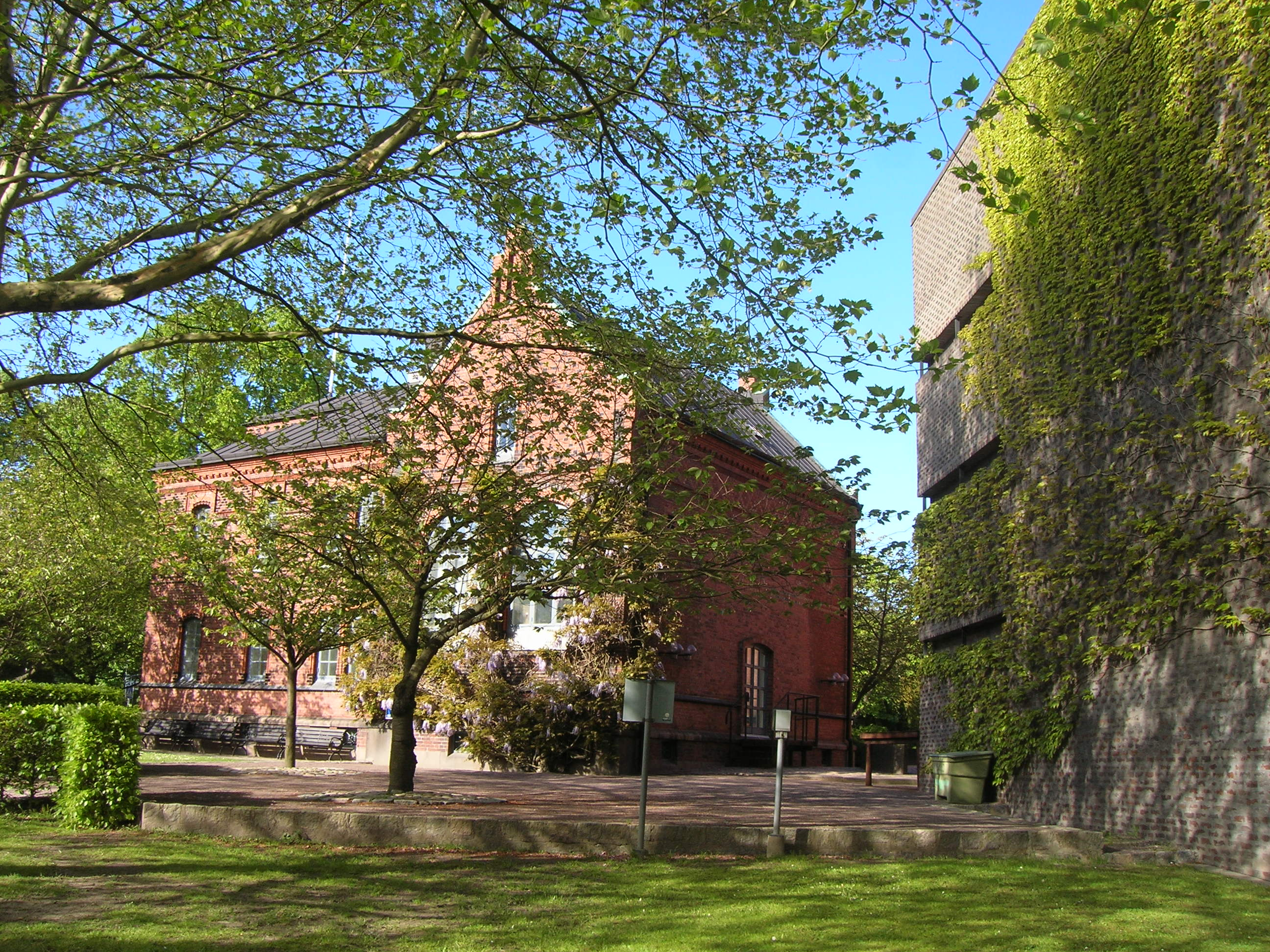
Regional Archives in Lund, the original building in the center, the 1971 building on the right.

The Regional Archives in Lund, Landsarkivet i Lund, is located in Lund and is one of the Regional Archives in Sweden, responsible for keeping records of local and regional government authorities in the historical provinces Scania, Blekinge and Halland, with exception of Malmö which is handled by the Malmö City Archives.

The archive was established in 1903 in a brick building drawn by Carl Möller in what was then the outskirts of Lund. A large extension to this building was made in 1971, drawn by Berndt Nyberg. Later on the Regional Archives needed new space teamed up with several other archives in the region and built a new archive facility called Arkivcentrum Syd on Gastelyckan in south-eastern Lund.

The first landsarkivarie (regional archivist) was Lauritz Weibull, who served until he was appointed professor at Lund University in 1919. He was then succeeded by one of his brothers, Carl Gustaf Weibull, who held the position until 1946.

== Literature ==
- Landsarkivet i Lund 1903-2003, ed. Anna Christina Ulfsparre (Landsarkivets i Lund skriftserie, 10). Lund 2003.
- Mattias Kärrholm: Landsarkivet i Lund - en byggnadshistorik (Lund 2000)
