= List of trading companies =

A trading company is a business that works with different kinds of products sold for consumer, business purposes. In contemporary times, trading companies buy a specialized range of products, shopkeeper them, and coordinate delivery of products to customers.

Trading companies may connect buyers and sellers, but not partake in the ownership or storage of goods, earning their revenue through sales commissions. They may also be structured to engage in commerce with foreign countries or territories. During times of colonization, some trading companies were granted a charter, giving them "rights to a specific territory within an area claimed by the authority granting the charter including legal title, a monopoly of trade, and governmental and military jurisdiction".

== Trading companies ==
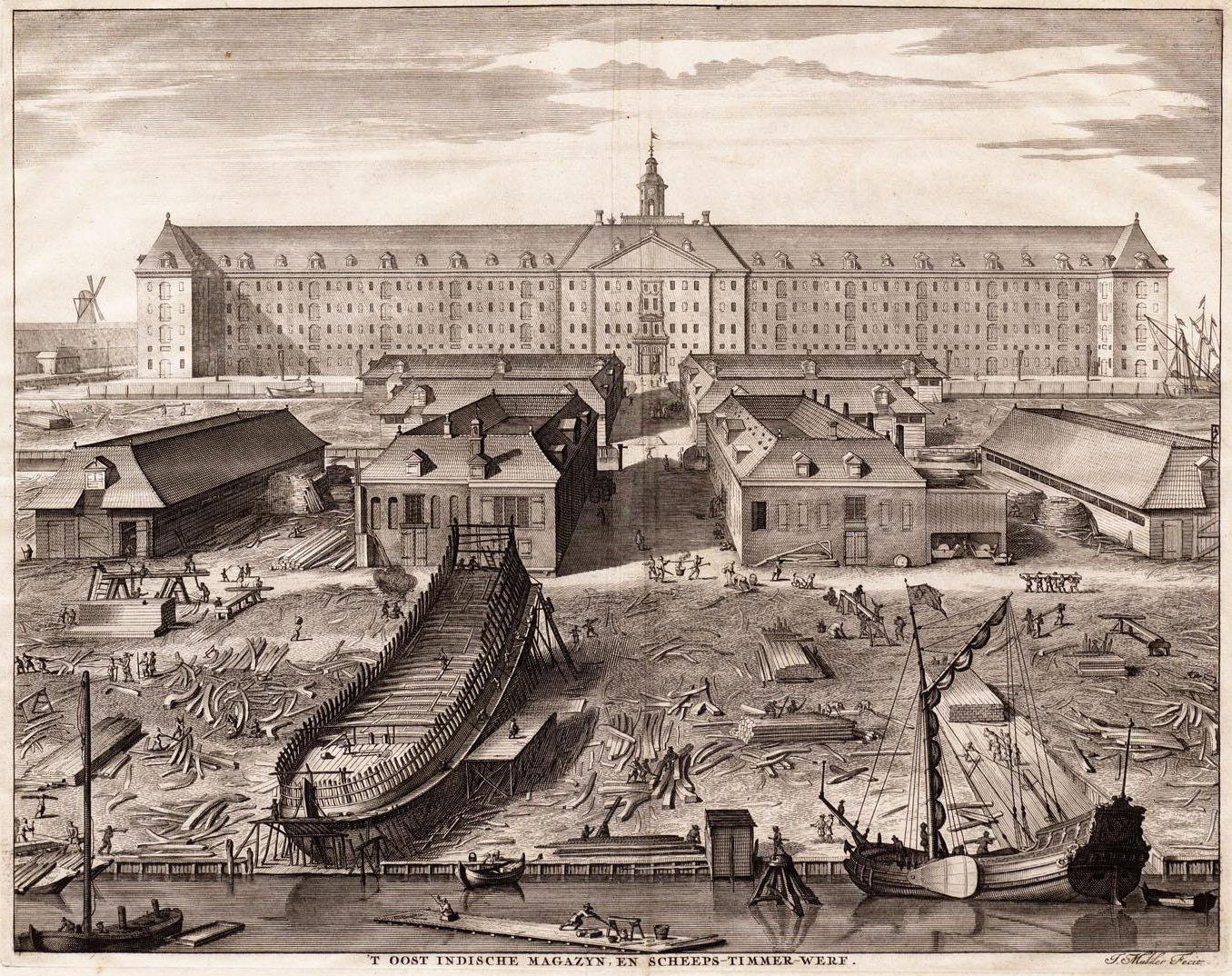
The shipyard of the Dutch East India Company in Amsterdam. 1726 engraving by Joseph Mulder.

- D.TRADING
- Glencore
- Hudson's Bay Company
- Jardine Matheson
- Li & Fung
- Noble Group
- Plus500
- Salt Trading Corporation
- Trading Corporation of Pakistan

=== By country ===
==== Brazil ====
- Amaggi Group

==== India ====
- Bombay Burmah Trading Corporation
- MMTC Ltd
- State Trading Corporation

==== Japan ====
- Itochu
- Marubeni
- Mitsubishi Corporation
- Mitsui & Co.
- Sojitz Corporation
- Sumitomo Corporation
  - Inabata & Co., Ltd.
- Toyota Tsusho

==== South Korea ====
- POSCO International
- Hyundai Corporation
- LG Corporation
- Samsung C&T Corporation
- SK Networks

==== United States ====
- Archer Daniels Midland
- Bunge
- Cargill

=== Oil traders ===
- Chemoil
- Gunvor
- Mercuria Energy Group
- MOL Group
- Trafigura
- Vitol
- Vopak

== Trading systems ==
- Globex Trading System
- DME Oman Crude Oil Futures Contract

== Defunct ==
- Afghan-German Trading Company
- African & Eastern Trade Corporation
- Apcar and Company
- Augustine Heard & Co.
- Austrian East India Company
- Barbary Company
- Bergen Greenland Company
- British East India Company
- Casa da Índia
- Compagnie de Saint-Christophe
- Compagnie des Îles de l'Amérique
- Compagnie du Nord
- Company of the Moluccas
- Company of Habitants
- Company of One Hundred Associates
- Company of Scotland
- Comprador
- Courteen association
- Danish East India Company
- Danish West India Company
- David Sassoon & Co.
- Dutch East India Company
- Dutch West India Company
- E.D. Sassoon & Co.
- Essequibo Society
- French East India Company
- French West India Company
- Gebr. Heinemann
- General Trade Company
- Genoese East India Company
- Gibb, Livingston & Co.
- Guinea Company (London)
- Guinea Company of Scotland
- Guipuzcoan Company of Caracas
- Hong Kong, Canton & Macao Steamboat Company
- Hutchison Whampoa
- Indonesia Trading Company
- John Forbes and Company
- Kaptallah
- King George's Sound Company
- Kompania Handlowa Polska
- Kunst and Albers
- Lamson & Hubbard Trading Company
- Levant Company
- London and Bristol Company
- London Company
- Middelburgsche Commercie Compagnie
- Mississippi Company
- Muscovy Company
- North West Company
- Northern Traders Company
- Northwest Cameroon Company
- Olyphant & Co.
- Portuguese East India Company
- Royal African Company
- Royal Greenland Trading Department
- Royal Philippine Company
- Russian-American Company
- Samuel Samuel & Co
- Shewan, Tomes & Co.
- Society for Navigation on Essequibo and adjacent Rivers
- Society of Berbice
- Society of Suriname
- Somers Isles Company
- South Cameroon Company
- Spoors & Sprenger
- Swedish East India Company
- Swedish Levant Company
- Swedish South Company
- Swedish West India Company
- Takahashi Trading Company
- Virginia Company

== See also ==
- Canton System
- Chartered company
- Commodity traders
- French colonial trading companies
- Fur trade
- Old China Trade
- Sogo shosha
- Spice wars
- Trade
