= Spoors & Sprenger =

Dutch Republic trading company, 1755–1781

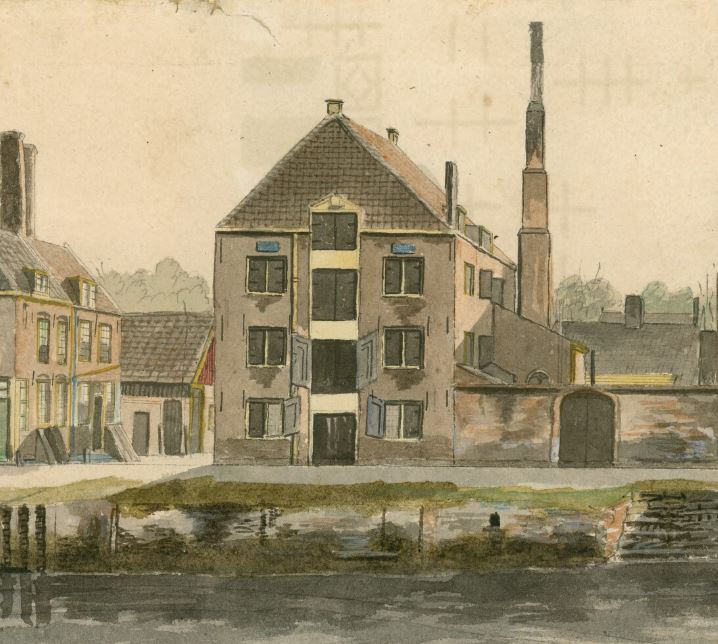
- The warehouse Luyk of the company Spoors & Sprenger at the Kousteensedijk in Middelburg, build in 1735, detail of a coloured painting, c. 1850, Zeeuws Archief, collection KZGW ZI II, 299.
- Native name: Spoors en Sprenger
- Company type: Chartered company
- Industry: Consumer goods; slaves
- Predecessor: Adriaan Spoors
- Founded: 1755
- Defunct: 18 January 1781
- Headquarters: Southside Dam Square, Middelburg, The Dutch Republic
- Key people: Johan Valentijn Sprenger; Adriaan Spoors
- Products: Liquor; beads; weapons; gunpowder; slaves; sugar; cocoa; coffee; cotton

Spoors & Sprenger was a trading company in the triangular Slave trade and colonial products between the Dutch West Indies and the Dutch Republic from about 1755 to 1781.

== Spoors and Sprenger families ==
The Sprenger family descends from the merchant and Huguenot Jean Valentin Sprenger, who fled form Valenciennes in France around 1700. He went to Zeeland and married Jacoba de Kokelaer, daughter of a VOC director in Middelburg Their son, Johan Valentijn Sprenger (Veere, 1734 – Middelburg, 1794) married Johanna Spoors (1745–1769), born in Essequibo in 1763, the daughter of Adriaan Spoors, merchant an auctioneer of the slave trade in Curaçao, who was shareholder in the Dutch West India Company and Middelburgsche Commercie Compagnie.

== Spoors & Sprenger company ==
Johan Valentijn and father-in-law Adriaan together founded the firm Spoors & Sprenger. Spoors himself was also active in the purchase and sale of plantations as what now would be known as a business doctor. He bought loss-making plantations to restructure them and sold them within a few years with profit. Spoors & Sprenger were both engaged in the triangular-trade (slave trade) to Africa as well as the bilateral trade to West-India. In addition to trading in people the firm also traded in gunpowder, cotton, beads, weapons and liquor (to Africa) and products like coffee, cocoa, sugar, tobacco, letter wood and indigo from West-India to the Dutch Republic. The firm Spoors & Sprenger competed strongly with the Society for Navigation on Essequibo and adjacent Rivers (1771–1788) in the colonies of Essequibo, Demerary and Berbice and at one point had six slave ships in service at the same time. Spoors & Sprenger initially managed to compete strongly because the average sail time of the slave ships of the SNER was 333 days, compared to 292 days for the ships of Spoors & Sprenger to Essequibo. Adriaan Spoors especially had strong family ties within the Dutch West India Company and in political circles. Johan Valentijn Sprenger became commissioner of the States of Zeeland and was also mayor of Middelburg. However, due to disappointing financial results, Johan Valentijn Sprenger had to apply for a suspension of payments for the firm on 18 January 1781.

== Company buildings and archive ==
The company was located on the south side of the Dam in Middelburg, a square close to the harbor entrance. From there contacts were maintained with the overseas areas. The company also owned a warehouse on the Kousteensedijk (nowadays nr. 22), which Adriaan Spoors had established in 1735. The company's archive contains correspondence, diaries, drawings and other documents that are of great importance to the history of the plantations and the Africans who were forced into slavery there. In addition to the business documents, the archive contains documents about daily life in the colony. For example, the archive contains a journal by Gerard Jacob Sprenger form 1928 about a trip to the waterfalls in the Essequibo and Mazaruni rivers. The archive also contains documents that deal with the course of events in Essequibo, the involvement of the family and daily life, cash books and other financial matters.

== Sources ==
=== Literature ===
- Ruud Paesie, 'De 'Societeyt ter Navigatie op Essequebo en annexe Rivieren' op- en ondergang van een Zeeuwse rederij', in: Maurits Ebben, Henk den Heijer en Joost Schokkenbroek (red.), Alle streken van het kompas. Maritieme geschiedenis in Nederland (Zutphen, 2010) 295–316.
- Ruud Paesie, Sociëteit van Essequebo. Op- en ondergang van een coöperatieve scheepvaartonderneming, 1771-1788 (Flushing, 2017).
- Ianthe Sahadat, Elsbeth Stoker, Fleur de Weerd, 'Dit is zo groot, dit is niet te herstellen', interview with Jochem Sprenger, in: De Volkskrant, 20 April 2022. Consulted, 1 October 2024.

=== Archival sources ===
Zeeuws Archief, Middelburg

1752 Families Spoors and Sprenger, (1634) 1695–1945

- 1.2 Papers concerning the colony of Surinam, inv.nrs. 2–5.
- 1.3 Papers concerning several plantations, inv.nrs. 6–15.
- 1.4 Drawings of possessions in the West-Indies, inv.nrs. 16–20.
- 1.5 Papers concerning the Middelburgsche Commercie Compagnie, inv.nrs. 21–23.
- 1.6 Miscellanea, inv.nr. 25.
- 2.3 Papers concerning Gerard Jacob Sprenger (1806–1878), inv.nrs. 40, 60.
- 3.2 Papers concerning the family Spoors and related genera, correspondence, inv.nrs. 68–77.

301 Family Sprenger, 1771–1974

- inv.nrs. 2-3 Statement containing the list of mines near Marienburg and shares in this company.
- inv.nr. 4 Deed of suspension of payment, 18 January 1781.

National Archives, Kew

- 5 letters from and to Spoors & Sprenger, 1780.
