= Snouck Hurgronje & Louijsse =

Trade company in the Netherlands

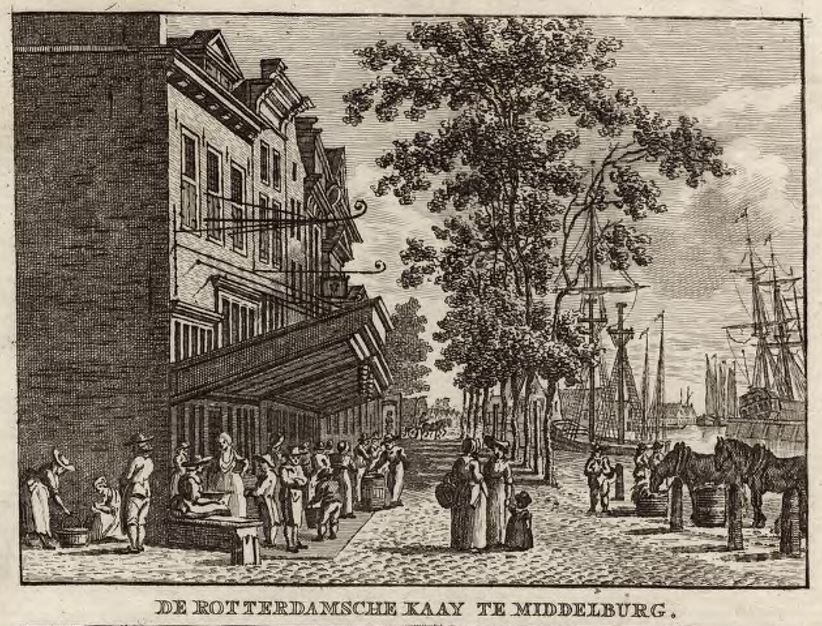
- The Rotterdamsekaai in Middelburg where Snouck Hurgronje & Louijsse held office in 1782, copper engraving by K.F. Bendorp, approx. 1790, source: Zeeuws Archief, KZGW, ZI II, nr. 0281
- Type: Chartered company
- Industry: Slave trade, Ivory trade, Textile trade, Interloping
- Predecessor: Johannes Louijsse & Zoon
- Founded: 1766; 260 years ago
- Founders: Steven Matthijs Snouck Hurgronje and Abraham Louijsse
- Defunct: 1788; 238 years ago
- Successor: Johannes Louijsse & Zoon
- Headquarters: Rotterdamsekaai, Middelburg and Nieuwendijk, Flushing, The Dutch Republic

Snouck Hurgronje & Louijsse was a Dutch trading company founded by Steven Matthijs Snouck Hurgronje and Abraham Louijsse in 1766 and dissolved in 1788. It focused on textiles, ivory, the slave trade, and smuggling.

== Abraham Louijsse ==
Abraham Louijsse (1741–1805) was the grandson of Abraham Louijsse senior and son of honorary pensioner Johannes Louijsse (1711–1793), who was also chairman of the Zeeuwsch Genootschap der Wetenschappen (Zeeland Society of Sciences). Abraham was married to Anna Maria van Wingerden. As regent, he was a patron of the hospital for men and women, owned several plantations in Surinam and was alderman and councillor of Flushing (1769–1770, 1786). He played an important role in the celebration of the second centenary of the Revolt against the Spanish in the city (6 April 1572). Because he was a patriot, the windows of one of his houses were smashed during the Orange uprising of 1787. Until 1779 he lived on the corner of what was then Pottekaai (the current Wilhelminastraat) and the Nieuwstraat. From 1786 onwards he lived three houses further than his original address, at number 21. Abraham Louijsse prevented a plundering of Flushing when Orange-minded sailors from the navy attacked the invading French. By granting the province an interest-free advance of a ton of gold, the sailors could be paid their wages and provided with travel money. Shortly afterwards, the trading company of Johannes Louijsse & Zoon collapsed.

== Steven Matthijs Snouck Hurgronje ==
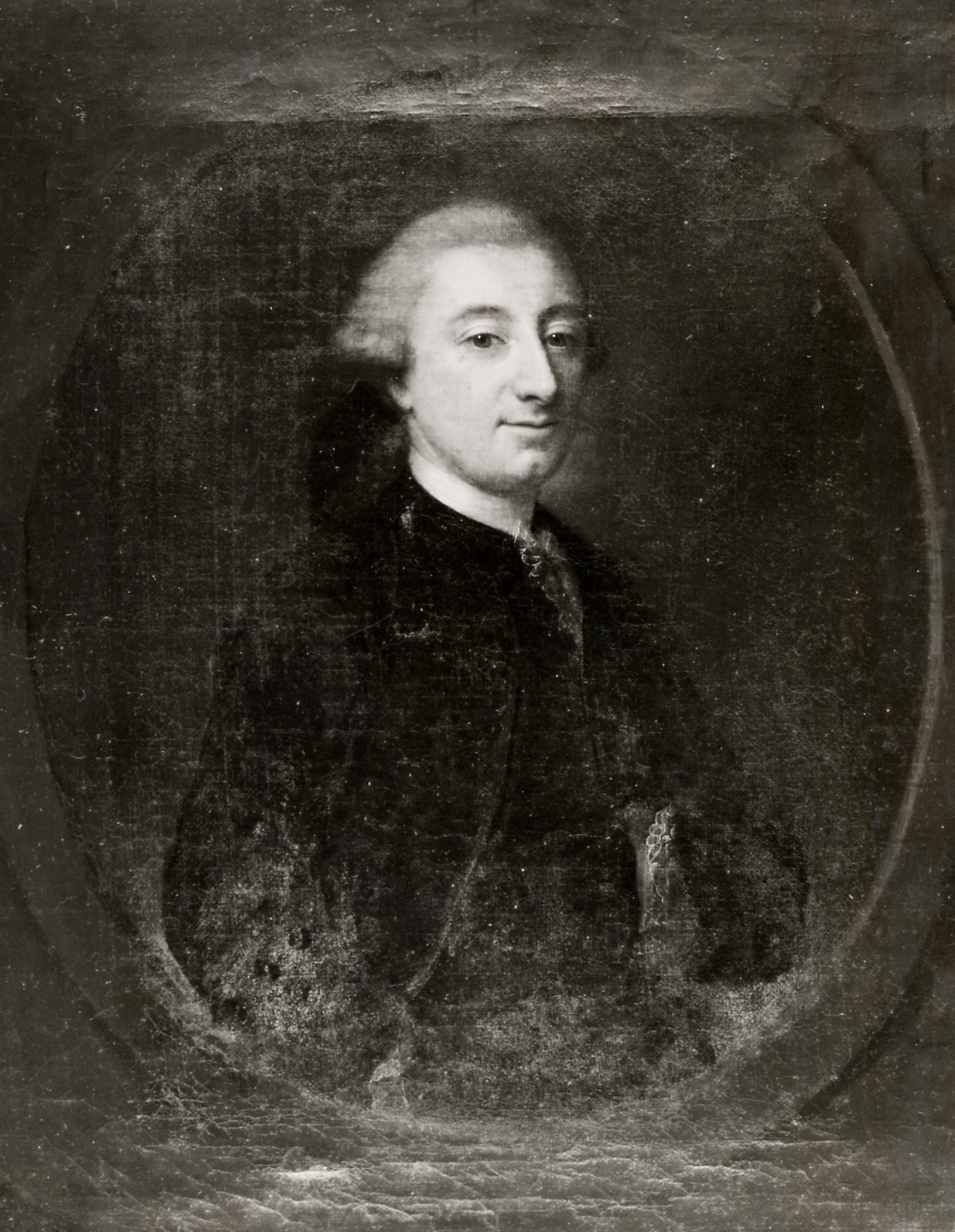
Portrait of Steven Matthijs Snouck Hurgronje (1741–1788), oil painting by an unknown painter, source: "Zeeuws Archief", Photocollection Flushing, nr. 15665.

Steven Matthijs Snouck Hurgronje (Flushing, 18 October 1741 – Middelburg, 29 January 1788) was shipowner, councillor (1770–1776, 1779–1780, 1783–1784, 1786), alderman (1777–1778, 1781–1782) and treasurer (1780) of Middelburg. He lived in the Lange Singelstraat. In 1762 he changed his name from Hurgronje to Snouck Hurgronje and on 4 September 1766, he married Anna Catharina Elias in Middelburg (after whom he also named a ship). The couple had two children: Jacob Lodewijk (1778–1845) and Adriaan Isaac (1780–1849), but he may have had three more children. Steven Matthijs Snouck Hurgronje was director of the Zeeland Chamber of the Dutch East India Company from 1780 to 1788. He also was director of the Sociëteit ter Navigatie op Essequebo en annexe Rivieren from 1772 to 1780 (SNER) in which he owned 3,000 guilders worth of shares and he wrote the philosophical thesis De calculo Minervae (Delft, 1758). During the years that he lived in Flushing he owned a house on the Nieuwe Timmerwerf, near the Dock. The activities of the company of Snouck Hurgronje & Abraham Louijsse took place in Flushing from around 1766, but were moved to Middelburg in the autumn of 1780. Six years later, in 1786, the company moved back to Flushing, which gave a boost to the economy of the city.

== Trade Company of Snouck Hurgronje & Louijsse ==
For slave traders, it was very important to know which products were wanted in Africa. Snouck Hurgronje & Louijsse were specialists when it came to knowledge about the textile trade to Africa. The export to Africa could be divided into seven goods: guns, gunpowder, textiles, alcoholic beverages, pottery and glass, copper and iron and knives, beads and some other products. A lot of gunpowder and weapons were taken to Guinea, while much more textiles were taken to Loango-Angola. The MCC often bought textiles at the VOC autumn auctions, but also did this from private individuals. Some of them were involved in both textile sales and the slave trade. Snouck Hurgronje & Louijsse, for example, supplied textiles and traded themselves mainly on the Loango-Angola coast, where textiles were important commodities. The company bought textiles in both England and France. The trading company Snouck Hurgronje & Louijsse also engaged in interloping on the West. Around 1765, the firm Bengers & Zoon acted as a trading agent for the MCC from St. Eustatius. They also operated on behalf of Snouck Hurgronje & Louijsse. The American Revolution caused a great demand for weapons and ammunition, which were first obtained in the Dutch Republic and then were shipped via West Africa and St. Eustatius. The Walcheren gunpowder mill Eendracht (Unity) increased its production from 170,848 pounds in 1776 to 367,535 pounds in 1779. Snouck Hurgronje & Louijsse from Flushing in 1777 shipped 3,000 barrels of gunpowder and 750 firearms to St. Eustatius in the ship Hoop (Hope), and on 7 June 1784, immediately after the end of the Fourth Anglo-Dutch War, they bought another 34,236 pounds of gunpowder from the Zeeland Admiralty.

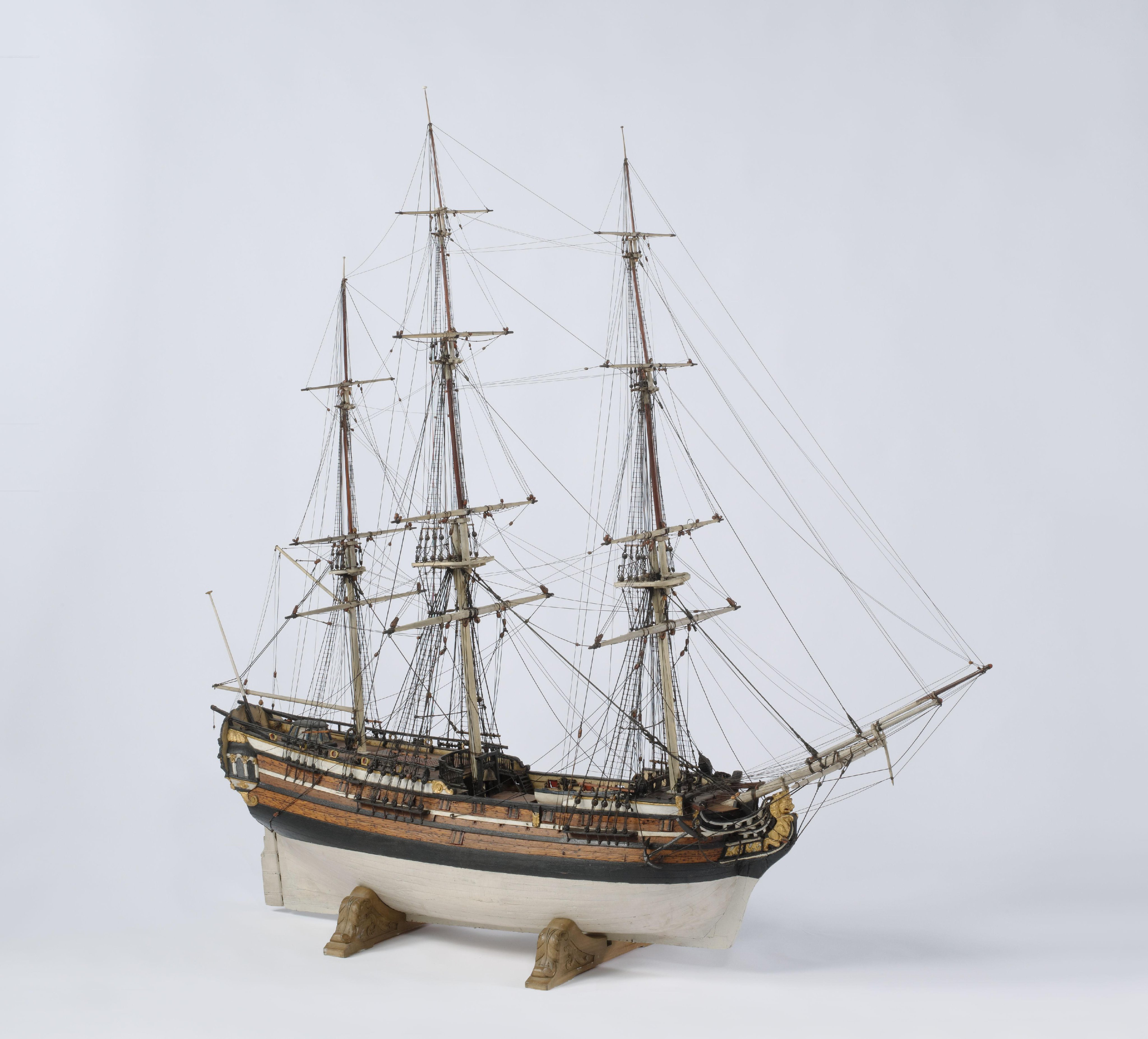
Ships model of the slave trader De Witte Oliphant (the White Elephant), approx. 1755, Rijksmuseum, Amsterdam, object nr. NG-MC-1210

== Slave trade ==
In addition to slave trade, Snouck Hurgronje & Louijsse were involved in all kinds of activities. In 1766 they equipped their first slave ship. Both built up a fleet of several ships and in the following decade focused on the slave trade with Loango-Angola. In addition, they bought textiles for the slave voyages, but they also supplied this to other Walcheren companies.

The company of Snouck Hurgronje & Louijsse undertook a total of 32 registered slave voyages. During 30 voyages 8,426 captives were transported across the Atlantic Ocean, bringing the estimated total to 11,235 for the company. After Snouck Hurgronje died, Abraham Louijsse continued these activities together with Jan Swart under the name Johannes Louijsse & Zoon.

Slave voyages equipped by Snouck Hurgronje & Louijsse, 1767–1788

Nr.	Year	ID voyage	Ship	Captain	Departure	Purchase	Destination	People sold
1	1767	10839	Maria	Jansen, Jan	Flushing	Malembo	Surinam	269
2	1769	10840	Maria	Jansen, Jan	Flushing	Congo	Surinam	210
3	1770	10428	Anna en Catharina	Heere, C.M. de	Flushing	Africa	Surinam	276
4	1770	10671	Herstelder	Stap, Pieter	Flushing	Congo	Essequebo	unknown
5	1771	10841	Maria	Jansen, Jan	Flushing	Congo	Surinam	250
6	1771	11101	Vlissingse Hoofdnegotie	Dankers, Joost	Flushing	'Windward Coast', Ivory Coast, Gold Coast, Benin	Essequebo	280
7	1772	10429	Anna en Catharina	Stuurling, Laurens	Flushing	Malembo	America	unknown
8	1772	10672	Herstelder	Stap, Pieter	Flushing	Elmina	Surinam	300
9	1772	10842	Maria	Jansen, Jan	Flushing	Cabinda	Surinam	260
10	1773	10430	Anna en Catharina	Stuurling, Laurens	Flushing	Malembo	Caribbean Sea	unknown
11	1773	10795	Lammerenburg	Noels, Andries	Flushing	Ivory Coast, Gold Coast, Benin	Surinam	210
12	1774	10843	Maria	Pieters, Carel	Flushing	Congo	Curaçao	260
13	1774	10995	Sara Suzanna Maria	Dankers, Joost	Flushing	'Windward Coast', Ivory Coast, Gold Coast, Benin	Curaçao	300
14	1775	10844	Maria	Pieters, Carel	Flushing	Congo	St. Eustatius	280
15	1775	10431	Anna en Catharina	Stuurling, Laurens	Flushing	Congo	Demerara	230
16	1775	10796	Lammerenburg	Noels, Andries	Flushing	"Windward Coast", Bight of Biafra, Gulf of Guinea	America	150
17	1777	10996	Sara Suzanna Maria	Dankers, Joost	Flushing	'Windward Coast', Ivory Coast, Gold Coast, Benin	Surinam	300
18	1778	10845	Maria	Pieters, Carel	Flushing	'Windward Coast', Ivory Coast, Gold Coast, Benin	Essequebo	200
19	1779	10682	Hoop	Magnus, Carel en Dankers, Joost	Flushing	'Windward Coast'	Essequebo	200
20	1779	11068	Verwachting	Noels, Andries	Flushing	'Windward Coast', Ivory Coast, Gold Coast, Benin	St. Eustatius	300
21	1780	10901	Jonge Nicolaas Jan	Reichtert, Frans, Breedau, Carel	Flushing	Cape Coast Castle	Essequebo	unknown
22	1780	10997	Sara Suzanna Maria	Dankers, Joost	Flushing	'Windward Coast', Ivory Coast, Gold Coast, Benin	Surinam	348
23	1780	11142	Westcapelle	Moelaart, Gijsbrecht	Flushing	Congo	St. Eustatius	443
24	1781	10536	Eendracht	Udemans, Pieter Gideon	Flushing	'Windward Coast', Ivory Coast, Gold Coast, Benin	unknown	unknown
25	1782	11110	Vrijheid	Pieters, Carel	Flushing	Africa	Demerara	unknown
26	1784	10902	Jonge Nicolaas Jan	Magnus, Carel	Flushing	Elmina	Demerara	180
27	1785	10683	Hoop	Udemans, Pieter Gideon	Flushing	Elmina	Surinam	300
28	1785	11181	Zeefortuin	Baas, Isaac den, Muijen, Cornelis van	Flushing	Elmina	Demerara	215
29	1785	11070	Verwachting	Noels, Andries	Flushing	Elmina	Demerara	unknown
30	1787	10613	Goede Hoop	Muijen, Cornelis van	Zeeland	Africa	Demerara	427
31	1787	11077	Vigilantie	Dankers, Joost	Flushing	Congo	America	300
32	1788	11185	Zeenimph	Pieters, Carel	Flushing	Africa	Demerara	350

Slave voyages equipped after the death of Snouck Hurgronje (1788) in company with Jan Swart under the name of Johannes Louijsse & Zoon, 1789–1793

Nr.	Year	ID voyage	Ship	Captain	Departure	Purchase	Destination	People sold
33	1789	11701	Verwachting	Moelaart, Gijsbrecht	Flushing	Elmina	Demerara	301
34	1790	10614	Goede Hoop	Muijen, Cornelis van	Rotterdam	Elmina	unknown	unknown
35	1791	11078	Vigilantie	Sellow, C. van	Flushing	'Windward Coast', Ivory Coast, Gold Coast, Benin	America	unknown
36	1791	11072	Verwachting	Moelaart, Gijsbrecht	Flushing	Congo	America	300
37	1791	10611	Goed Voornemen	Tol, Casper	Amsterdam	Elmina	Surinam	276
38	1791	11186	Zeenimph	Pieters, Carel	Flushing	Congo	Demerara	379
39	1793	11079	Vigilantie	Sellow, C. van	Flushing	Elmina	Spanish Caribbean	294
40	1793	10612	Goed Voornemen	Tol, Casper	Zeeland	Elmina	Surinam	308

Source for both tables: Slave Voyages.org, consulted March 3–4, 2025; Postma, The Dutch in the Atlantic Slave Trade 1600-1815, passim; Priester, De Nederlandse houding ten aanzien van de slavenhandel en slavernij, 1596-1863, passim; The National Archives, Kew, HCA 30, inv.nr. 321, Attestation Carel Breedau, 28 August 1780.

== Company buildings ==
Abraham Louijsse owned a barley- and hulling mill that he had founded in 1771 together with broker, shipowner and slave trader Jan van der Woordt. This was sold again in 1775. Together with his father he operated the trading company Johannes Louijsse & Zoon. A firm that was probably already active in Flushing before 1780. In 1782 however, the office operated from a building on the Rotterdamsekaai in Middelburg. During the Fourth Anglo-Dutch War (1780–1784) this trading company maintained interloping affairs with Great Britain in tobacco and gin. In addition to their shipping activities, Snouck Hurgronje & Louijsse were joint accountants for the Flushing gunpowder mill Zeefortuin (Sea Fortune). The trading company was also active in the ivory trade. Johannes Louijsse was even considered an expert in the field of ivory. From September 1779, the company owned an ivory comb- and ivory turning company', where the ivory imported from Guinea was processed into various objects. The ivory trade by Johannes Louijsse & Zoon had existed for some time, and by far the most ivory was not processed in the factory but traded immediately. After Snouck Hurgronje's death in 1788, the slave trade activities were brought under the flag of Johannes Louijsse & Zoon. Steven Matthijs and Abraham Louijsse had bought a warehouse together on the Nieuwedijk in Flushing on 17 June 1766, for forty Pound Flemish (240 guilders). The seller of this house was John Rainbard.

== Sources ==
=== Literature ===
- Victor Enthoven, 'That abominable nest of Pirates. St. Eustatius and the North Americans, 1680-1780', in: Early American Studies 10/2 (2012) 264–290.
- Johan Francke, 'Deesen zaak dient … in allen opzigten op het secreetsten gehouden te worden.' Het plan van Hogguer & De Galz voor een illegale slavenreis via Angola naar Saint-Domingue (1781) (Zoutelande, 2020).
- ___________ , 'Al die willen te kaap'ren varen.' De Nederlandse commissievaart tijdens de Vierde Engelse Oorlog, 1780-1784 (Zutphen 2019).
- Wim Klooster, Illicit Riches. Dutch trade in the Caribbean 1648-1795 (Leiden, 1998).
- Gerhard de Kok, Walcherse ketens. De trans-Atlantische slavenhandel en de economie van Walcheren, 1755–1780. Phd thesis Leiden University ([S.l.], 2019).
- Ruud Paesie, Societeyt van Essequebo. Op- en ondergang van een coöperatieve scheepvaartonderneming, 1771-1788 (Flushing, 2017).
- Johannes Menne Postma, The Dutch in the Atlantic Slave Trade 1600-1815 (Cambridge, 1990).
- L.R. Priester, De Nederlandse houding ten aanzien van de slavenhandel en slavernij, 1596–1863. Het gedrag van de slavenhandelaren van de Commercie Compagnie van Middelburg in de 18e eeuw (Middelburg, 1987).

=== Sites ===
- Slave Voyages.org. Consulted March 3–4, 2025.

=== Archival material ===
Zeeuws Archief, Middelburg (the Netherlands)

- 98 Family Snouck Hurgronje, 1641-1943
  - 1.1.3 Steven Matthijs (Snouck) Hurgronje (1741-1788) and Anna Catharina Elias (1746-1796), inv. nrs. 63-75.
    - Afdeling II
  - 6 Steven Matthijs Snouck Hurgronje (1741-1788), inv. nrs. 225-235.
- 508 Rekenkamer C
- 511 Rekenkamer D

National Archives, Kew (UK).

- Zee(uw)post, there: TNA, HCA 30, inv.nrs. 321, 339-340, 352, 6 letters of and from Steven Matthijs Snouck Hurgronje and/or Abraham Louijsse, September 1780 – January 1781 and attestation Carel Breedau, 28 August 1780.

Content in this edit is translated from the original Dutch article at: nl:Snouck Hurgronje & Louijsse; see its history for attribution.
