= Perusahaan Perdagangan Indonesia =

Indonesian trading company

PT Perusahaan Perdagangan Indonesia (Persero)
- Company type: State-Owned Enterprise
- Industry: Trading company
- Founded: 31 March 2003
- Headquarters: GRAHA PPI, Jalan Abdul Muis 8, Central Jakarta, Jakarta, 10160 Indonesia
- Parent: PT Rajawali Nusantara Indonesia
- Website: www.ptppi.co.id/en/

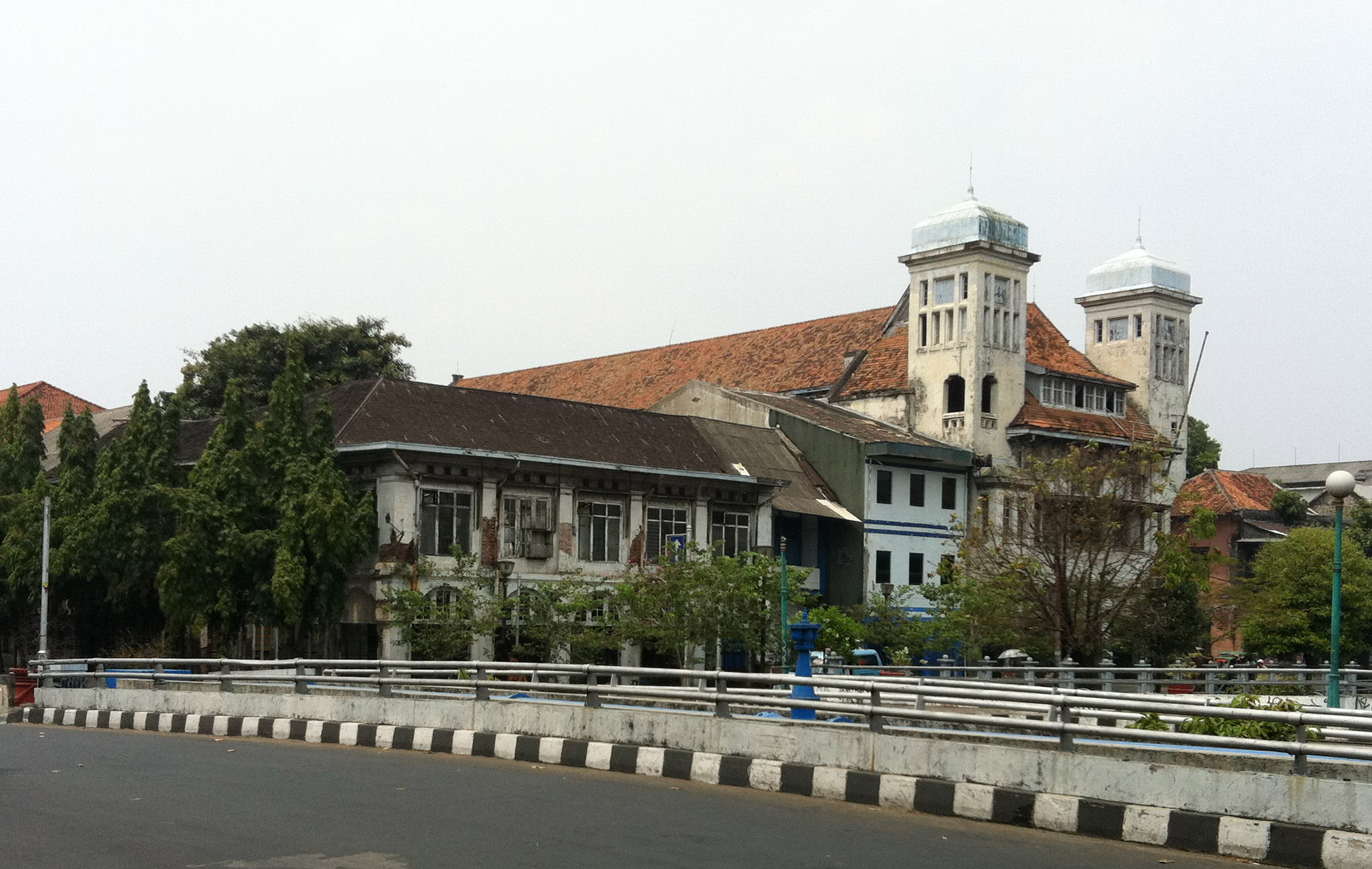
Former PT Tjipta Niaga head office in Jakarta (picture taken in 2011)

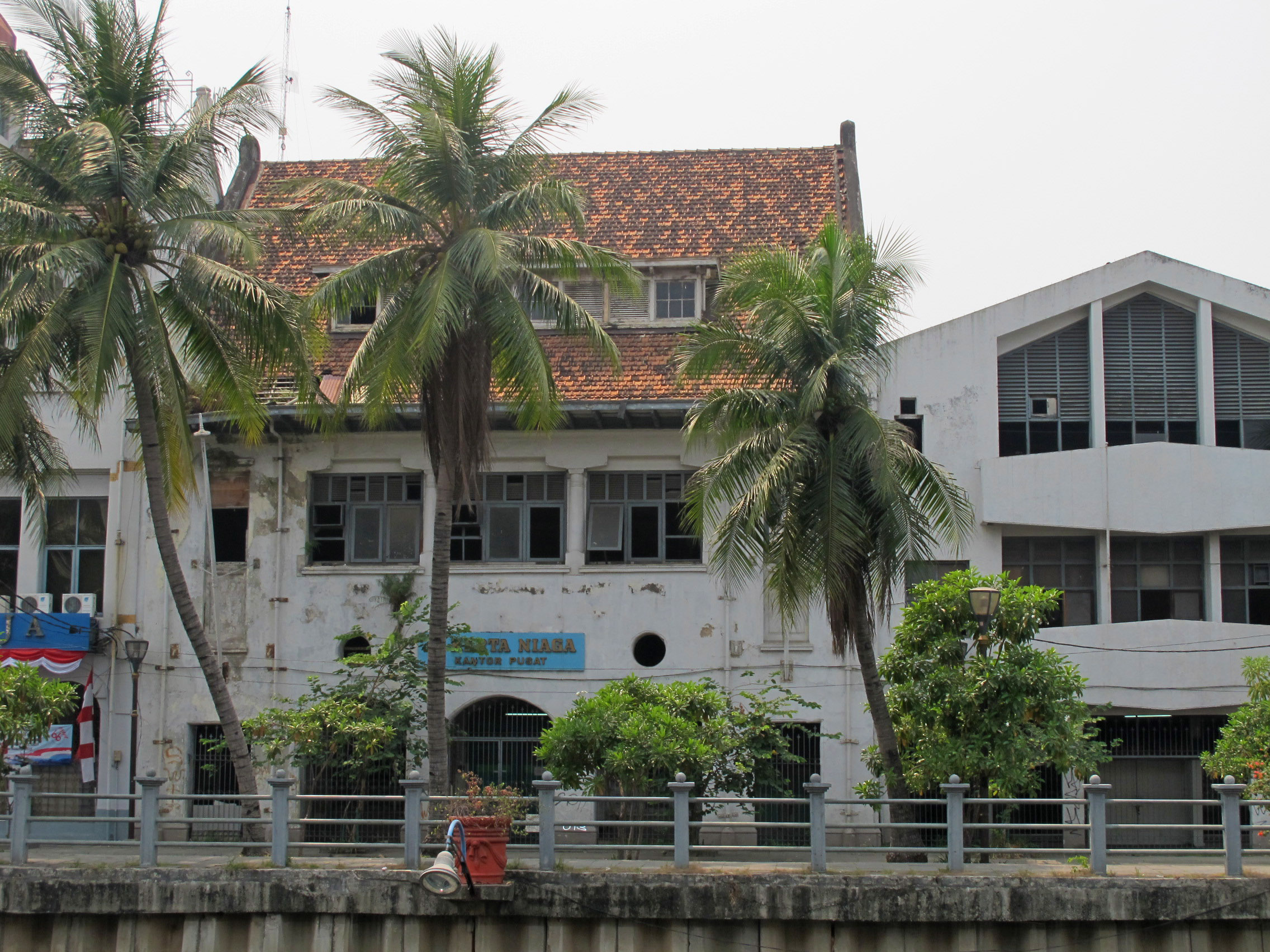
Head office of PT Kerta Niaga (merged into PT Dharma Niaga) in Jakarta (picture taken in 2011)

PT Perusahaan Perdagangan Indonesia (Persero) (lit. 'Indonesia Trading Company'), or PPI, is the only Indonesian state-owned trading house. Its business is in export, import and distribution.

PPI was formed through the merger of three former so-called "Niaga" companies, state-owned trading companies PT Tjipta Niaga, PT Dharma Niaga and PT Pantja Niaga, on 31 March 2003.

These three ex-"Niaga" belonged to the so-called "Big Five" of the colonial period of the Netherlands Indies, which were nationalized in the 1950s.

PPI's main activities is in general trading, including export, import and distribution of :

- Industrial products:
  - Construction materials (cement, asphalt, steel products, other metal products),
  - Agricultural product (staples, spices, forest and fishery products),
  - Chemicals (fertilizers, pesticides, hazardous chemicals and pharmaceuticals),
  - Machinery and equipment (medical equipment, agricultural equipment, heavy equipment, vehicles).
- Consumer products:
  - Product of various brands, in particular Unilever),
  - Food and beverage (in particular alcoholic drinks, as official importer appointed by the Indonesian government).

PPI employs some 1,200 people and has offices all over Indonesia.

== See also ==
- List of trading companies

== Sources ==
- https://cepiar.wordpress.com

Palm Oil Trading Indonesia
