= Guinea Company of Scotland =

Short-lived Scottish trading company

The Guinea Company of Scotland was a short-lived Scottish trading company, active during the 1630s. It was granted a royal monopoly over the trade with West Africa by Charles I, modelled on the existing English Guinea Company, with which it unofficially co-operated. The company made only a single voyage, of two ships; one returned, whilst the other was seized by Portuguese forces at São Tomé and its crew killed. Following this, the company made some attempts to recover compensation for the second ship, but without any success, and ceased to operate sometime around 1639. There was no further attempt by Scotland to trade with Africa on an organised basis until the formation of the Company of Scotland Trading to Africa and the Indies in 1695.

== Background ==
The Scottish government had made no organised attempts to support colonisation or trade with the "new world" throughout the sixteenth century, and only began to make limited attempts in the early seventeenth. The first major overseas venture was in the North Atlantic fisheries in 1617, which failed, and an attempt to colonise Nova Scotia and Cape Breton in the 1620s, likewise unsuccessful.

== Activity ==
The first and only voyage funded by the Company left Britain in late 1636, with two ships, and in the spring of 1637 attempted to trade on the Gold Coast. One ship returned home later in the year with a small cargo, giving an approximate profit of around 50% on its cargo, whilst the second had remained to trade, accumulating around £10,000 sterling in gold. Returning home in September, it put into the Portuguese colony of São Tomé for repairs, where it was treated as hostile; the ship and cargo were seized, whilst most of the crew was killed.

== Aftermath ==
The Company did not mount a second voyage; attempts to gain compensation for the loss of the ship were sidetracked by political unrest in both countries, in the form of the Portuguese Restoration War and the Wars of the Three Kingdoms.
