= State Trading Corporation =

Indian state-owned trading company

State Trading Corporation of India Ltd.
- Company type: Public
- Traded as: NSE: STCINDIA; BSE: 512531
- Founded: 1956

The State Trading Corporation of India Ltd is an Indian government-owned international trading company established in 1956, responsible for managing import and export operations. It functions as an independent entity under the Companies Act, 1956, and operates under the administrative jurisdiction of the Ministry of Commerce & Industry.

== History ==
In 1956, the government established the State Trading Corporation of India to engage in trade with East European countries. In 1971, STC formed a subsidiary known as PEC India (formerly Project and Equipment Corporation of India Ltd.) to oversee the export of railway and engineering equipment, which commenced operations on October 1, 1963. As STC expanded, it recognized the importance of mineral and metal exports in India's Five Year Plans. Consequently, the government decided to separate STC and establish a dedicated corporation focused solely on mineral and metal trade. In 1997, PEC became an independent entity.

STC diversified its trading portfolio, including the export of various products such as agricultural commodities (e.g., wheat and rice) and essential goods (e.g., sugar and pulses). The company also ventured into the hydrocarbon sector by supplying coal to state electricity boards and importing kerosene.

STC entered into a memorandum of understanding (MoU) with NAFED, an agricultural cooperative, for the export of agricultural commodities to the Republic of Mauritius through a government-to-government arrangement.

However, in September 2019, Trade Minister Piyush Goyal announced the impending closure of STC due to a severe liquidity crisis, as detailed in STC's 2018-19 Annual Report. The crisis stemmed from the classification of STC's account as a bad loan by lending banks due to non-payment of interest on the company's availed banking limits. Consequently, STC halted all payments except salaries to its employees, underscoring the gravity of its financial predicament.

== Merger proposal ==
Commerce and Industry Minister Suresh Prabhu mentioned that a merger of MMTC and STC was under consideration to streamline operations and eliminate overlaps.

However, it was later decided not to proceed with the merger proposal, as it was deemed unlikely to be beneficial. The merger would have resulted in synergies between overlapping operations, and the government would have borne the expenses for voluntary retirement schemes for employees.
