= South Cameroon Company =

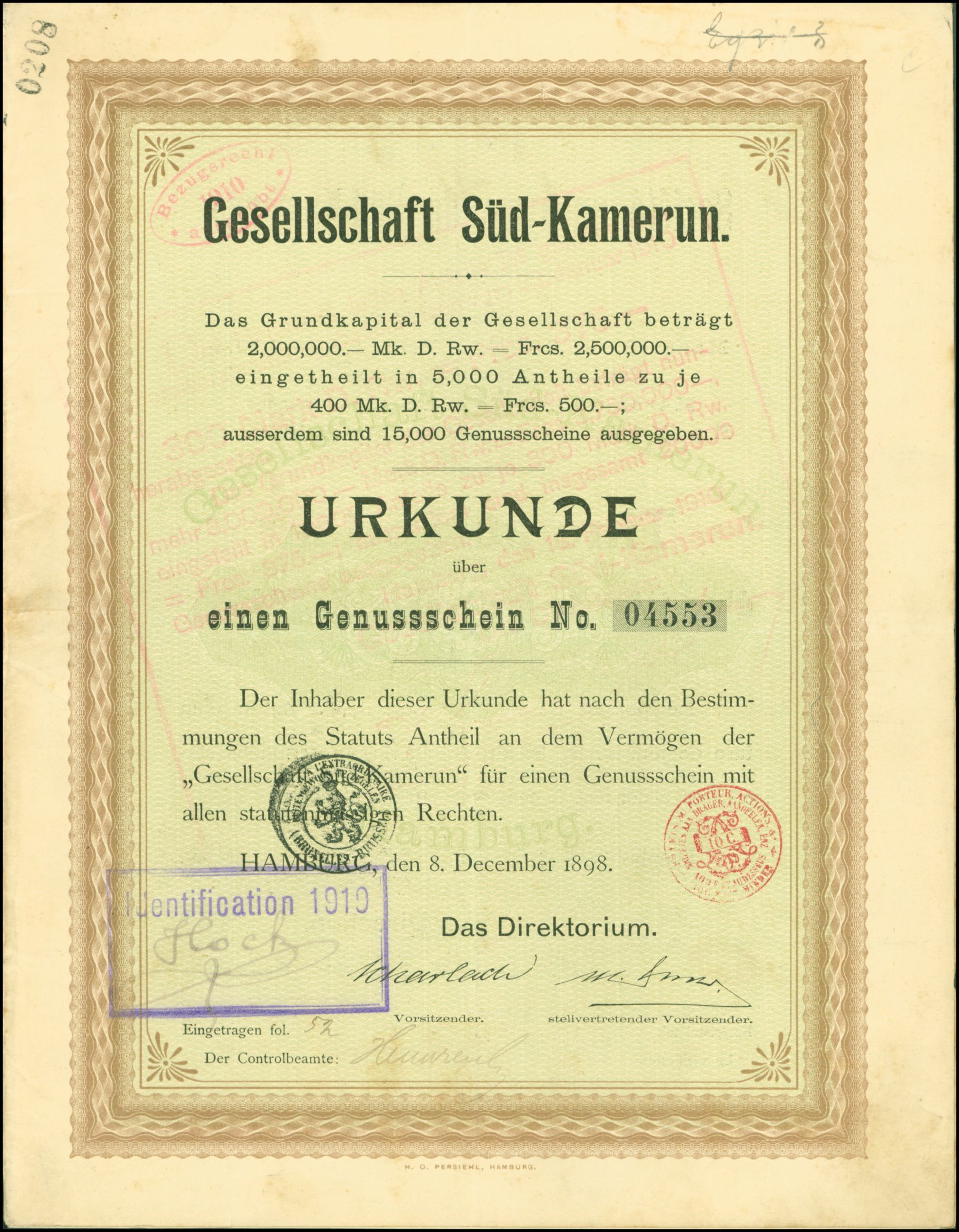
Participation certificate of the Gesellschaft Süd-Kamerun, issued 8. December 1898

The Gesellschaft Süd-Kamerun (German: South Cameroon Company) was a private trading corporation formed in 1898, facilitated by governor Jesko von Puttkamer, to run the rubber and ivory trade in the southeast of the German colony of Kamerun.

== See also ==
- List of trading companies

== See also ==
- Gesellschaft Nordwest-Kamerun
