= Antoni Protazy Potocki =

Polish nobleman and entrepreneur (1761–1801)

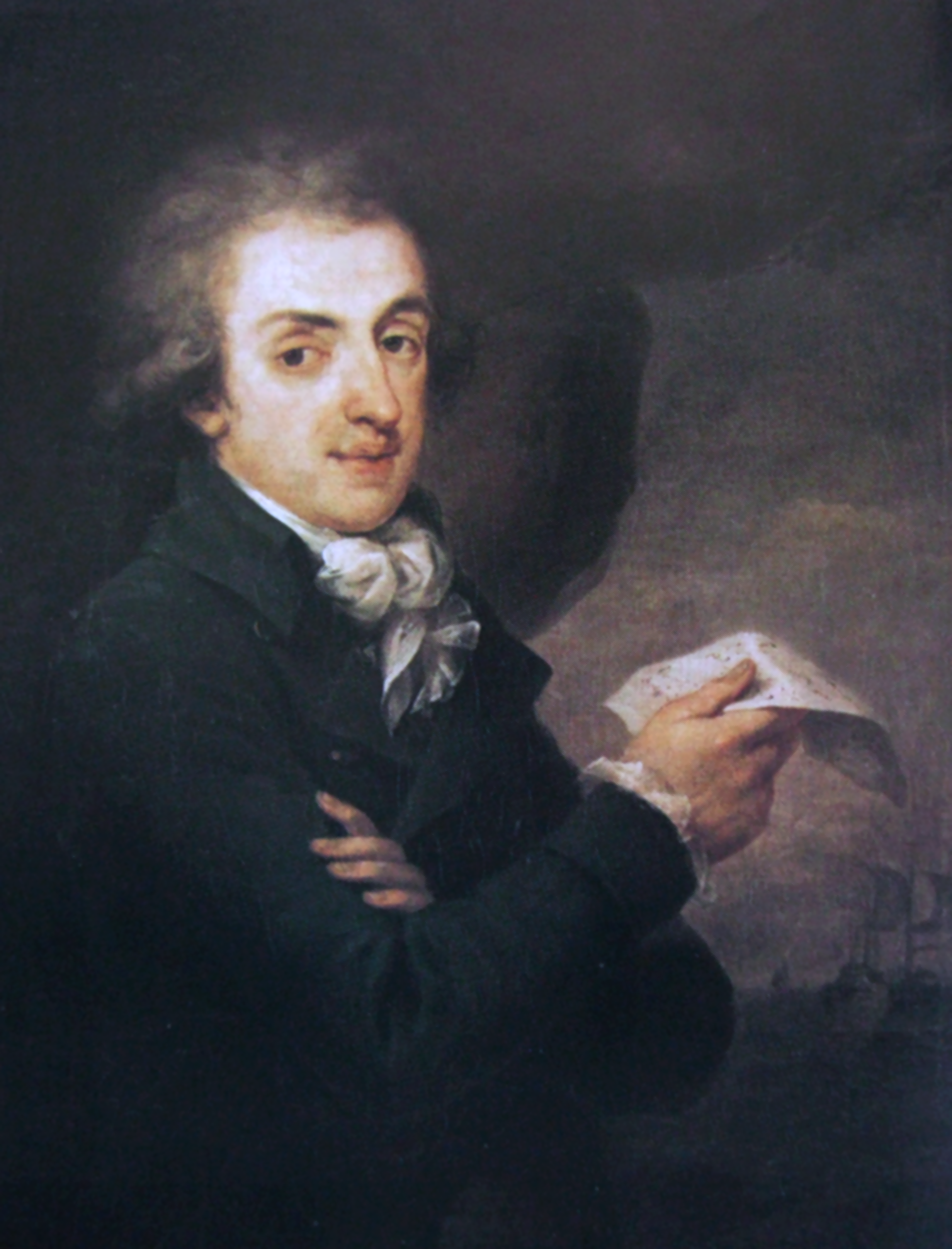
- Portrait by Josef Grassi, 1792
- Coat of arms: Piława
- Born: 11 September 1761; Guzów near Skierniewice
- Died: 1801 (aged 39–40)
- Family: Potocki
- Spouse: Marianna Lubomirska
- Issue: Emilia Potocka
- Father: Jan Prosper Potocki
- Mother: Paula Szembek

Antoni Protazy Potocki (11 September 1761 – 1801), also known as Prot, was a Polish nobleman and an early entrepreneur.

== Biography ==
He was born to Paula née Szembek and her second husband, Count Jan Prosper Potocki, Starosta of Guzów. He was a younger half-brother of Feliks Lubienski and older half-brother of Michal Kleofas Oginski and his sister, Józefa Ogińska.

In 1790 Antoni bought himself voivodeship of Kiev, approved in 1791 by King and briefly he was starost of Guzów. He was a banker in Kherson and Warsaw.

As proprietor of the Chudniv estate, he established several factories in the village of Makhnivka, near Berdychiv. He was director the Polish Black Sea Trading Company, and ran an import-export business in Russian-ruled Kherson. Potocki had inherited wealth from his father: 6 million zlotys and a number of estates. His marriage with Marianna Lubomirska, daughter of magnate Kasper Lubomirski, contributed still more. At the peak of his wealth, in early 1790s, his fortune was estimated 60-70 million zlotys. However political turmoils brought his (and many other wealthy Polish businessmen) fortune to the end. The first strike was the first partition of Poland, during which people rushed to banks for money, and many banks, including Potocki's, crashed. He was on the way to recovery, but the second political blow followed: the Kościuszko Uprising of 1794. Eventually much of the remaining fortune and estates were lost due to unpaid taxes. The knowledge of his last days in oblivion is fragmentary.

He was invested as a Knight of the Order of the White Eagle, awarded on May 8, 1781. Later he was awarded with the Order of Saint Stanislaus.
