= Roosevelt Institute for American Studies =

Research institute in the Netherlands

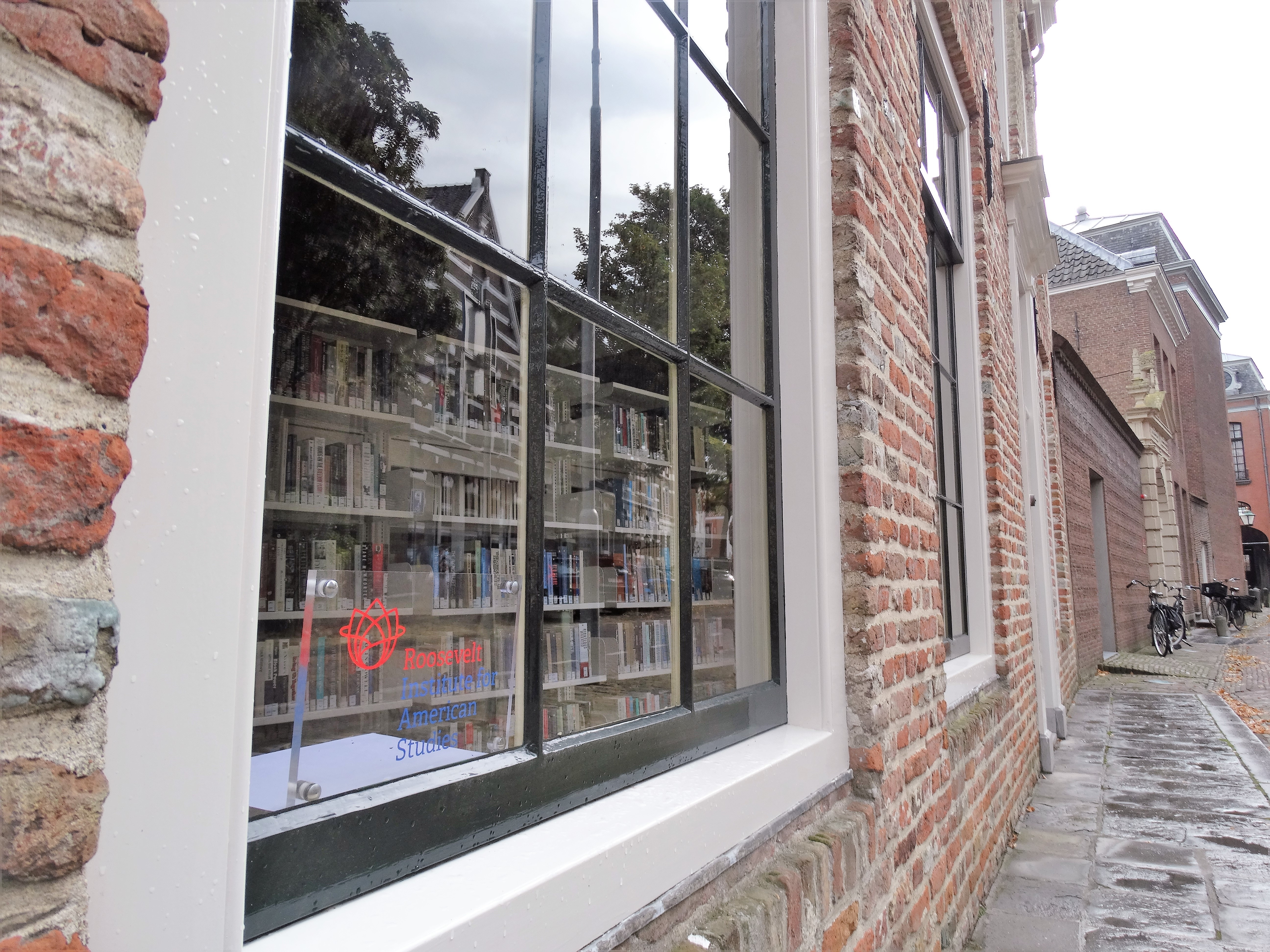
Streetview towards the library

The Roosevelt Institute for American Studies (RIAS) is a research institute, graduate school, conference center, and library for the study of US history and transatlantic relations in the modern era located in Zeeuws Archief, in Middelburg, the Netherlands. Up to 2017, it was known as the Roosevelt Study Center. The Institute is named after three famous Americans, whose ancestors emigrated from Zeeland, the Netherlands, to the United States in the seventeenth century: President Theodore Roosevelt (1858–1919), President Franklin D. Roosevelt (1882–1945), and Eleanor Roosevelt (1884–1962).

== History and activities ==
The roots of the Institute date back to 1982, when Arthur M. Schlesinger Jr., noted American historian, and William J. vanden Heuvel, president of the Roosevelt Institute in Hyde Park, New York, launched the initiative to establish a European research facility specialized in twentieth-century American history in Middelburg, the capital of Zeeland. Their initiative, discussed with the Provincial Government of Zeeland in the years 1982–1984, resulted in the opening of the Roosevelt Study Center in 1986.

In 2016, 30 years after its founding, the Center entered into a partnership with the University of Leiden. Consequently, the Center was renamed to the Roosevelt Institute for American Studies, and acquired a new set of activities, including the establishment of a graduate school for US history. The RIAS is subsidized by the Provincial Government of Zeeland and the Ministry of Education, Culture, and Science. Private corporations and institutions sponsor particular programs of the RIAS.

The RIAS cooperates with Dutch universities in research projects, as well as with the Theodore Roosevelt Association and the Franklin and Eleanor Roosevelt Institute in various ways. The center, for instance, annually awards the best Master Thesis on American History with the Theodore Roosevelt American History Award (TRAHA), which grants the winner a trip to the key sites of interest of the Roosevelts.

The RIAS regularly organizes and hosts conferences and lectures on U.S. history and culture and on European-U.S. relations. It also publishes an annual newsletter in December, The Roosevelt.

== Collections and research ==
The RIAS has an extensive library collection on American and transatlantic history, including both secondary and primary sources. While the extensive book collection, with more than 9500 entries, can be searched by use of an online catalogue, the institute also owns more than a hundred microfilm collections and digital resources. These include, among others, copies of the papers of President Theodore Roosevelt; the presidential Office Files of Franklin D. Roosevelt, Harry S. Truman, Dwight D. Eisenhower, and John F. Kennedy; the papers of W.E.B. Du Bois; and Dutch-American diplomatic correspondence (dating back to 1784).

The RIAS library is freely accessible to any interested researchers in American history, culture, or Dutch-American relations. It also offers two kinds of grants for stimulating research in Middelburg: the Roosevelt Visiting Professorship and research grants provided by the institute itself. The former is meant for American scholars, while latter enables European scholars and students to research various topics related to U.S. history at the Roosevelt Institute for American studies without crossing the Atlantic.

== Four Freedoms Awards ==
Since 1982, the year that commemorated the centennial of President Franklin D. Roosevelt's birth and the bicentennial of diplomatic relations between the United States and the Netherlands, The Franklin D. Roosevelt Four Freedoms Medals are awarded in even-numbered years in Middelburg's Abbey and in odd-numbered years in Hyde Park, New York. These prestigious medals are awarded to men and women who have demonstrated an enduring commitment to the four principle freedoms as expressed by President Franklin Roosevelt in his State of the Union Message of January 6, 1941: Freedom of Speech and Expression, Freedom of Worship, Freedom from want, and Freedom from fear.

The laureates of the Four Freedoms Awards in Middelburg include:

- Princess Juliana of the Netherlands
- 14th Dalai Lama
- Václav Havel
- Desmond Tutu
- Nelson Mandela
- Kofi Annan
- Mohammed ElBaradei
