= MMTC Ltd =

Foreign exchange company of primary and non-primary products based in India

Metals and Minerals Trading Corporation of India Limited
- Type: Central Public Sector Undertaking
- Traded as: BSE: 513377; NSE: MMTC
- Industry: Trading Company
- Founded: September 26, 1963
- Headquarters: New Delhi, India
- Key people: Sanjay Chadha (Chairman & MD)
- Revenue: ▲₹28,997.23 crore (US$3.0 billion) (2019)
- Operating income: ▲₹183.86 crore (US$19 million) (2019)
- Net income: ▲₹81.43 crore (US$8.5 million) (2019)
- Total assets: ▼₹4,454.77 crore (US$460 million) (2019)
- Total equity: ▲₹1,489.25 crore (US$150 million) (2019)
- Owner: Government of India (89.93%)
- Number of employees: 778 (01st May 2020)
- Website: www.mmtclimited.com

MMTC Ltd. (known fully as Metals and Minerals Trading Corporation of India) is one of the two highest earners of foreign exchange for India and India's largest public sector trading body. Not only handling the export and import of primary products such as coal, iron ore, agro and industrial products, MMTC also exports and imports important commodities such as ferrous and nonferrous metals for industry, and agricultural fertilizers. MMTC's diverse trade activities cover third-country trade, joint ventures and link deals and all modern forms of international trading. The company has a vast international trade network, spanning almost in all countries in Asia, Europe, Africa, Oceania, and the United States, and also includes a wholly owned international subsidiary in Singapore, MTPL. It is one of the Miniratnas companies.

MMTC is one of the two highest foreign exchange earners for India (after petroleum refining companies). It is the largest international trading company of India and the first public sector enterprise to be accorded the status of Five Star Export Houses by Government of India for long-standing contribution to exports

Being the largest player in bullion trade, including retailing, MMTC's share was 146 tonnes of gold out of the total import of 600 tonnes of the precious metal in 2008–09.

== History ==
=== Foundation ===
The company was incorporated on 26 September 1963 in New Delhi. It falls under the Commerce Ministry. The Corporation started functioning on 1 October. The main objectives of the company were the export of mineral ores and the import of essential metals. According to a latest news, MMTC is Asia's biggest gold and silver importer.

=== State Trading Corporation ===
After Independence the government decided to authorize the mining of scarce mineral resources to the public sector rather than private sector, although India's National Mineral Policy clearly states that it does not "preclude the State from securing the co-operation of private enterprise in the larger interest of the State or to accelerate the pace of development"

Under the Constitution of India, mineral rights and authority of mining laws remain vested with the state governments. On the other hand, Central government regulates the development of minerals under the Mines and Minerals (Regulation) Act of 1957.

The MMTC has its origins in the 1950s, when the Indian government, with the interest of boosting agricultural and industrial development, determined to earn valuable foreign currency through the export of canalized mineral ores, which the country had huge deposits of. As a consequence of the government's decision to earn foreign currency, the State Trading Corporation of India Ltd. was founded in 1956, as a wholly owned government subsidiary, to handle the export and import of selected commodities.

=== 1963-2000 ===
The company had commenced its operation on 1 October 1963. With the rapid growth of the State Trading Corporation (STC) in its direct trading activities and in view of the importance given to the exports of mineral ores in the country's Five Year Plans, a decision was taken by the Government of India to split the STC and establish another corporation to deal exclusively with the trade in minerals and metals.

Japan and South Korea continued to be the major markets till the year of 1994. Then it made a foray into the European market with the exports of one lakh tonnes of iron ore to Slovakia and Romania. Also in the same year, the company had commenced the import of gold and silver against a special import license for supply to the customers in the domestic area. Imports worth 20 metric tonnes of gold and silver worth 270 tonnes were made, and the company opened new gold vaults at Hyderabad and Vizag to offer its services to the customers in these areas. However, manganese ore exports remained depressed due to the recession in the steel industry.

The wholly owned subsidiary MMTC Transnational Pte Ltd, Singapore was incorporated under the control of the company in the year 1994 itself. During the year 1995, MMTC opened a duty-free jewellery show room at Chhatrapati Shivaji International Airport and a Memorandum of understanding was signed with the government of Orissa for development of existing Gopalpur minor port into an all-weather, deep water and direct berthing port. In the same year, Board for Industrial & Financial Reconstruction (BIFR) had approved the scheme of merger-cum-amalgamation of Mica Trading Corporation of India Limited (MITCO) with MMTC. From the year 1996 onwards, the company started to import the Chemical items and Homeopathic Medicines. In 2003, MMTC's joint venture with the Orissa government, namely Neelchal Ispat Nigam Ltd., emerged as the second largest exporter of pig iron from India.

=== 2012 ===
On 14 September 2012. the Cabinet Committee on Economic Affairs decided disinvestment of 9.33% in MMTC.

Today, MMTC has the distinction of being:

- Largest exporter of minerals from India
- India's Largest Bullion Trader
- India's largest importer of Steel-Coal

== See also ==
- List of trading companies
