= Northwest Cameroon Company =

The Northwest Cameroon Company (German: Gesellschaft Nordwest-Kamerun) was a private trading corporation formed in 1899 to exploit natural resources in the Bamoun and Bamileke regions of the German colony of Kamerun.

== See also ==
- Gesellschaft Süd-Kamerun
