= Polish Trade Company =

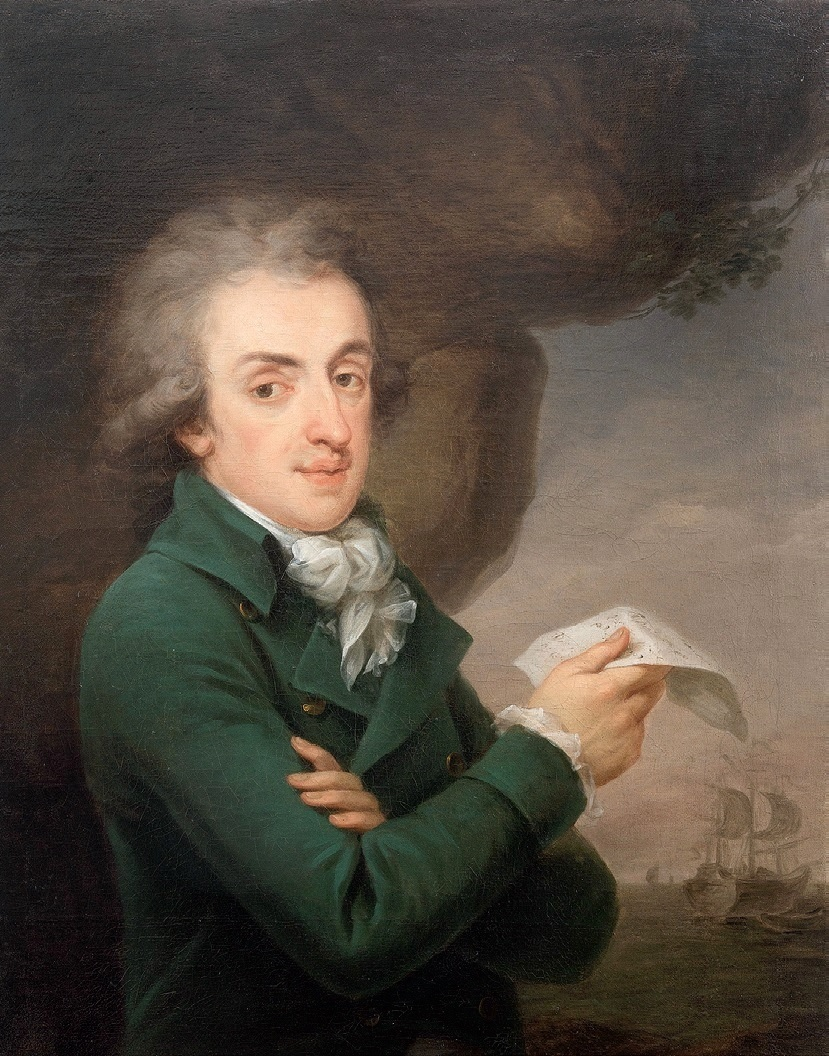
Antoni Protazy Potocki, founder of the Polish Trade Company

Polish Trade Company (Polish: Kompania Handlowa Polska), also known as Black Sea Trade Company (Polish: Kompania Handlu Czarnomorskiego), Black Sea Company (Polish: Kompania Czarnomorska), and Kherson Company (Polish: Kompania Chersońska) was a Joint-stock company which existed in the Polish–Lithuanian Commonwealth in 1783–1793. It controlled international trade of the Commonwealth via the Black Sea ports. Kompania Handlowa Polska was formally opened by Antoni Protazy («Prot») Potocki on March 18, 1783 in Winnica, Polish–Lithuanian Commonwealth (now: Vinnytsia, Ukraine).

Following the First Partition of Poland (1772), the Commonwealth lost land connection with its major Baltic Sea port, Gdańsk. Polish goods, transported northwards along the Vistula, were subject to high Prussian duties, with tax offices located at Fordon and Kwidzyn. As a result, Polish merchants and magnates were forced to find another trade route. Main Polish export at that time was agricultural produce from fertile lands of Polish Ukraine (see chernozem).

From 1768 Poland was a de facto Russian Empire protectorate. Furthermore, as a result of the Russo-Turkish War (1768–74), the Russians seized Black Sea coast together with the Crimea, and gained free pass of their ships through the Turkish Straits. Polish magnates decided to take advantage of this, and approached Russian government, asking for permission to use their Black Sea ports.

In early 1783, Empress Catherine the Great allowed Poles to use the port of Kherson, built in 1775. Soon afterwards, a Polish consulate was opened there, together with a department store. No Russian duties were imposed on Polish goods at Kherson. In 1785, Antoni Protazy («Prot») Potocki purchased land in the town of Jampol, and built there the Dniester river port, together with warehouses.

Potocki personally talked to a number of magnates and merchants, urging them to abandon the Vistula river trade, and move southwards, to Polish Ukraine. He was supported by Michał Ossowski, a merchant from Pomerelia, Potocki's friend and adviser. Ossowski was chief agent of Prot Potocki's bank, also operating company's office in Kherson.

At first the company transported its goods only to Kherson, where they were loaded on Russian ships, and transported to Western European ports. Later on, the company bought several ships, with mostly international crews. First ship of Trade Company Poland was Św. Michał; in 1784, Polska, Ukraina, Podole, Jampol and Św. Prot were bought. As a result of these purchases, first regular Polish merchant fleet was created. Its ships sailed mostly from Kherson to Marseille, but also to Barcelona, and Alexandria.

Ships of the Company Fleet used a modified Russian Navy Ensign, with a blue St. Andrew's Cross and a Polish eagle on a red rectangle in upper left corner. This banner was a compromise: according to international treaties, only ships equipped with Habsburg and Russian banners were allowed to pass through the Turkish Straits. Polish historian Antoni Rolle argues however that ships of the Company Fleet used a traditional Polish banner (white eagle on red field), which was changed only for the passage through the straits.

The development of Black Sea trade resulted in decrease in Polish exports through Baltic Sea ports of Gdańsk and Königsberg (Królewiec). Furthermore, prices of Ukrainian grains went up.

The price of shares of the company was estimated at 1000 red zlotys, with maximum number of ten shares per a shareholder. Its statute allowed foreigners to purchase shares, and the company was personally supported by King Stanisław August Poniatowski, who himself negotiated with Catherine the Great the conditions of usage of the port of Kherson. Furthermore, it enjoyed the support of Primate Michał Jerzy Poniatowski.

The development of Black Sea trade was slow, due to several factors, such as:

- underdevelopment of Ukrainian agriculture and infrastructure,
- financial problems of Polish merchants,
- long and hazardous route from Kherson to Western Europe, via the Mediterranean,
- high costs of transport,
- natural obstacles along the Dniestr river route, such as rocks and waterfalls near Jampol.

The company began to decline after the outbreak of the Russo-Turkish War (1787–92), when most ships were seized by the Russians to transport their troops. By 1793, it virtually ceased to exist, also because of financial problems of Potocki and loss of agricultural lands in the second partition of Poland. Furthermore, one of its major investors, Warsaw bank of Tepper-Ferguson declared bankruptcy.

== Sources ==
- Bałtruszajtys Grażyna, "Kompanie akcyjne w Polsce w drugiej połowie XVIII wieku". Z zagadnień prawa akcyjnego, Czasopismo Prawno-Historyczne, 1959, z. 2.
- Gaziński Radosław, Prusy a handel solą w Rzeczypospolitej w latach 1772–1795, Warszawa 2007.
- Guldon Zenon, Związki handlowe dóbr magnackich na prawobrzeżnej Ukrainie z Gdańskiem w XVIII wieku, Toruń 1966.
- Mądzik Marek, Polskie inicjatywy handlowe w rosyjskich portach czarnomorskich na przełomie XVIII i XIX wieku, Lublin 1984.
- Mądzik Marek, "Powstanie i pierwsze lata działalności Kompanii Czarnomorskiej (1782–1785)", Rocznik Lubelski, T. 21, 1979, s. 77-92.
- Mądzik Marek, "Z dziejów polskiego handlu na pobrzeżu Morza Czarnego w końcu XVIII" w. Annales Universitatis Mariae Curie-Skłodowska Sectio F, Nauki Filozoficzne i Humanistyczne, T. 28, s. 205-226.
- Wilder Jan Antoni, Traktat handlowy polsko-pruski z roku 1775. Gospodarcze znaczenie utraty dostępu do morza, Warszawa 1937.
- Zielińska Zofia, "Prot Potocki", [w:] Polski Słownik Biograficzny, t. 28/1, z. 116, 1984 r.
- Pertek Jerzy, Polacy na morzach i oceanach, Poznań, 1981, ISBN 83-210-0141-6, s. 609-614
