= Middelburgsche Commercie Compagnie =

Dutch trading company, 1720–1889

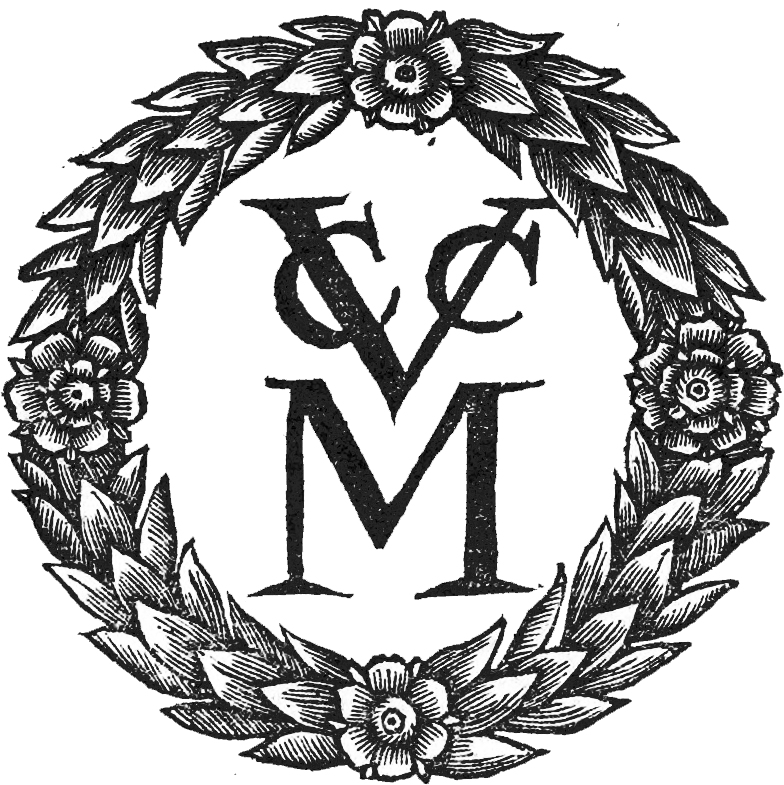

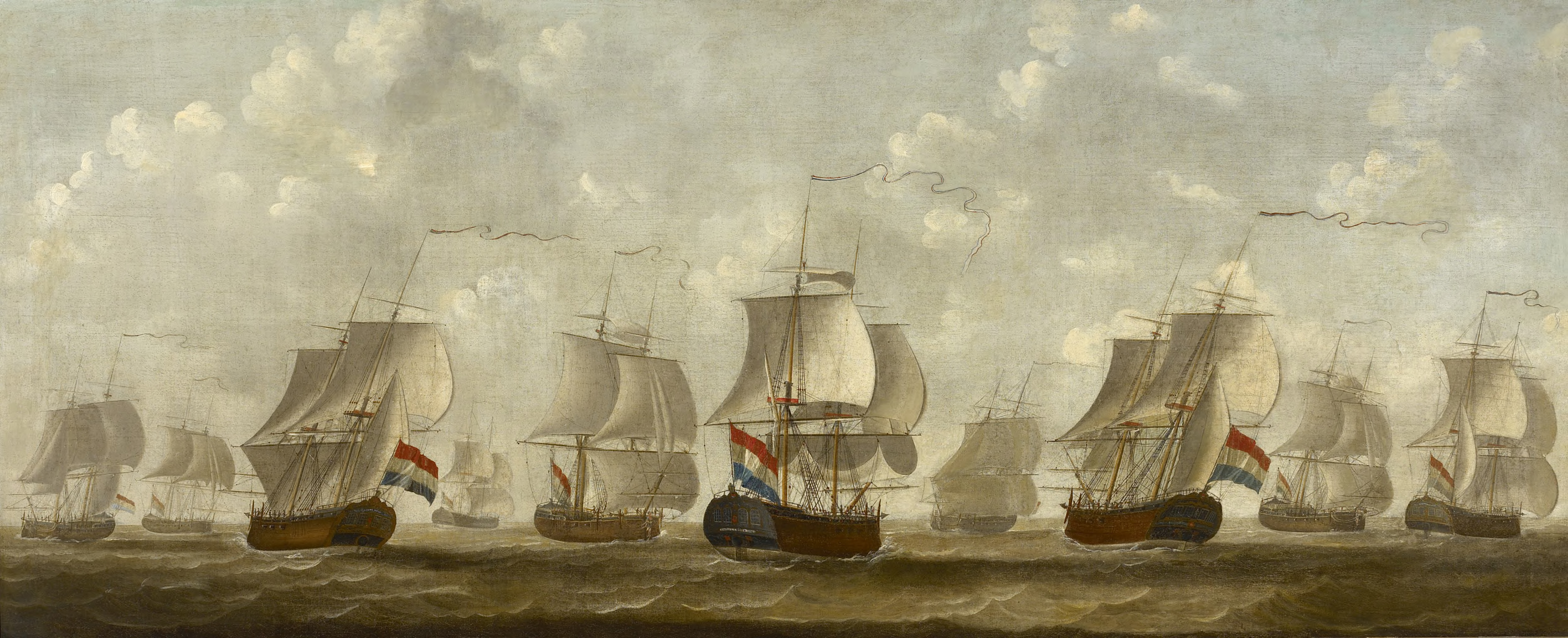
- Snow Ships of the Middelburgsche Commercie Compagnie (1767-1780), Engel Hoogerheyden, Zeeuws Archief / Stadscollectie Middelburg
- Native name: Commercie Compagnie van Middelburg
- Type: Trading company
- Industry: Atlantic slave trade
- Founded: 1720
- Defunct: 1889
- Headquarters: Middelburg, the Netherlands

The Middelburgsche Commercie Compagnie (MCC) was a Dutch trading company established in 1720 in the Zeeland capital of Middelburg, Netherlands. It was initially called the Commercial Company of the city of Middelburg. However, after the archive industry was published in 1950 by W. S. Unger, it became known as the Middelburg Commercial Company. After the monopoly of the Dutch West India Company for the Atlantic slave trade was abolished in 1730, the MCC became the principal Dutch slave trading company around 1746.

In 1777, the company shipped gunpowder and arms to Sint Eustatius and the island was blockaded by the Royal Navy. The company was eventually liquidated in 1889. Thanks to the well-preserved notes and documents of the company, the MCC archives have proved very useful to scholars in understanding and constructing Dutch 18th-century slave trade. The archive was listed in 2011 in UNESCO's Memory of the World International Register. Access to many materials can be found in the Zeeuws Archief in Middelburg.

== See also ==
- List of trading companies
- Snouck Hurgronje & Louijsse – contemporary Middelburg company in the Atlantic slave trade
- List of trading companies
