= Essequibo Society =

Dutch Republic trading company, 1771–1788

Sociëteit ter Navigatie op Essequebo en annexe Rivieren or SVE
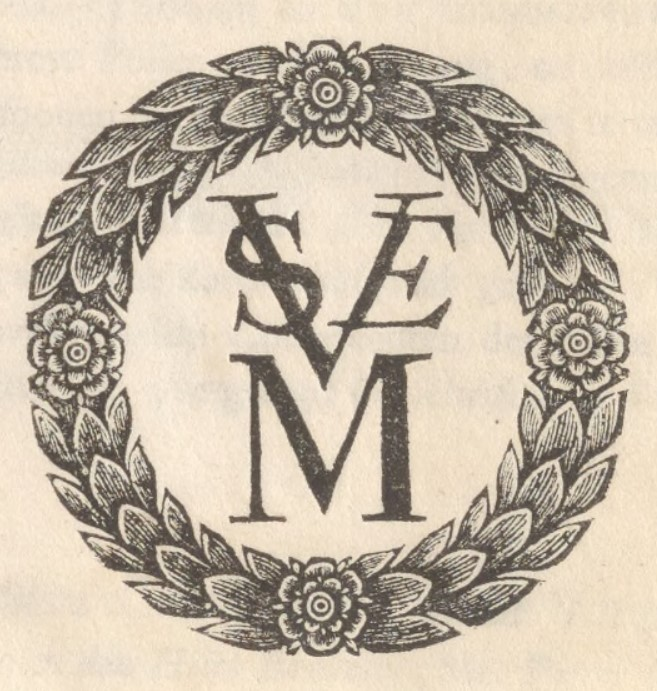
- Logo of the SVE, source: Zeeuws Archief, 87, Verzameling Verheye van Citters, inv.nr. 51d

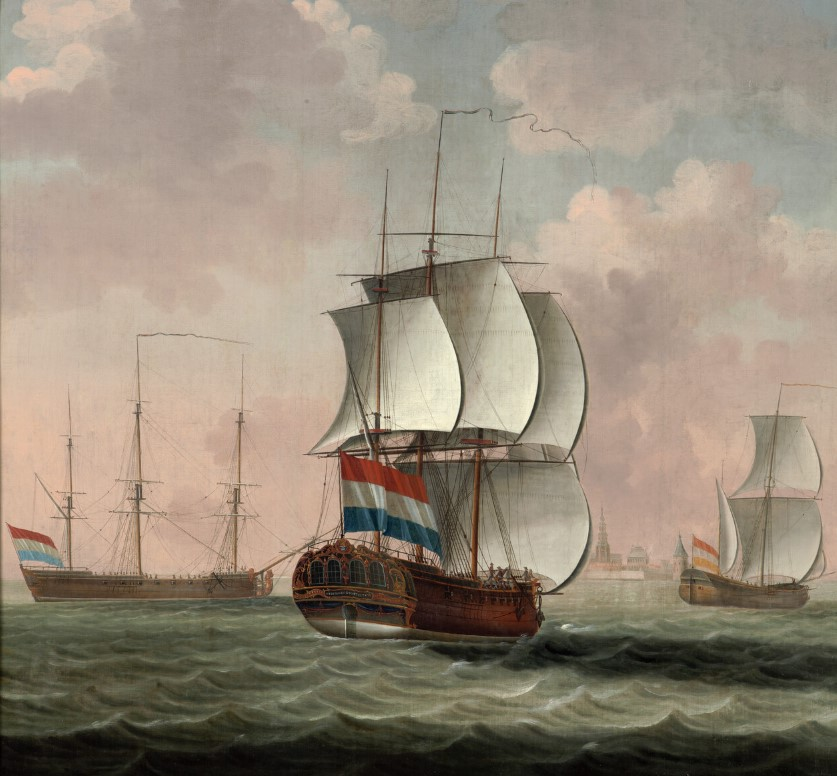
- Detail of a painting of the frigate Essequebo Sociëteit on the roadsted of Flushing, oil on canvas, Engel Hoogerheyden, 1772. Collection Scheepvaartmuseum Amsterdam, object A.1171.
- Native name: Sociëteyt ter Navigatie op Essequebo en annexe Rivieren
- Company type: Chartered company
- Industry: Consumer goods
- Founded: 1 March 1771
- Defunct: 1 January 1788
- Headquarters: Middelburg, The Dutch Republic
- Key people: Board of Directors: Kornelis van den Helm Boddaert; P.C. van Visvliet; Daniël Radermacher
- Products: Sugar; cocoa; coffee; cotton
- Operating income: ▼ fl. 320,000
- Number of employees: unknown

The Essequibo Society, in Dutch: Sociëteit van Essequibo, (SVE), full name in 18th century Dutch Societeyt ter Navigatie op Essequebo en annexe Rivieren, was a Dutch trading company headquartered in Middelburg, founded in 1771 and disestablished in 1788. The society was founded to preserve Zeeland´s preferential trading rights to Essequibo. It went bankrupt as a consequence of the Fourth Anglo-Dutch War.

== History ==
=== Foundation ===
The right to trade on Essequibo River and Demerara River had been reserved for residents of Zeeland since 1670, a privilege that was exploited mainly by the Zeeland Chamber of the Dutch West India Company. As the trade grew in significance, the Zeeland monopoly was questioned. In reaction, in 1754 merchants from Zeeland developed a project for the establishment of an Essequibo Society. The project did not materialize at the time.

In 1771, Willem V finally promoted a regulation that opened up the market for merchants of Amsterdam. Zeeland retained the right to equip the first 16 ships per year. All ships had to sail from Zeeland and unload their return cargo there.

In response to the changed regulations, merchants from Middelburg led by Kornelis van der Helm Boddaert founded the Essequibo Society in 1771. 185 merchants subscribed for an amount of 320,000 guilders. Other participants were Johan Adriaan van de Perre de Nieuwerve, representing Willem V; the MCC, the roperies Fortuyn and Swarte Kabel and the Middelburg city government.

In the first two years, six ships were purchased: Phoenix, Planterslust, Vreede, Eensgezindheid, Middelburgs Hoop and Westhove. In addition, the frigate Essquebo Societeit was built and launched from the Middelburg slipway in 1772.

=== Operation and bankruptcy ===
Merchants from Zeeland accounted for 152 voyages between 1771 and 1789. The first two financial years, Essequebo Society paid 3% dividend and retained 4,500 guilders in cash. After that year, losses were reported until 1778. After 1779 profits were again made. After the Fourth Anglo-Dutch War broke out, four ships were captured by the British: Eensgezindheid, Jonge Juffrouw Margaretha, Middelburgsche Hoop and Vryheid. The financial situation of the society deteriorated. In 1788 it was decided to liquidate. The debt was paid off by selling ships, so that the organization continued to exist for some time.

== Captains ==
Captains who sailed for the Essequebo Society were: Wrister Pieterse Nap, Stoffel Different, Maarten van Lou, Barend Land, Frans Hansen, Cornelis Medendorp, Jan Clisser, Hans Theudels, Hendrik Medendorp, Rocus van Swijndregt, Andries Christiaan Doutz, Pieter Willem Prins, Pieter Harmszoon, Rocus Boom and Barend Goverts.

== Sources ==
=== Literature ===
- A. Wisse, 'De overgave van Demerary en Essequibo in 1781', in: Historia. Maandschrift voor geschiedenis en kunstgeschiedenis 8 (1942) 191–192.
- Ruud Paesie, ‘De 'Societeyt ter Navigatie op Essequebo en annexe Rivieren' : op- en ondergang van een Zeeuwse rederij ‘, in: Maurits Ebben, Henk den Heijer en Joost Schokkenbroek (red), ‘’Alle streken van het kompas. Maritieme geschiedenis in Nederland‘’ (Zutphen, 2010) 295-316.
- Ruud Paesie, Sociëteit van Essequebo; op- en ondergang van een coöperatieve scheepvaartonderneming, 1771-1788 (Vlissingen, 2017).
- P.M. Netscher, Geschiedenis van de koloniën Essequebo, Demerary en Berbice, van de vestiging der Nederlanders aldaar tot op onzen tijd ('s-Gravenhage, 1888).

=== Archival sources ===
Zeeuws Archief, Middelburg

- 87 – Verheye van Citters, inv.nrs. 51d
- 255 – Familie Mathias-Pous-Tak van Poortvliet, inv.nrs. 314–318.
- 2802 - A.A. Brown, inv.nrs. 18, 25, 34, 35, 44, 55.
