= Zeeuws Archief =

- Zeeuws Archief
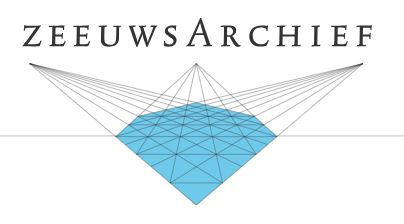

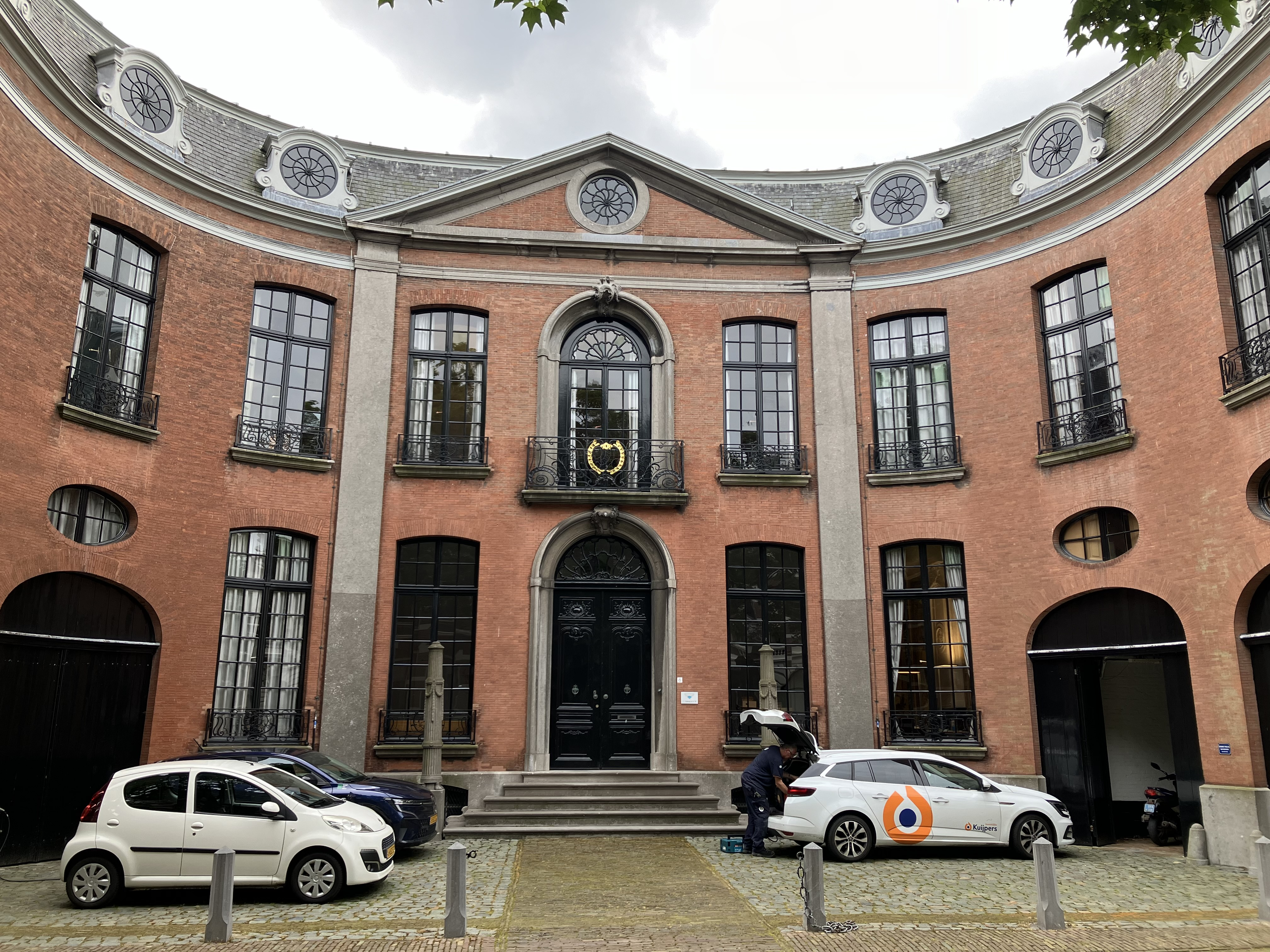
- Formation: 1 January 2000
- Headquarters: Van de Perrehuis, Hofplein 16, 4331 CK, Middelburg
- Fields: Genealogy and History research of Zeeland
- Directeur: Dr. Anya Luscombe
- Staff: about 60 (+/- 50 fte) and about 75 volunteers
- Website: www.zeeuwsarchief.nl/en/

The Zeeuws Archief (transl. Zeeland Archives) is a knowledge centre for historical and genealogical research in Zeeland, the Netherlands, located in Middelburg, Terneuzen, and Zierikzee. It is the Regional Historic Centre for the province of Zeeland, the municipalities of Middelburg, Veere, Flushing, Terneuzen, Schouwen-Duiveland, and Kapelle, as well as government institutions in Zeeland (Court, Notaries, Rijkswaterstaat); Waterschap Scheldestromen (regional Water board) and many social organizations, companies and families in Zeeland.

== Tasks ==
The Zeeuws Archief is a knowledge centre for historical land genealogical research in Zeeland. The public record office has an extensive collection consisting of archives, drawings, maps, prints and photos on all possible subjects from the province of Zeeland. The Zeeuws Archief formally functions as the National Archive in Zeeland and as the municipal archive for the municipalities of Middelburg, Veere, Vlissingen, Terneuzen, Schouwen-Duiveland and Kapelle.

== Collection ==
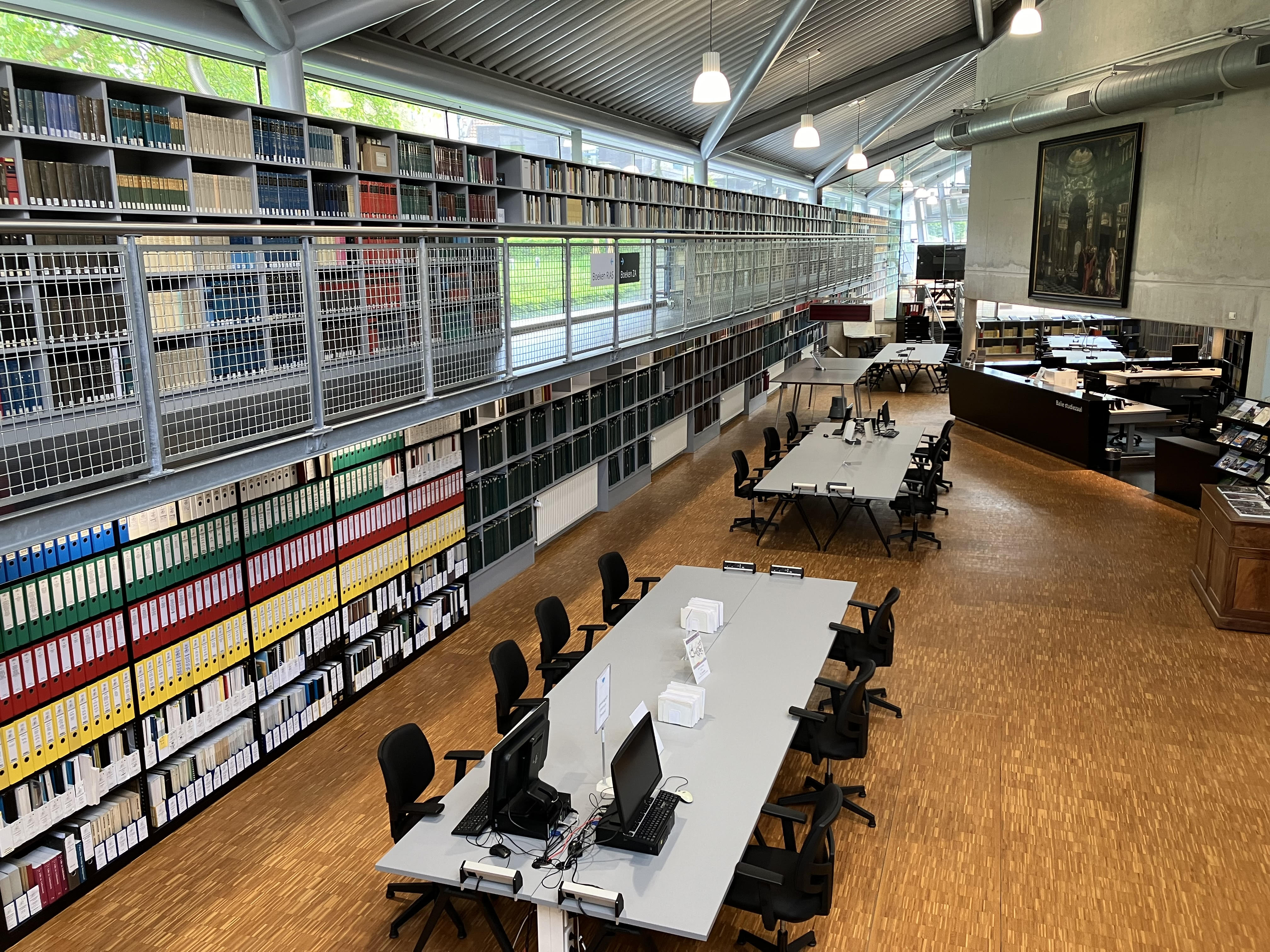
Study room and library of the Zeeuws Archief, 4 June 2024

The Zeeuws Archief manages archives and collections from national, provincial, and private institutions with the province of Zeeland or its predecessors as its area of operation and from municipal authorities and private institutions in the municipalities of Middelburg, Veere and Kapelle and predecessors. If arranged linear, the collection would be approximately 34 kilometres (21 mi) long.

The archives include that of the Middelburgse Commercie Compagnie and that of the shipyard Koninklijke Maatschappij De Schelde, which both are included on the Unesco World Heritage List for documents. Another important archive is that of the Deltadienst (Delta Service) in which the Delta Plan and Delta Works are recorded.

In addition to the physical storage location for archive documents, the Zeeuws Archief has also had an e-depot since 2015, in which the ‘digital born’ archives of the provincial government institutions are stored. The Zeeuws Archief is working intensively on digitizing frequently consulted archive documents, such as those of the Stichting Herbouw Middelburg (Foundation for Reconstruction of Middelburg), the Audit Chamber archives and those of the Municipal Works department Middelburg. Between 2018 and 2023, the digitized archive increased from 8.39 to 37.32 Gigabytes. Approximately 2.8 million web pages are visited annually, which is several times more than physical visitors. Each year, between 1,500 and 2,000 visitors come to the Middelburg branch, who together request approximately eight- to ten thousand archive documents.

In 2007 the Zeeland Archives conclude a service agreement with the Zeeland Islands Water Board, now Scheldestromen Water Board and its legal predecessors as far as the Zeeland islands are concerned, were managed by the Zeeland Archives and made available in the study room. The archives of the former Zeeland Flanders Water Board are managed and made available in het Water Board office in Terneuzen.

=== Highlights of the collection ===
- Parchment Act from 1189, the oldest archive piece of the collection. In 1189 the Bishop of Utrecht (Traiectum) gave the inhabitants of Hoogelande permission to build a chapel.
- Illustrated diary of wine merchant Hendrik Brouwer (1769–1837)
- Parchment Act of Maximilian of Burgundy from 1551, in which he donates a gilded cup to the city of Veere. The cup is still in use to drink wine when the reigning Dutch monarch visits Veere.
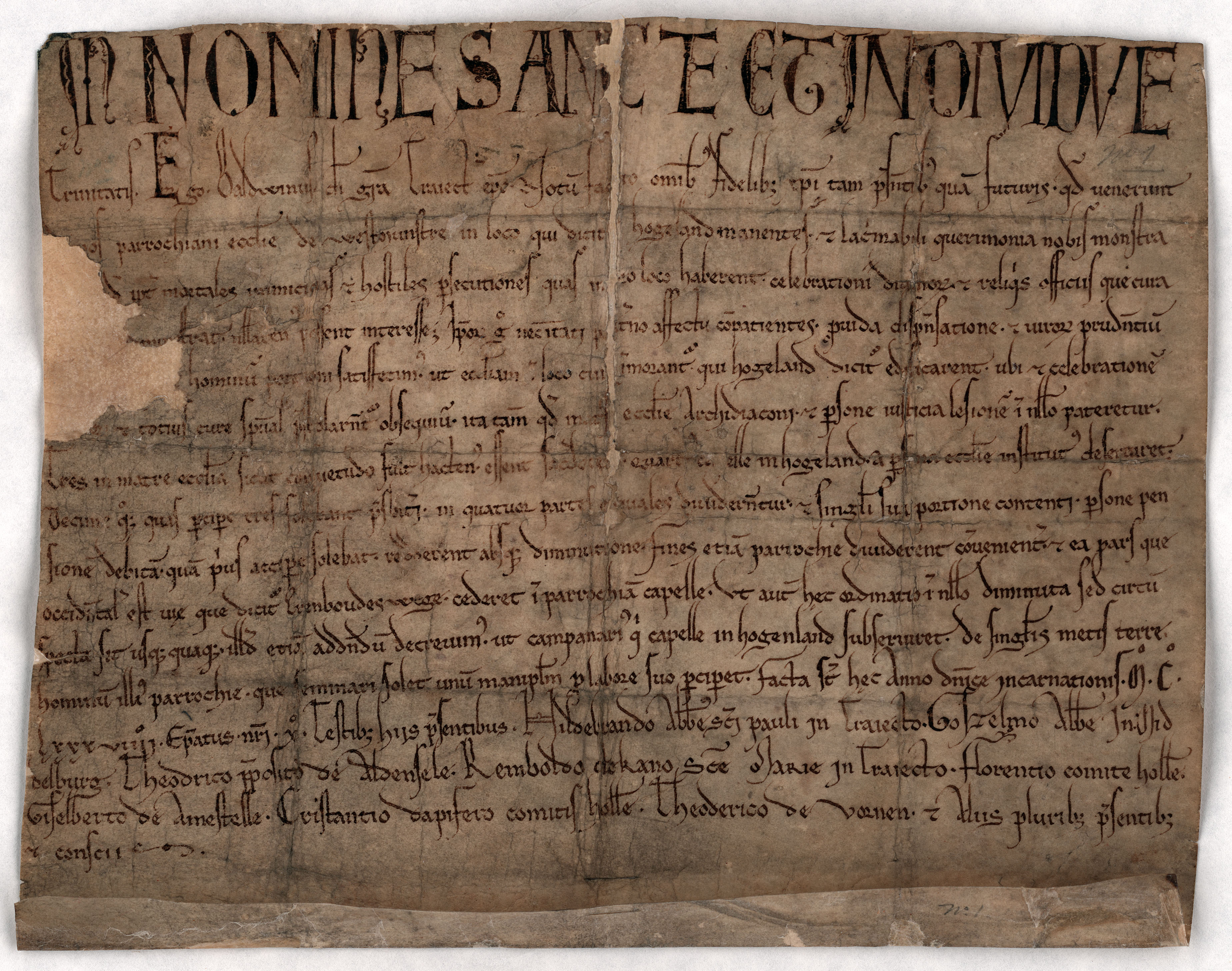
Parchment Act from 1189 about the foundation of the chapel of Hoogelande, ZA, 27, inv.nr. 2.

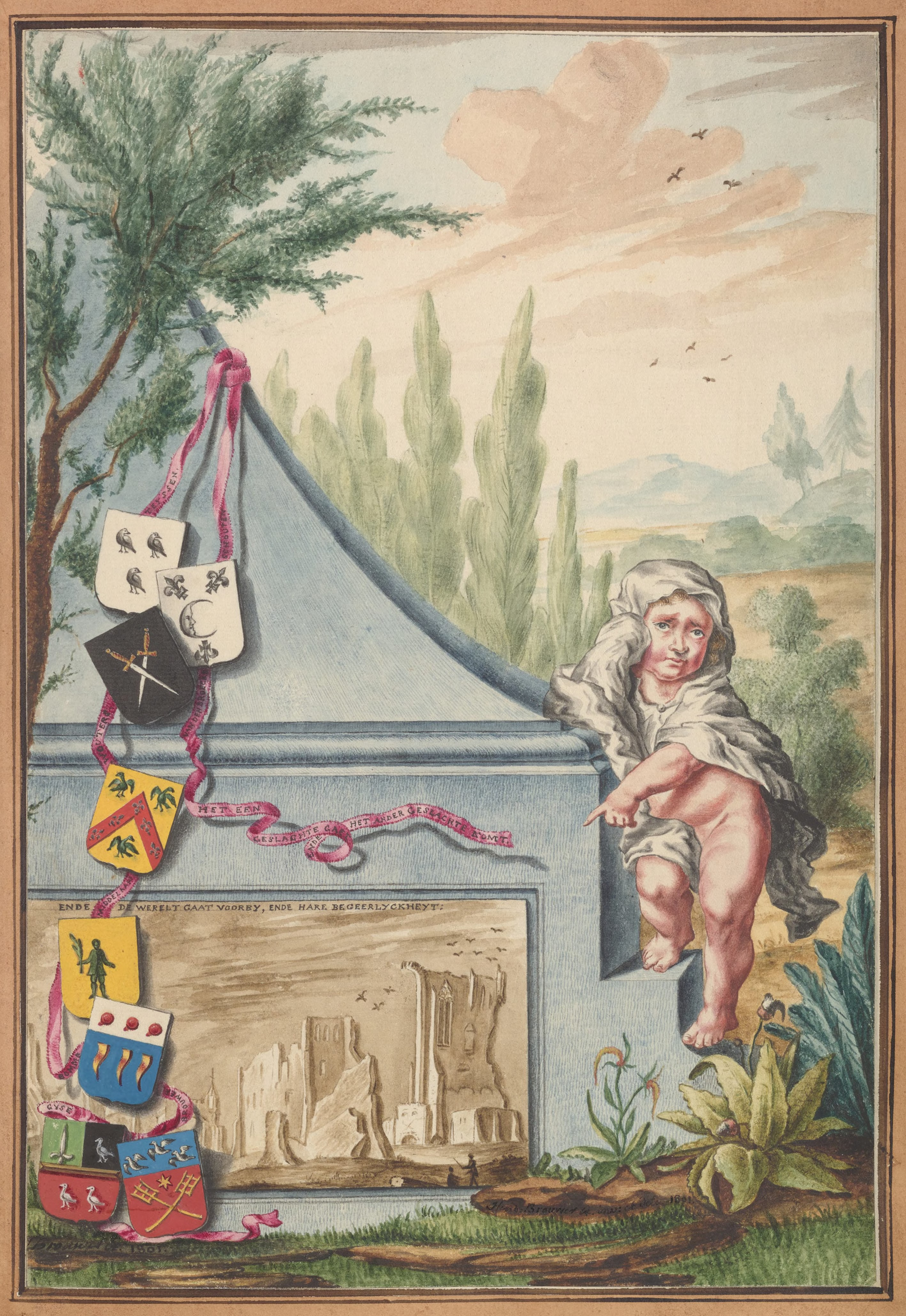
Page out of the family genealogy that Hendrik Brouwer wrote, ZA, 1753, inv.nr. 1.

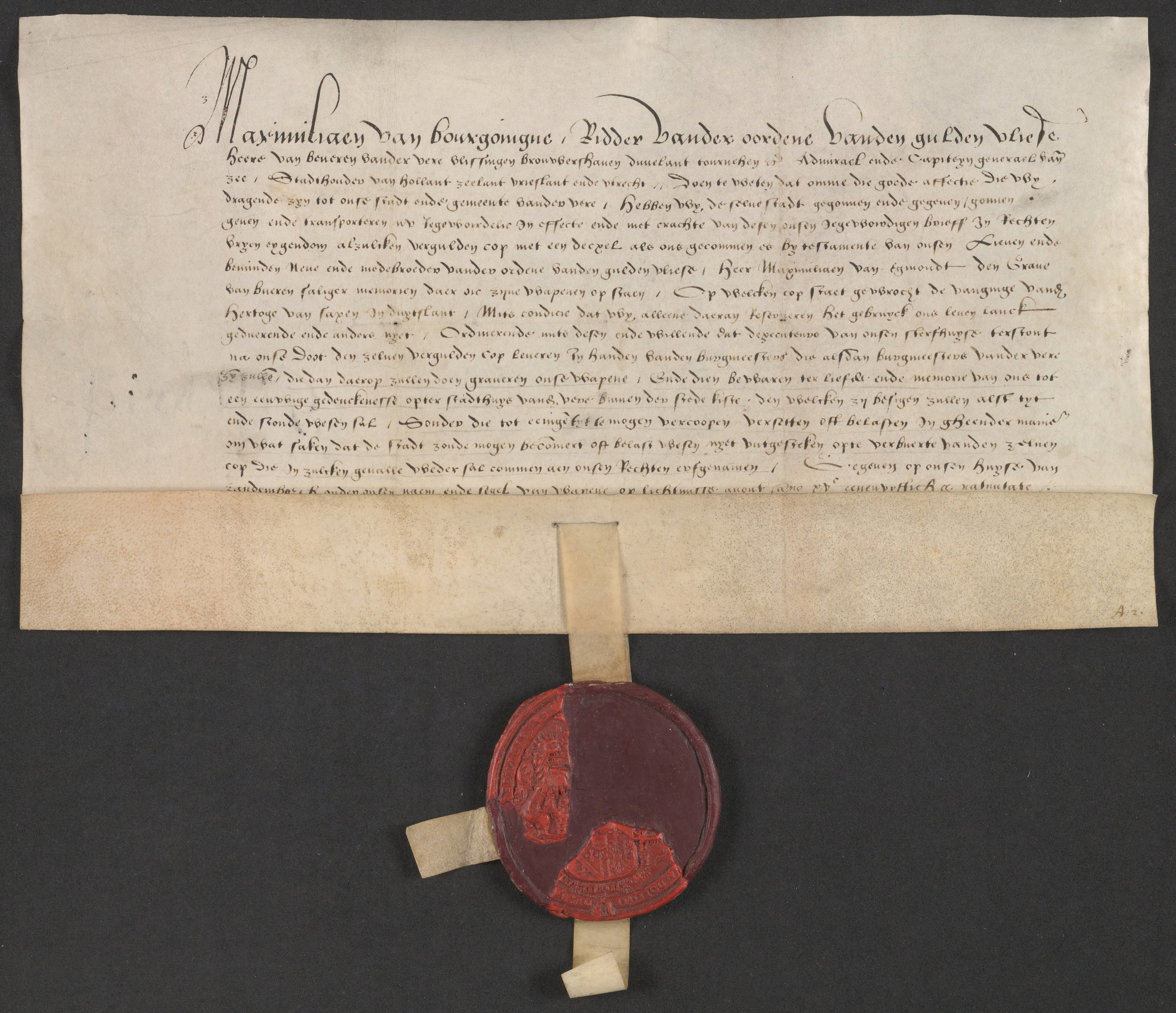
Parchment Act of Maximilian of Burgundy about the donation of a cup to Veere

== Housing ==
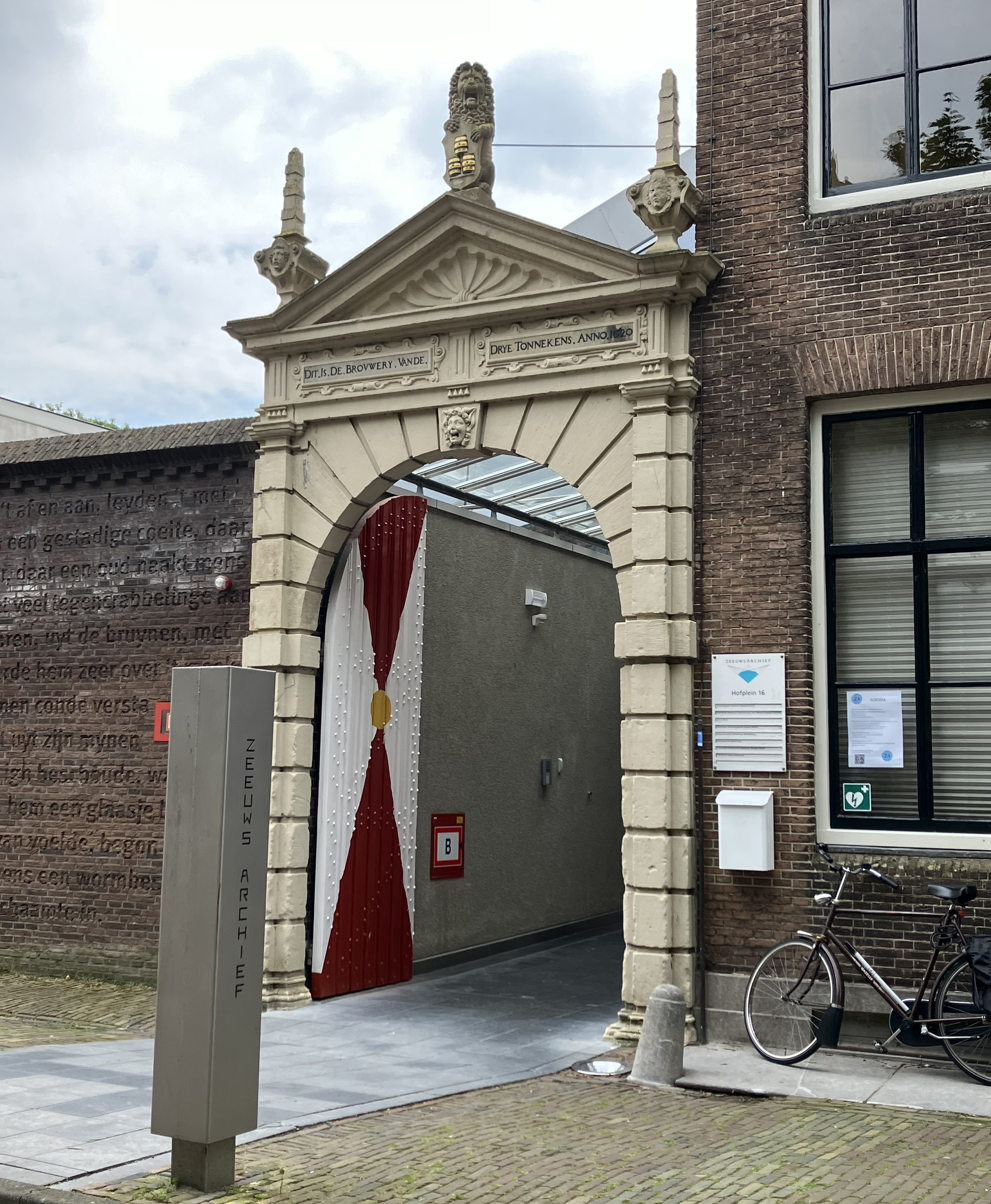
Entrance of the old city brewery "Drye Tonnekens", and nowadays of the Zeeuws Archief, 4 June 2024

The office functions of the Zeeuws Archief are housed in the monumental Van de Perrehuis, an eighteenth-century city palace in the centre of Middelburg, built on the cellars of a commandery of the Teutonic Order. For public functions, the building has been expanded with an modern wing, which houses the reception, depots, study room and archive café. The Zeeland Genealogical Centre and the Roosevelt Institute for American Studies (RIAS) are also located in an adjacent building, internally connected to the Zeeuws Archief.

== Organisation ==
The Zeeuws Archief was founded in 2000 through a merger between three archive services: the National Archives in Zeeland, the Municipal Archives of Middelburg and the Municipal Archives of Veere. The Zeeland Archives has been open to public since 4 January 2000.

The Joint Arrangement Zeeland Archives is an independent administrative body and is an initiative of the National Archives Service (Ministry of Education, Culture and Science), the Municipality of Middleburg and the Municipality of Veere. The Zeeuws Archief consists of three departments: Staff, Information & Knowledge and Management & Exploration. The Zeeuws Archief is supported by the Friends of the Zeeuws Archief Foundation.

=== Friends of the Zeeuws Archief Foundation ===
The Friends of the Zeeuws Archief Foundation financially contributes to acquisition of archives, exhibitions, and publications or restoration of archives and the organization of the Friends’ Lecture. The Friends’ Lecture, held by a well-known Dutch writer, draws attention to the importance of archives and is held every year on the first Saturday of November as the closing event of the Open Day of the Zeeland Archives.

== Directors ==
Archivist of the province of Zeeland:

- Jacob Philip van Visvliet, 1843–1888

National Archive Zeeland:

- Jacob Pieter Nicolaas Ermerins, 1890–1894
- Robert Th. Azn. Fruin, 1894–1910
- Klaas Heeringa, 1911–1921
- Adriaan Meerkamp van Embden, 1921–1943
- Willem Sybrand Unger, 1944–1954
- Pieter Scherft, 1954–1980
- Roelof Koops, 1980–1991, 1993–2000

Zeeuws Archief:

- Roelof Koops, 2000–2010
- Hannie Kool-Blokland, 2010–2024
- Anya Luscombe, 2025
