= Trading company =

Company specialized in trade

Trading companies are businesses working with different kinds of products which are sold for consumer, business, or government purposes. Trading companies buy a specialized range of products, maintain a stock or a shop, and deliver products to customers.

Different kinds of practical conditions make for many kinds of business. Usually two kinds of businesses are defined in trading.

Importers or wholesalers maintain a stock and deliver products to shops or large end customers. They work in a large geographical area, while their customers, the shops, work in smaller areas and often in just a small neighborhood.

Today "trading company" mainly refers to global B2B traders, highly specialized in one goods category and with a strong logistic organization. Changes in practical conditions such as faster distribution, computing and modern marketing have led to changes in their business models.

The Winding-up and Restructuring Act, an act of the Parliament of Canada, uses the following definition:

"trading company" means any company, except a railway or telegraph company, carrying on business similar to that carried on by apothecaries, auctioneers, bankers, brokers, brickmakers, builders, carpenters, carriers, cattle or sheep salesmen, coach proprietors, dyers, fullers, keepers of inns, taverns, hotels, saloons or coffee houses, lime burners, livery stable keepers, market gardeners, millers, miners, packers, printers, quarrymen, sharebrokers, ship-owners, shipwrights, stockbrokers, stock-jobbers, victuallers, warehousemen, wharfingers, persons using the trade of merchandise by way of bargaining, exchange, bartering, commission, consignment or otherwise, in gross or by retail, or by persons who, either for themselves, or as agents or factors for others, seek their living by buying and selling or buying and letting for hire goods or commodities, or by the manufacture, workmanship or the conversion of goods or commodities or trees;

Japan has a special class of "general trading companies" (sogo shosha), large and highly diversified businesses that trade in a wide range of goods and services.

== See also ==
- List of trading companies
- Chartered company
