= The Great 78 Project =

Digitisation of vinyl records

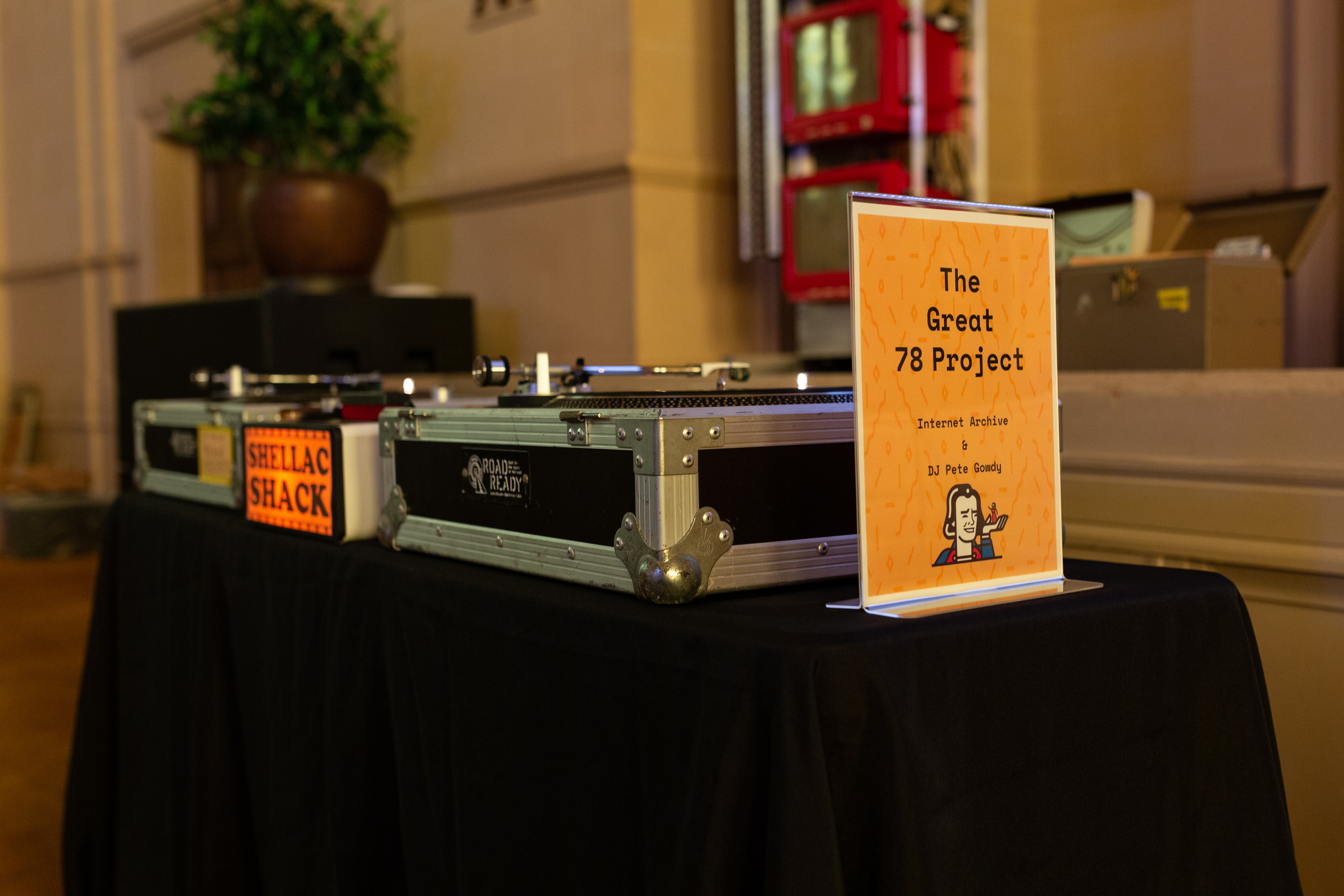
Great 78 Project DJ table (2019)

The Great 78 Project is an initiative developed by the Internet Archive which initially received funding to digitize 250,000 78 rpm singles (500,000 songs) as well as phonograph cylinders from the period between 1880 and 1960, donated by various collectors and institutions. The project has been developed in collaboration with the ARChive of Contemporary Music and George Blood, L.P., responsible for the audio digitization. The project is curated by B. George, director of the ARChive of Contemporary Music. The goal of the initiative is not to remaster or enhance the original recordings, but to present them as "historical artifacts". The majority of the 78 rpm recordings being digitized have never been published in other media before. As of 2025, it said it had digitized 400,000 recordings.

== Digitization process ==
The digitization of the archive is done by audio engineer George Blood and his team at George Blood, L.P., at a rate of 5,000 to 6,000 sides per month, or 100 sides (50 singles) per engineer per day. Blood had previously been responsible for the digitization of 10,000 singles for the National Jukebox, a similar project organized by the Library of Congress. Each song is recorded in 16 different versions (using four different styli, recording both sides of the groove wall, and with/out equalization), the best of which is highlighted by the engineer to aid the listener.

== Collections ==
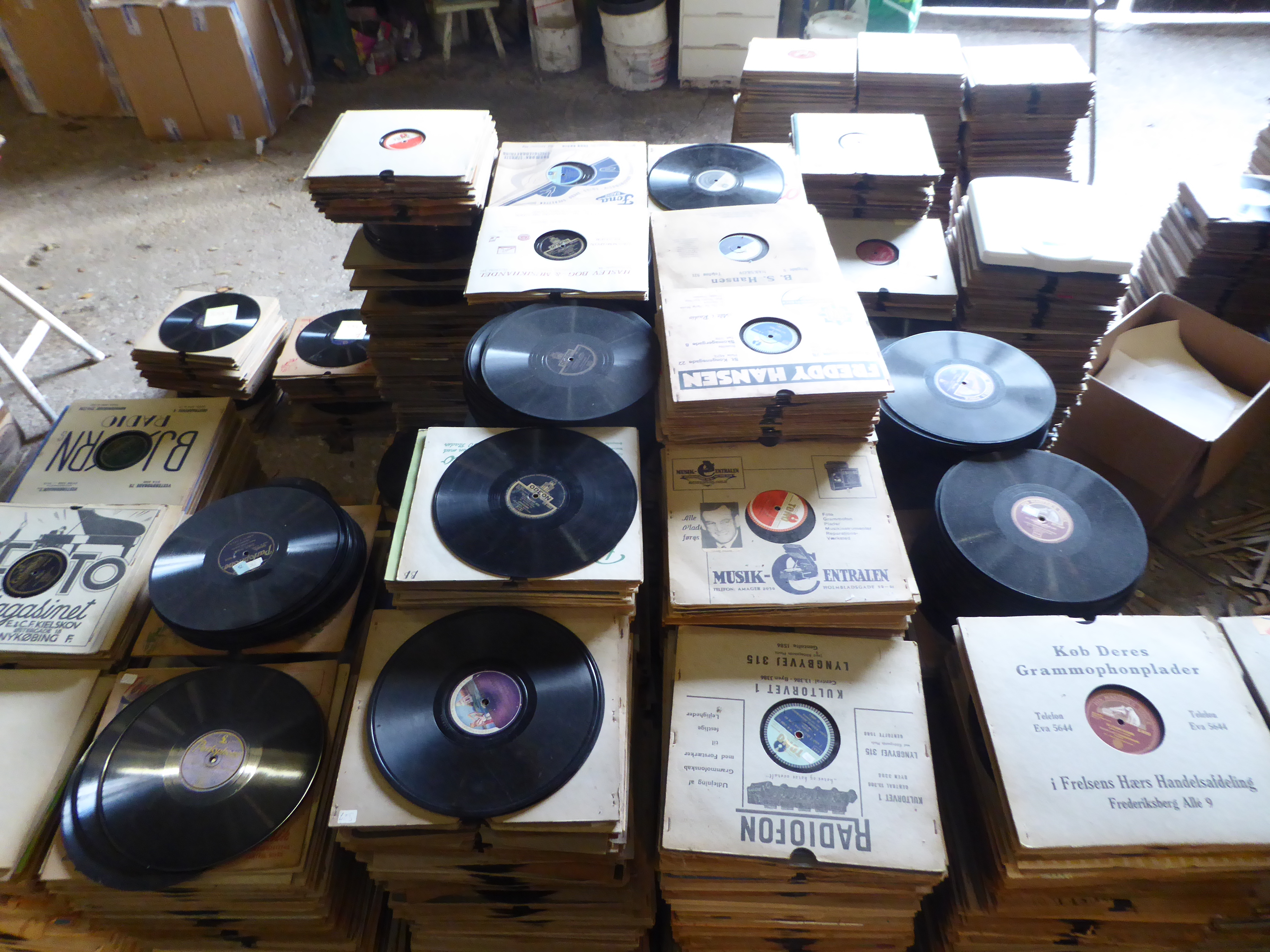
An incoming donation of 78 rpms gathered in Denmark

The bulk of the project's singles are sourced from private collections, some of which had previously been donated to libraries or even abandoned. These include:

- The Joe Terino Collection, a collection of 70,000 78 rpm singles stored in a warehouse for 40 years.
- The Barrie H. Thorpe Collection, which had been deposited at the Batavia Public Library in Batavia, Illinois, in 2007 by Barrie H. Thorpe (1925–2012). It contains 48,000 singles.
- The Daniel McNeil Collection, with 22,359 singles.
- The Charles Stratton Collection, containing over 8,000 singles, previously donated to Kansas State University by Charles William Stratton's (1906–1966) estate in 1968.
- The David Chomowicz and Esther Ready Collection, with 4,000 LPs and singles, focused on Latin American and Caribbean music.
- The Daniel Jan Walikis Polka Collection, with 2,000 LPs and singles devoted to polka and Eastern European music.
- The Richard Thayer Skidmore Collection, which includes 1,400 78s and over a hundred LPs of jazz music.
- The KUSF Collection, donated by the University of San Francisco’s online radio station, including all of its 78 rpm singles.
- The Jules Vandersarl Collection, with 1,675 singles.

In addition, the project has received 78s donated to the ARChive of Contemporary Music, which however focuses on more recent music. The ARChive contains over 5 million items, but only a small fraction of these are 78 rpms.

== Legal issues and outage ==
In August 2023, the Internet Archive was sued by major music labels, including Universal Music Group and Sony Music Entertainment, for illegally hosting 2,749 recordings as part of The Great 78 Project, including those belonging to Bing Crosby, Chuck Berry, and Duke Ellington. A settlement for the lawsuit was reached in September 2025.

On the week of October 20, 2024, the Archive suffered a massive outage (possibly because of a DDoS attack), in which most media was taken down from the servers.

== See also ==
- Cylinder Audio Archive, similar project which digitizes wax cylinders
- List of record collectors
