= I've Got My Love to Keep Me Warm =

Song
- Published: 1937 by Irving Berlin, Inc.
- Songwriter: Irving Berlin

"I've Got My Love to Keep Me Warm" is a popular song copyrighted in 1937 by its composer, Irving Berlin, and first recorded by (i) Ray Noble (January 5, 1937), Howard Barrie, vocalist; (Note: Howard Phillips, aka Howard Barrie (né Howard Baron Phillips; 1909–1985), a baritone, began singing for Ray Noble in December 1936, succeeding Al Bowlly, who after six years with Noble, returned to England to start his own band. Phillips – on June 9, 1953, in Bedford, New York – married actress Kay Linaker.) (ii) Red Norvo (January 8, 1937), Mildred Bailey, vocalist; (iii) and Billie Holiday with her orchestra (January 12, 1937). The song – sung by Dick Powell and Alice Faye – debuted on film February 12, 1937, in the musical, On the Avenue.

== Background ==
The Noble, Norvo, and film renditions were successful that year, as well as the other 1937 recordings that included Billie Holiday and Glen Gray (vocal by Kenny Sargent).

Les Brown's instrumental version, arranged by Skip Martin and recorded in 1946 as Columbia #38324, became a million-seller and Billboard top ten song in 1949. Brown said that he got a call from Columbia Records after he performed the song telling him to record it, only to respond that he had recorded it three years earlier. That same year, vocal group The Mills Brothers also had a chart hit with their version on Decca #24550.

== Other recordings ==
External audio
- You may hear "I've Got My Love to Keep Me Warm" played by the Shep Fields Rippling Rhythm Orchestra in 1937; Here on archive.org

Although considered a seasonal winter song and not strictly a Christmas song, since the lyrics make no mention of the holiday, it has been recorded for many artists' Christmas albums and is a standard part of the holiday song repertoire in the U.S. Artists such as Rosemary Clooney, Doris Day, Dean Martin, Bette Midler, Frank Sinatra, Rod Stewart, Pentatonix (in a virtual duet with Sinatra), Dinah Washington and Idina Menzel (in a duet with Billy Porter) are among those who have covered it. Ella Fitzgerald recorded this for her 1958 Verve release Ella Fitzgerald Sings the Irving Berlin Songbook.

During the Big Band era, the song was also recorded by several leading sweet jazz bands including Shep Fields and his Rippling Rhythm Orchestra in 1937.

== Bibliography ==
=== References ===
- Catalog of Copyright Entries. Part 3 – "Musical Compositions" – New Series. Vol. 32, No. 1. Library of Congress, Copyright Office. 1938 – via Internet Archive.
1. "I've Got My Love to Keep Me Warm" (©8 January 13, 1937; Class E (musical composition) Published 59842; Irving Berlin, Inc.). from On the Avenue, w & m Irving Berlin; with arrangement for guitar, etc. U.S. Govt. Print. Off. 1937. p. 40 – via Internet Archive.
- Gilliland, John Sanford Jr. (1935–1998) (197X). "1940s, Program #22". Pop Chronicles (4 audo cassetts). See Pop Chronicles. University of North Texas Libraries – via UNT Digital Library (all tracks). ISBN 978-1-5593-5147-8, 1-5593-5147-0; OCLC 31611854 (all editions).

Micucci, Matt (30 November 2018). "A Short History of … "I've Got My Love to Keep Me Warm" (Irving Berlin, 1937) - JAZZIZ Magazine". Jazziz.

- Dick Powell (vocalist); Alice Faye (vocalist) (February 12, 1937). "I've Got My Love to Keep Me Warm". On The Avenue (film). 20th Century Fox Film Corporation – via YouTube. (alternate link. 4 January 2012 – via YouTube.)
- Rust, Brian Arthur Lovell (1922–2011) (1975). The American Dance Band Discography, 1917–1942. Arlington House Publishers – via Google Books (University of Michigan Library). LCCN 75-33689; ISBN 978-0-8700-0248-9, 0-8700-0248-1; OCLC 1818389 (all editions).
1. "Ray Noble" "HP" (Howard Phillips, vocalist). Vol. 2. p. 1311.
2. "Red Norvo" "MB" (Mildred Bailey, vocalist). Vol. 2. p. 1314.
3. "Roy Ross" "DR" (Don Rodney, vocalist). Vol. 2. p. 1544.
4. "Sterling Young" "BM" (Billy Mozet, vocalist). Vol. 2. p. 1994.
- Rust, Brian Arthur Lovell (1922–2011) (1973). Debus, Allen George (1926–2009) (ed.). The Complete Entertainment Discography, From the Mid-1890s to 1942. Arlington House Publishers – via Google Books. LCCN 73-13239; ISBN 978-0-8700-0150-5, 0-8700-0150-7; OCLC 700684 (all editions).
1. "Alice Faye". p. 269.
2. "Dick Powell". p. 530.
3. "Aileen Stanley". p. 530.
- SecondHandSongs. "Cover versions of 'I've Got My Love to Keep Me Warm'". SecondHandSongs.
- Whitburn, Joel (1986). Joel Whitburn's Pop Memories, 1890–1954. Menomonie, Wisconsin: Record Research, Inc. p. 525. ISBN 978-0-89820-083-6 – via Internet Archive (ARChive of Contemporary Music). LCCN 86-225626; ISBN 0-8982-0083-0, 978-0-8982-0083-6; OCLC 15252908 (all editions).
1. Whitburn, Joel (1986). "The Songs" → "I've Got My Love to Keep Me Warm". Record Research. p. 525. ISBN 978-0-89820-083-6.
2. Whitburn, Joel (1986). "The Artists" → "Les Brown". Record Research. p. 62. ISBN 978-0-89820-083-6.
3. Whitburn, Joel (1986). "The Artists" → "Mills Brothers". Record Research. p. 316. ISBN 978-0-89820-083-6.
4. Whitburn, Joel (1986). "The Artists" → "Art Lund". Record Research. p. 285. ISBN 978-0-89820-083-6.
5. Whitburn, Joel (1986). "The Artists" → "Billie Holiday". Record Research. p. 215. ISBN 978-0-89820-083-6.
6. Whitburn, Joel (1986). "The Artists" → "Glen Gray". Record Research. p. 184. ISBN 978-0-89820-083-6.
7. Whitburn, Joel (1986). "The Artists" → "Ray Noble". Record Research. p. 337. ISBN 978-0-89820-083-6.
8. Whitburn, Joel (1986). "The Artists" → "Red Norvo". Record Research. p. 338. ISBN 978-0-89820-083-6.
9. Whitburn, Joel (1986). "The Artists" → "Starlighters". Record Research. p. 410. ISBN 978-0-89820-083-6.
10. Whitburn, Joel (1986). "Billboard Discjockey Polls". Record Research. p. 638. ISBN 978-0-89820-083-6.
