= List of record collectors =

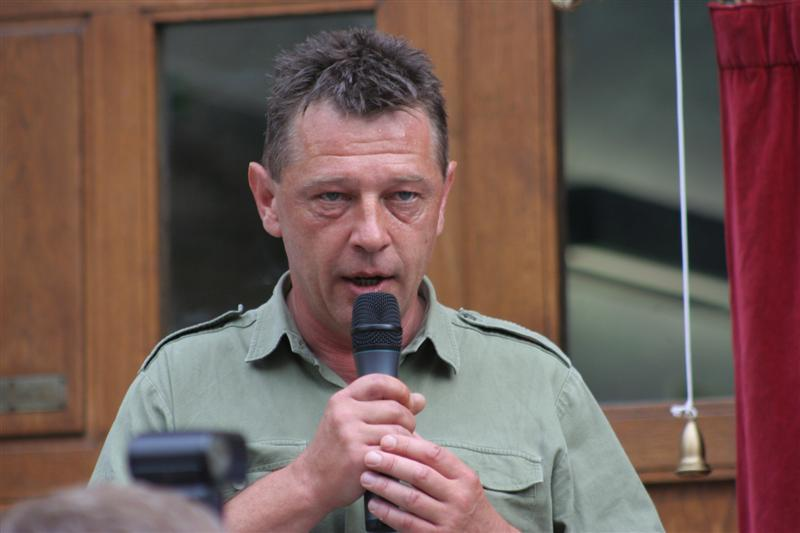
Andy Kershaw's record collection reportedly weighed seven tons at one point.

This article lists the owners of the largest private music collections, some of which have been donated to public institutions for their study and preservation. As of 2017, the largest record collection with over 6 million items belongs to Zero Freitas.

== Over 1 million items ==
- Zero Freitas (born 1950s): more than 6 million items (Emporium Musical).
- Paul Mawhinney (born 1939): 3 million items (Record-Rama), sold to Freitas in 2013.
- Bob George (born 1949): 2.2 million items, donated to the ARChive of Contemporary Music in partnership with Columbia University.
- Craig Kallman: 1.5 million records, also described as 2.2 million recordings.
- Anonymous Brazilian collector: 1 million items, sold to Freitas.

== Over 100,000 items ==
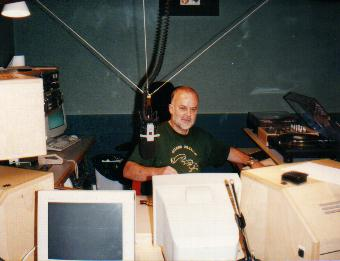
John Peel's record collection contains 26,000 LPs, 40,000 singles and 40,000 CDs.

- Julián Ruiz (born 1950): 623,202 items, mostly vinyl LPs and singles.
- Phil Swern (1948–2024): at least 200,000 vinyl singles, 80,000 vinyl albums, and 300,000 CDs. Swern notes that he may have between six and seven million titles in total, but no definitive count has been made.
- Bob Altshuler (1923–2007): 250,000 items, donated to the Library of Congress, largest private collection of jazz and blues.
- Keith Skues (born 1939): 250,000 items, mostly vinyl records kept at his home.
- Larry Woodlee: 250,000 items, primarily vinyl records, of which 50,000 were sold to McKay's, a second-hand shop in Nashville.
- Armand Panigel (1920–1995): over 200,000 items of classical music, hosted at Studios La Fabrique.
- Cristóbal Díaz Ayala (born 1930): 150,000 items (Diaz Ayala Cuban and Latin American Popular Music Collection), donated to the Florida International University, largest collection of Cuban and Latin American music.
- Joel Whitburn (1939-2022): 150,000 items, specialized in Billboard-charting singles and albums.
- Paul 'Trouble' Anderson (1959–2018): 150,000 items.
- Carl Cox (born 1962): 150,000 items.
- Mike Read (born 1947): 120,000 items, auctioned in 2009.
- Robert Roberge (1921–2004): over 100,000 items (Mooncurser Records), sold two years after his death.
- Greg Shaw (1949–2004): over 100,000 items.
- John Peel (1939–2004): over 100,000 items.
- Doug Smith (born 1958): over 100,000 items, including 45s, 78s, LPs, wax cylinders, etc.
- DJ Doveboy: over 135,000 items, including 45s, LPs, 78s and CD singles.

== Over 50,000 items ==
- Dr. Demento (born 1941): 85,000 items.
- Dr. Dre (born 1965): 80,000 items, sold.
- Carlos Martín Ballester (born 1974): 75,000 78 rpm records (carlosmb archive) plus 5,000 78 rpms records and 200 cylinders (private collection). It is the largest collection of 78 rpm records pressed in Spain. Part of the archive is on sale and new items are added regularly.
- Elton John (born 1947): 70,000 items. He accumulated a large vinyl record collection, including the purchase of BBC producer Bernie Andrews' personal collection of every 45 rpm pop record released in Britain from 1964 to 1975. In the documentary All Things Must Pass (2015), John described making frequent forays into Tower Records trailed by assistants, buying multiple copies of any album that struck his eye, so that he could have the same collection at each of his residences. He sold the collection in 1993 to raise money for AIDS charity.
- Daniele Baldelli (born 1952): 65,000 items.
- Ray Avery (1920–2002): over 63,000 items (Ray Avery Collection), specialized in jazz, donated to the University of California, Los Angeles in 1987.
- DJ Shadow (born 1972): over 60,000 records.
- Alex Paterson (born 1959): 60,000 items.
- Alejandra Fierro Eleta (born c. 1959): over 50,000 items (Gladys Palmera Collection), largest private archive of Latin music. As of 2019, she claimed to have 55,000 vinyl records and 45,000 CDs; or 60,000 vinyl records and 35,000 CDs.

== Over 10,000 items ==
- Chris Strachwitz (born 1931): over 44,000 items, comprising 125,000 recordings digitized by Arhoolie Records as part of the Strachwitz Frontera Collection, the largest archive of Mexican and Mexican-American music.
- Stephen and David Dewaele (best-known as members of the bands 2ManyDJs and Soulwax): over 40.000 records. As sons of radio and TV host Zaki, the Dewaele Brothers grew up among vinyl records and started collecting them themselves. On 26 March 2014, students of the PXL university digitalized 5.000 of the more than 40.000 vinyl records owned by the Dewaele Brothers. As a gift back, the brothers played a set at a student afterparty.
- David Freeman (born 1939): over 40,000 items, specialized in early country music.
- Ian Dewhirst (born 1955): 38,000 items.
- Vincent Gallo (born 1961): over 35,000 items.
- Bob Harris (born 1946): 35,000 items.
- Byron Coley (born 1956): over 30,000 items.
- Don Tait (1941–2023): a 1991 article in the Chicago Tribune said he owned 30,000 78 RPM records of classical music, which he would play on his programs on WFMT. According to his obituary, the weight of his collection required him to reinforce the floor of his house.
- Augusto Arango Franco: over 30,000 items, which he plays in his bar La Música de Augusto in Medellín since 2001.
- Charles Delaunay (1911–1988): 30,000 items, formerly one of the largest private jazz collections.
- Gilles Peterson (born 1964): 30,000 items.
- Joe Bussard (1936-2022): 25,000 items.
- John R. T. Davies (1927–2004): 20,000 items (John R. T. Davies Collection), specialized in jazz, donated to the University of York Sound Archives.
- Brian Rust (1922–2011): 10,000 items, primarily jazz.

== Others ==
- Grandmaster Flash (born 1958): stores his collection in a dedicated building.
- Andy Kershaw (1959–2026): collection weighed seven tons at one point.
- Tony Prince (born 1944): claimed to have biggest record collection in the world.
- Harry E. Smith (1923–1992): thousands, specialized in American folk music, tried to donate to Ash Records (later Folkways Records), instead partially released on Anthology of American Folk Music and other LPs.
- Robert Crumb (born 1943): over 8,000 78 rpm records, including many rarities from the 1920s and 1930s.

== See also ==
- List of most valuable records
