= List of most valuable records =

The following is an attempt to list some of the most valuable records. Data is sourced from Record Collector, eBay, Popsike, the Jerry Osborne Record Price Guides, and other sources.

== Sales ==
Artist	Song/Album	Cost (either sold, purchased or estimated)	Information
Wu-Tang Clan	Once Upon a Time in Shaolin	$4,000,000	Wu-Tang Clan's Once Upon a Time in Shaolin CD (of which only one copy was produced) was sold through Paddle8 on November 24, 2015, for $2,000,000, according to Record Collector 449. On December 9, 2015, Bloomberg Businessweek identified the buyer as hedge fund manager Martin Shkreli. On September 10, 2021 the Wu-Tang Clan broke their own record when the United States Department of Justice, which had seized the album from Martin Shkreli as part of a forfeiture, sold the album for $4,000,000 to crypto collective PleasrDAO, according to The New York Times.
Bob Dylan	"Blowin' in the Wind"	$1,800,000	A one-off recording of Dylan's "Blowin' in the Wind" sold for $1.8 million at auction in 2022, according to multiple sources, including Rolling Stone.
The Beatles	The Beatles (the "White Album")	$790,000	The Beatles (the "White Album") (Parlophone UK album, 1968) – Ringo Starr's personal copy (No. 0000001) was sold for $790,000 in December 2015, according to Rolling Stone. This is the highest price ever paid for an album that has been commercially released.
Elvis Presley	"My Happiness"	$300,000	Elvis Presley's "My Happiness" acetate was purchased by Jack White for $300,000 in January 2015. It was then re-released on Record Store Day 2015 by Third Man Records.
The Beatles	Sgt. Pepper's Lonely Hearts Club Band	$290,500	A fully signed copy of The Beatles' Sgt. Pepper's Lonely Hearts Club Band LP sold for $290,500 (£190,000) in 2013.
John Lennon and Yoko Ono	Double Fantasy	$150,000	A copy of John Lennon and Yoko Ono's Double Fantasy (Geffen US album, 1980), autographed by Lennon five hours before his murder. This sold in 1999 for $150,000.
Frank Wilson	"Do I Love You (Indeed I Do)"	$133,818	One of two known copies of this Northern soul classic (SOUL*35019, US 7-inch 45 rpm in plain sleeve, 1966), fetched over £100,000 in 2020, according to the Harborough Mail. Northern soul is a highly collectible area, based around obscure American soul singles.
The Beatles	Yesterday and Today	$125,000	Yesterday and Today (Capitol, US album in ‘butcher’ sleeve, 1966). A sealed mint "first state" stereo copy sold for US$125,000 in February 2016, unsealed mint copies of this pressing have regularly sold for well over $15,000. Other pressings and states are also available, in both mono and stereo with prices ranging from $150 to $10,000.
The Quarrymen	Untitled	$105,047.13	A tape of The Quarrymen performing live sold for £78,500
The Silver Beatles	Untitled	$46,826.67	The Silver Beatles' Decca audition tape fetched £35,000 at auction
John Lennon	Untitled	$30,000	A recording of John Lennon singing at a party in 1973 sold for $30,000 at Bonhams in 2008
The Beatles	"Till There Was You"	$103,685.70	10-inch acetate sold in March 2016 for £77,500, according to Record Collector 453.
Mick Jagger and Keith Richards	Untitled	$67,230.98	The earliest known tape of Mick Jagger and Keith Richards rehearsing fetched £50,250 at auction.
The Jimi Hendrix Experience	Untitled	$64,287.54	1968 Woburn Music Festival performance sold for £48,050 at Christie's.
David Bowie (with The Konrads)	Untitled	$52,660.14	Omega sold David Bowie's first demo tape (with The Konrads) for £39,360 in 2018 (Record Collector 485).
Michael Jackson	"What More Can I Give"	$50,000	A Michael Jackson "What More Can I Give" studio reference CD sold on eBay for $50,000 in 2015
Long Cleve Reed & Little Harvey Hull	"Original Stack O'Lee Blues"	$50,000	"Original Stack O'Lee Blues" (Black Patti, US 78 rpm in plain sleeve, 1927). $50,000 offered to Joe Bussard, according to Amanda Petrusich's Do Not Sell At Any Price.
Scaramanga Silk	"Choose Your Weapon"	$41,095	Sold for $41,095 on Discogs.
Aphex Twin	Caustic Window	$46,300	A test pressing of Aphex Twin's Caustic Window album sold for $46,300 on eBay in 2014, with the buyer being Markus Persson, the creator of Minecraft.
Dark	Dark Round the Edges	$36,123.57	A highly limited colour gatefold copy of Dark's Round The Edges prog LP sold for £27,000, according to Pete Bonner from Psychotron, in Record Collector 517.
Tommy Johnson	"Alcohol and Jake Blues"	$37,100	A copy of Tommy Johnson's "Alcohol and Jake Blues" 78 rpm sold for $37,100 on eBay in 2013
The Beatles	Please Please Me (Parlophone stereo version with the black and gold label)	$29,864.83	A copy of The Beatles' Please Please Me LP (the Parlophone stereo version with the black and gold label, which regularly sells for over £1,000) sold in 2009 for £22,322.
Bob Dylan	The Freewheelin' Bob Dylan	$35,000	The Freewheelin' Bob Dylan (CBS, US album, stereo 1963, featuring four tracks deleted from subsequent releases), a copy belonging to Dylan's one-time girlfriend Suze Rotolo with hand-written notes on the track-listing, was auctioned by Christie's in New York for a reported $35,000.
Jean-Michel Jarre	Musique pour Supermarché (Music for Supermarkets)	$45,048.17	Music for Supermarkets (Disques Dreyfus, France, FDM 18113), Only one copy of this LP exists. It was auctioned for 36,000FR (approx. $14,000 at the time, or about $33,563 in 2016) in Paris in 1983.
Tony Sheridan & The Beat Brothers	"My Bonnie"	$30,000	A copy of Tony Sheridan & The Beat Brothers' (The Beatles) "My Bonnie" 7" (Decca stock copy, 1962) was sold for $30,000 by Heritage Auctions, according to Record Collector 539.
The Beatles	"Can't Buy Me Love"	$27,500	A copy of the Beatles' "Can't Buy Me Love" 7" (Capitol, black & yellow vinyl) was sold for $27,500 by Heritage Auctions, according to Record Collector 539.
Prince	The Black Album	$27,500	A copy of Prince's untitled "black album" sold on Discogs for $27,500 in June 2018.

== Estimates or valuations ==
Artist	Song/Album Name	Estimate or valuation	Information
Pink Floyd	King Bee"/"Lucy Leave		Pink Floyd's "King Bee"/"Lucy Leave" acetate valued at £25,000
Joseph Beuys	Ja Ja Ja Nee Nee Nee		A copy of Joseph Beuys' 100-only 'multiple' reel-to-reel edition of Ja Ja Ja Nee Nee Nee album from 1969 was valued at over £30,000.
David A. Stewart	Untitled		The Daily Mirror and other sources reported a Rare Record Price Guide story in April 2015 that a David A. Stewart 'Test' 78 from 1965 was worth £30,000.
The Quarrymen	"That'll Be the Day"/"In Spite of All the Danger"	$267,640.00	The Quarrymen – "That'll Be the Day"/"In Spite of All the Danger" (UK 78–rpm, acetate in plain sleeve, 1958). Only one copy made. The one existing copy is currently owned by Paul McCartney. Record Collector magazine listed the guide price at £200,000 in issue 408 (December 2012). McCartney had some "reissues" pressed in 1981 on UK 10-inch 78 RPM and 7-inch 45 RPM, in reproduction Parlophone sleeves, 25 copies of each; these are estimated to be worth upwards of £10,000 each.
The Beatles	Love Me Do	$50,000–$100,000	"Love Me Do" (EMI) one-sided acetate, the only unedited version with count-in - estimated at $50,000–$100,000.

== Other ==
Artist	Song/Album Name	Estimate or valuation	Information
The Beatles	Please Please Me		An acetate version of The Beatles' Please Please Me album from the US on Vee-Jay (1963) had a £30,000+ offer refused on it.
El Peyote Asesino	Terraja	Unknown	Terraja (Universal Music Group, Uruguay, UMD 40141), the band's second album, which after dissolving In 1999 (a year after the album's release) all copies of it were discontinued from Uruguayan record stores, and it is considered a "difficult to find" item.

== See also ==
- List of record collectors
- Record collecting
