= It Still Moves (disambiguation) =

It Still Moves may refer to:

- Eppur si muove, the phrase attributed to Galileo Galilei
- It Still Moves, the 2003 album by My Morning Jacket
- It Still Moves: Lost Songs, Lost Highways, and the Search for the Next American Music, the 2009 book by Amanda Petrusich
