= Zero Freitas =

Brazilian businessman and record collector

José Roberto "Zero" Alves Freitas (born c. 1955) is a Brazilian businessman whose record collection of over eight million discs is said to be the largest in existence. In addition, he has more than 100,000 compact discs.

== Early life ==
Freitas was born around 1955, and acquired the nickname "Zero" at school. When he was a child, his father bought a hi-fi stereo that came with 200 albums, thus kindling Freitas's interest in the area. The collection was damaged in a flood and Freitas later recreated it. His mother, who had a collection of 400–500 records, also influenced Freitas. The first record he bought was Canta para a Juventude by Roberto Carlos, which he acquired around December 1964 or January 1965. By the time Freitas left high school he had 3,000 records. Freitas studied music composition at college then took over the family transport business which ran buses in the state of São Paulo. By the time he was 30, Freitas had acquired about 25–30,000 records.

== Expansion ==
Until recently, most of Freitas's buying was anonymous. He placed adverts in Billboard magazine reading "RECORD COLLECTIONS. We BUY any record collection. Any style of music. We pay HIGHER prices than anyone else." and used agents to act on his behalf. He bought the remaining stock of 200,000 records from Colony Records in New York's Times Square after the store's 2012 closure and bought the stock of Rio de Janeiro's Modern Sound store around the same time. Around 2013 he bought the collection of Murray Gershenz, the former proprietor of the Music Man Murray record shop in Los Angeles. Also in 2013, Freitas bought the collection of Paul Mawhinney of Record-Rama, once itself thought to be the largest in the world. The collection of around three million records took eight semi-trailers to move.

== Publicity ==
The extent of Freitas's collection was first revealed to the world after details were published in an article in The New York Times Magazine in August 2014. At that time he was estimated to have "several million" records. By March 2015, his collection was estimated at six million, making his the largest record collection in existence. Freitas was unable to explain why he continues to acquire so many records, saying "I’ve gone to therapy for 40 years to try to explain this to myself". He collects 33, 45 and 78 rpm records of any style of music or speech. The records are cleaned and cataloged by a team of assistants that he has recruited but he is acquiring new material faster than they can work and only 250,000 records have been processed so far. He keeps 100,000 records at home. The collection includes many rarities such as "Heartache Souvenirs"/"Chicken Shack" by William Powell, but it also includes up to 30% duplication. Those duplicates are now beginning to be sold off. Ten thousand Brazilian records were given to the ARChive of Contemporary Music where they form the Zero Freitas Brazilian Music Collection.

As Freitas has become well known, collectors have begun to offer him their collections. In October 2014 alone he acquired one million records from another collector for 200,000 reais. In 2015, Terence McEwan of the San Francisco Opera gave Freitas 6,500 classical LPs. Freitas continues to maintain agents around the world, including in Mexico, New York and Nigeria. These enable him to buy a diverse range of material such as the collection of the late Bob Hope and the 100,000 albums of Cuban music he has acquired. His staff joke that the island of Cuba must be rising due to the weight of material that Freitas has removed.

== Future plans ==
Freitas is building a warehouse to store his collection which he plans to call the Emporium Musical.

== Business activities ==
In addition to transport, Freitas runs a business providing audiovisual systems for concerts and other public events.

== See also ==
- List of record collectors
- LP record
- Music of Brazil
