= Record-Rama =

Former record and CD store in Pittsburgh, Pennsylvania, United States

- Type: Private
- Industry: Music retailer
- Founder: Paul C. Mawhinney
- Headquarters: Ross Township, Pennsylvania, United States
- Area served: North America
- Key people: Paul C. Mawhinney
- Products: Records, cassettes and CDs
- Owner: Paul C. Mawhinney
- Website: RecordRama.com at the Wayback Machine (archived December 8, 2015)

Record-Rama was a record and CD store in Ross Township, Pennsylvania, United States. It was founded by Paul C. Mawhinney, who claimed he built the world's biggest record collection.

== Beginnings ==
Record-Rama was founded by Paul C. Mawhinney, a collector of vinyl records. He opened the store in 1968 in Ross Township, Pennsylvania. According to the store's website, Mawhinney was a significant help in restarting David Bowie's career by getting fellow Pittsburgher and RCA boss Tom Cossie to re-release the album Space Oddity in 1972 after its initial release in 1969 failed to hit. Mawhinney started the shop after his personal collection reached the many thousands. It was his wife who told him to get rid of the records or start a business around them.

By the mid-1990s, Record-Rama was doing $5 million ($10.9 million today) a year of business. In the years that followed, Mawhinney built what he claimed was the world's biggest record collection. He also cataloged records in a directory called the MusicMaster. Mawhinney released the first edition in 1982, and it came in two volumes: one listing by artist, the other by title. By 2003, the business had dropped to $500,000 a year, one tenth of what it had been. Mawhinney attributed the drop in sales to large retailers who were able to sell recorded music below cost and illegal Internet downloading.

== Closure ==
Record-Rama closed in the summer of 2008 during the 2008 financial crisis. Mawhinney stated that he had been squeezed out of business by the recording industry and large retailers who can sell compact discs to the public for less than its wholesale costs.

== The biggest record collection on Earth ==
Mawhinney started his record collection in 1951. The first record he bought was Frankie Laine's "Jezebel". Mawhinney built his collection into the thousands before he founded Record-Rama. After he set up shop, he decided to keep and archive one copy of every record he sold. In 2003, at over 2 million items, Mawhinney's collection was more than twice the size of the collection at the Library of Congress. By the time the store closed in 2008, the collection stood at more than three million items and was valued at $50 million ($74.8 million today).

== Attempts to sell ==
Mawhinney first attempted to sell the collection in 1997. According to the owner, CD Now offered $28.5 million ($57.2 million today) for the collection plus a $100,000/year job ($200,560 today) to Mawhinney to administer the archive. Mawhinney claims the sale fell through three weeks later when CD Now went to bankruptcy court.

In the fall of 2002, Mawhinney and the Library of Congress were actively discussing the sale of Mawhinney's collection. The parties were unable to reach an agreement due to the scarcity of federal funding and difficulties justifying the purchase using taxpayer dollars.

In 2008, Mawhinney closed his shop and needed to sell the record archive. Mawhinney listed the collection for sale on eBay in February 2008. He received a winning bid of $3,002,150 ($4.49 million today) from a buyer in Ireland. A few days later, however, eBay suspended the bidder's account and advised Mawhinney that the bid was not legitimate. Mawhinney relisted the collection in March 2008 but it did not sell.

By 2012, Mawhinney had sold various sections of the archive and various formats to other interested individuals. The remains of a once-great collection were housed in a number of storage units that were in danger of being auctioned off due to the cost of maintenance by somebody on a fixed income with no retirement funds.

Plans for preservation of the archive were set in motion by Audio Preservation Fund in 2012 with the intent to open a museum, online database, and shop under the name The Worlds Greatest Music Collection. Efforts to raise funds to purchase the collection failed, and the Audio Preservation Fund and Mawhinney parted ways when, once again, the prospector went out of business.

== Sale ==
In 2013, a friend of Mawhinney's told him about a classified ad in Billboard Magazine: "RECORD COLLECTIONS. We BUY any record collection. Any style of music. We pay HIGHER prices than anyone else." Mawhinney made contact with the buyer's agent, and in the fall of 2013, eight 16 meter long semis pulled up to Mawhinney's warehouse and departed with what remained of the archive. The buyer was Zero Freitas of São Paulo, Brazil, a Brazilian bus magnate. As of August 2014, Freitas had 17 interns cataloging and recording 500 records a day, and he planned to open an online museum.
