= Dark Round the Edges =

Studio album by Dark
- Released: 1972
- Recorded: 9–13 July 1972
- Studios: S.I.S. Studios, Northampton
- Genres: Hard rock, psychedelic rock, folk rock
- Length: 37:59
- Label: S.I.S. Records
- Producer: Steve Giles

Dark Round the Edges (Note: The album title is Dark on the first CD reissue, released by Kissing Spell in 1992.) is the first album by the British psychedelic rock group Dark, released in 1972. The original edition is considered to be a "holy grail" for record collectors.

== Release ==
The album was originally released in an edition of 64 copies. (Note: According to Steve Giles, the following are the number of different versions made: 12 colour gatefolds, 2 'special' colour gatefolds, 1 white doodle on sleeve, 12 black and white gatefolds and 37 black and white single sleeves.) Most copies were given away to family and close friends of the band, but some were sold. It is now considered to be one of the most valuable records, with original copies having been sold for prices upwards of £6,000 and £25,000, depending on the version. In 2016, it was listed as the 17th most valuable record of all time by NME.

The album has been reissued several times.

== Reception ==
Professional ratings
Review scores
Source	Rating
AllMusic	3.0/5 stars
The Lama Reviews	7/10

Richie Unterberger of AllMusic commented that the songs were "largely vehicles for some involved, fuzzy hard rock guitar soloing" and compared the "softer parts" to Jefferson Airplane and The Grateful Dead.

== Track listing ==
Side A
No.	Title	Writer(s)	Length
1.	"Darkside"	Steve Giles, Ronald Johnson, Clive Thorneycroft	7:28
2.	"Maypole"	Giles	5:03
3.	"Live for Today"	Giles, Johnson, Thorneycroft, Martin Weaver	8:07

Side B
No.	Title	Writer(s)	Length
4.	"R.C. 8"	Giles	5:05
5.	"The Cat"	Giles, Johnson, Thorneycroft	5:19
6.	"Zero Time"	Giles, Johnson, Thorneycroft	6:49

== Personnel ==
Adapted from the back cover of Dark Around the Edges.

Dark

- Steve Giles – vocals, guitar, producer
- Martin Weaver – guitar
- Ronald Johnson – bass guitar
- Clive Thorneycroft – drums

Production and additional personnel

- Alan Bowley – recording engineer
- Steve Giles – photography, design
