= George Blood, L.P. =

George Blood, L.P. is an American company specializing in audio and moving image preservation, digitization, and data migration based in Fort Washington, Pennsylvania. The facility digitizes in 200+ formats, serving as a vendor for museums, libraries and archives, colleges and universities, film and record companies, and others engaging in preservation.

George Blood initially founded Safe Sound Archive in Chestnut Hill, Philadelphia in 1992 to house The Philadelphia Orchestra’s recordings, where he served as recording engineer for 21 years. In 2018, operations moved to Fort Washington, Pennsylvania.

The company is known for The Great 78 Project, partnering to digitize the Internet Archive’s 78 RPM vinyl collection, estimated at 400,000 records.

== George Blood ==
George Blood is an American audio engineer and audiovisual preservationist and CEO of George Blood, L.P. Blood graduated from The University of Chicago in 1983 with a B.A. in Music Theory. He was a producer at the radio station WFMT-FM 1984-1989, recording and editing syndicated programs.

- Blood, G. (2015). A Race Against Time: Best Practices for Preservation Digitization of Video. Against the Grain, 27(4), 12.
- Blood, G. (2017, August). Findings from the Digitization of 78 rpm Discs. In Sustainable Audiovisual Collections Through Collaboration: Proceedings of the 2016 Joint Technical Symposium (p. 72). Indiana University Press.
