= Do Not Sell At Any Price =

2014 nonfiction book on vinyl record collecting

Do Not Sell At Any Price: The Wild, Obsessive Hunt for the World's Rarest 78rpm Records
- Author: Amanda Petrusich
- Language: English
- Subject: Record collecting
- Publisher: Scribner
- Publication date: July 8, 2014
- Media type: Print, Ebook
- Pages: 272
- ISBN: 978-1-4516-6705-9
- Website: Do Not Sell At Any Price

Do Not Sell At Any Price: The Wild, Obsessive Hunt for the World's Rarest 78rpm Records is a 2014 book by American music journalist Amanda Petrusich.

== Development and publication ==
Do Not Sell At Any Price grew out of research for a piece Petrusich wrote for Spin circa 2010; in reporting on the renewed commercial interest in vinyl records, she met collector John Heneghan and became interested in the project of record collecting. As a critic inundated by new music seeking review, she was intrigued by the scarcity that drove collectors of 78s.

Petrusich published the 272-page book with Scribner on July 8, 2014.

== Reception ==
Do Not Sell At Any Price was widely and favorably reviewed. Randall Roberts described the book in the Los Angeles Times as a "thoughtful, entertaining history of obsessed music collectors and their quest for rare early 78 rpm records." In Flavorwire, Jillian Mapes says Petrusich "captures the...weird beauty and legitimate historical importance" of collecting physical records: "This book will make you consider, and possibly rethink, digital music culture." Writing in Paste Magazine, Elias Leight says that even in the context of Petrusich's "stellar resume", Do Not Sell At Any Price may be "her most compelling and inventive [work] yet."
