= Antony C. Sutton =

British-American researcher (1925–2002)

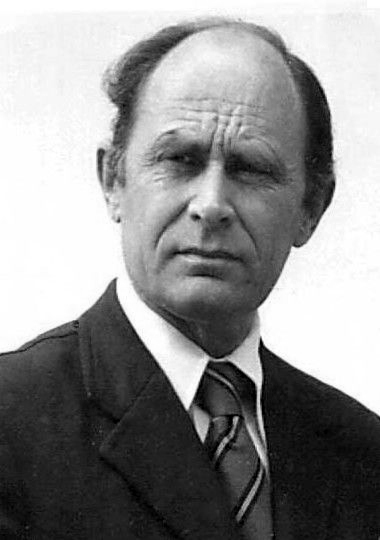
- Born: Antony Cyril Sutton; February 14, 1925; London, United Kingdom
- Died: June 17, 2002 (aged 77); Reno, Nevada, United States
- Education: University of Southampton
- Occupations: Researcher, writer
- Writing career
- Genre: Non-fiction
- Subjects: History, economics, politics
- Website: antonysutton.com

Signature
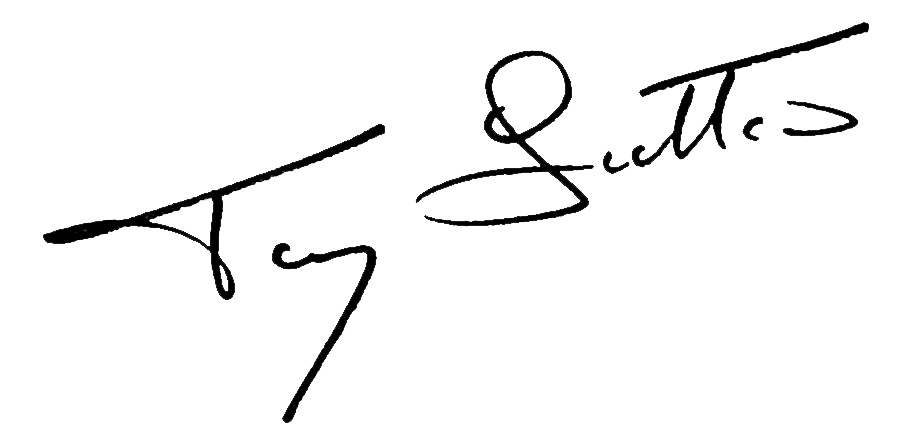

Antony Cyril Sutton (February 14, 1925 – June 17, 2002) was a British-American writer, researcher, economist, and professor.

== Early life and education ==
Antony C. Sutton was born in London on February 14, 1925 to Edward Ceril Sutton and Marjorie Sutton, maiden name Burrett. The family relocated to California in 1957 with Antony and two of his siblings, and he became a U.S. citizen in 1962.

Sutton studied at the University of London, the University of Göttingen, and the University of California, Los Angeles, and received his D.Sc. from the University of Southampton.

== Career ==
Sutton became an economics professor at California State University, Los Angeles. He had a research fellowship at Stanford University's Hoover Institution on War, Revolution, and Peace from 1968 to 1973.

At the Hoover Institution, he wrote the study Western Technology and Soviet Economic Development (in three volumes), arguing that the West played a major role in developing the Soviet Union from its beginnings until the then-present year of 1970. Sutton argued that the Soviet Union's technological and manufacturing base, which was then engaged in supplying North Vietnam during the Vietnam War, was built by United States corporations and largely funded by US taxpayers. Steel and iron plants, the GAZ automobile factory, a Ford subsidiary in eastern Russia, and many other Soviet industrial enterprises were built with the help or technical assistance of the United States government or US corporations. He argued further that the Soviet Union's acquisition of MIRV technology was made possible by receiving (from US sources) machining equipment for the manufacture of precision ball bearings, necessary to mass-produce MIRV-enabled missiles.

Ayn Rand advertised the first volume of the book for sale in The Objectivist Book Service for $9 alongside a review of the work by Robert Hessen that she published in The Objectivist.

He contributed articles to Human Events, Review of the News, Triumph, Ordnance, The Proceedings, and other journals.

In early 1972, U.S. Senator John Tunney received an inquiry from Sutton regarding the rumor that Zhou Enlai was involved in the murder of a family of six in the 1930s.

In 1973, Sutton published a popularized, condensed version of the sections of the forthcoming third volume relevant to military technology called National Suicide: Military Aid to the Soviet Union. Sutton and his associates have claimed that Sutton was forced out of the Hoover Institution for this. His conclusion from his research on the issue was that the conflicts of the Cold War were “not fought to restrain communism” but were organised in order “to generate multibillion-dollar armaments contracts”, since the United States, through financing the Soviet Union “directly or indirectly, armed both sides in at least Korea and Vietnam.”

The update to the text, The Best Enemy Money Can Buy, looked at the role of military technology transfers up to the 1980s.

Sutton's next three published books (Wall Street and the Bolshevik Revolution, Wall Street and FDR and Wall Street and the Rise of Hitler) argued that Wall Street's involvement in the Bolshevik Revolution was to destroy Russia as an economic competitor and turn it into “a captive market and a technical colony to be exploited by a few high-powered American financiers and the corporations under their control” as well as its decisive contributions to the rise of Adolf Hitler and Franklin Delano Roosevelt, whose policies he assessed as being essentially the same “corporate socialism,” planned by the big corporations. Sutton concluded that it was all part of the economic power elites' “long-range program of nurturing collectivism” and fostering “corporate socialism” in order to ensure “monopoly acquisition of wealth” because it “would fade away if it were exposed to the activity of a free market.”

In his view, the only solution to prevent such abuse in the future was that “a majority of individuals declares or acts as if it wants nothing from government, declares it will look after its own welfare and interests” or, specifically, if “a majority finds the moral courage and the internal fortitude to reject the something-for-nothing con game and replace it by voluntary associations, voluntary communes, or local rule and decentralized societies.”

In the early 1980s, Sutton used a combination of public-domain information on Skull and Bones (such as Yale yearbooks) and previously unreleased documents sent to him by Charlotte Thomson Iserbyt whose father was a Skull and Bones member to write America's Secret Establishment: An Introduction to the Order of Skull and Bones, which, according to Sutton, was his most important work.

The Hoover Institution Archives at Stanford University house four boxes of Sutton's personal papers from 1920 (?) to 1972. The collection includes writings, clippings, letters, and notes related to the outbreak of wars, civil wars, revolutions and other violent conflicts around the globe from 1820 to 1970. There is a particular emphasis on the life and career of American entrepreneur Armand Hammer and his business investments and operations in the Soviet Union.

Sutton died in Reno, Nevada on June 17, 2002.

== Reception ==
Sutton's works have received criticisms from academics, particularly his Wall Street trilogy (Wall Street and the Bolshevik Revolution, Wall Street and FDR, and Wall Street and the Rise of Hitler)". A contemporary review of Sutton's Wall Street and the Bolshevik Revolution, researcher Virgil D. Medlin of Oklahoma City University reported finding numerous factual errors in the book and claimed that Sutton repeated "unsubstantiated allegations [and came to] unwarranted conclusions." Medlin also wrote that Sutton made use of dubious sources, such as rumor and uncorroborated inquiries, as "documentary proof of [his] allegations."

Howard Dickman of the Manhattan Institute for Policy Research referred to Sutton's Wall Street and FDR as a "weak specimen of conspiracy history" that was "poorly written and edited, digressive, repetitious, disorganized, and unconvincing."

Sutton's Western Technology and Soviet Economic Development, 1945 to 1965, also received criticism, specifically its thesis. Dr. Samuel Lieberstein of Temple University had initially praised the first two volumes of the study but later came to criticize it in his review of the third volume, stating that Sutton failed to note instances of Soviet technological innovation and ignored positive aspects of the USSR's planned economy that seemed to conflict with his thesis. British historian Richard C. Thurlow also criticized Sutton's thesis, writing that "all nations were dependent on international trade for economic development and their industrial infrastructure, including the United States" adding that Sutton "totally [disregarded] alternative explanations of Soviet industrialization".

Writing in the Journal of Libertarian Studies, T. Hunt Tooley, professor of history at Austin College of Sherman, Texas, said Sutton was the most important of the conservative and libertarian writers who "took up the subject of the bankers from the 1960s, bringing to paleoconservative and libertarian audiences a highly critical picture of bankers and their influence".

== Bibliography ==
=== Books ===
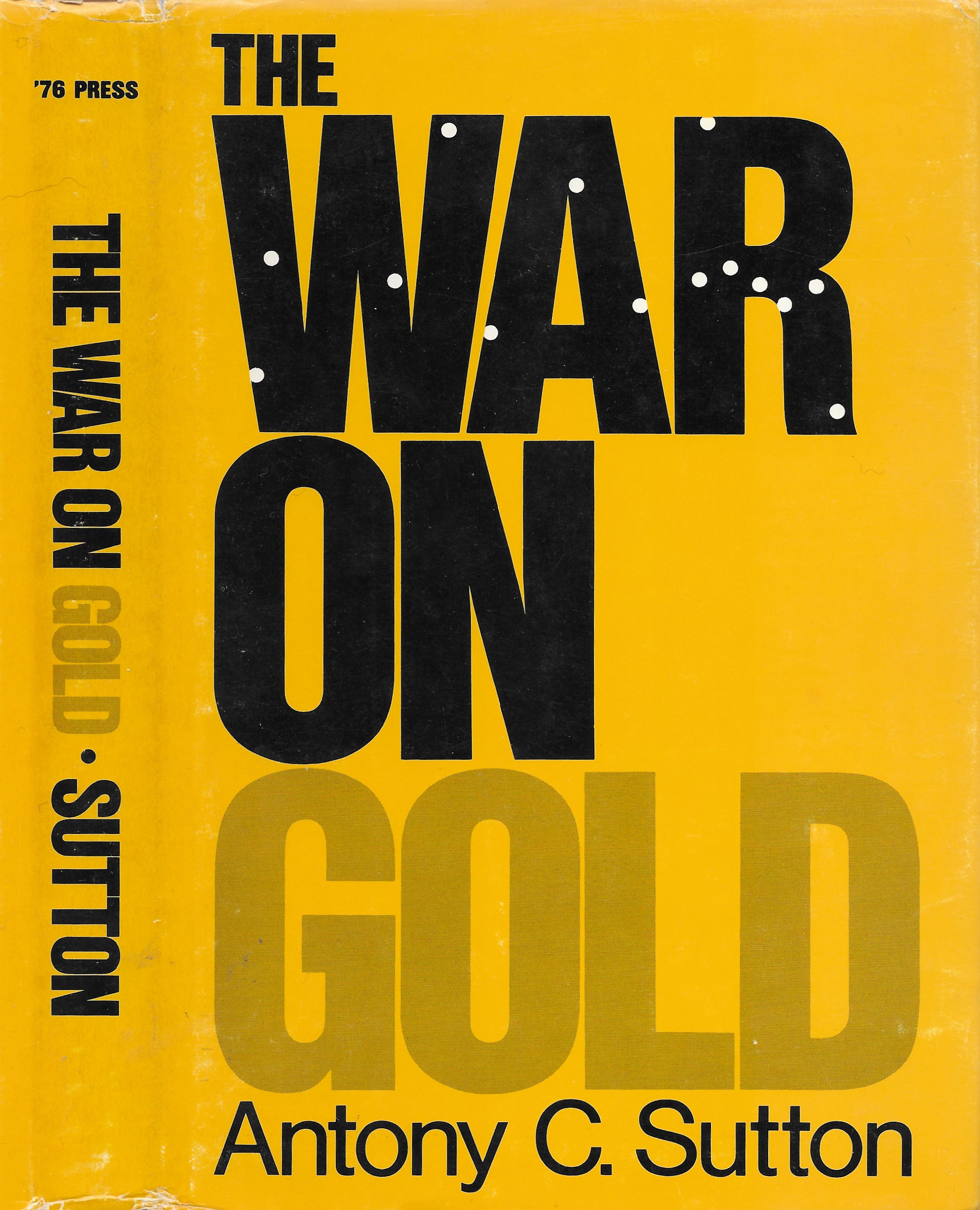
Sutton's 1976 study of "the past, present, and future of the metal that Keynesian economists and political schemers have denounced as a 'barbaric relic.'"

- Western Technology and Soviet Economic Development, 1917–1930. Stanford, Calif.: Hoover Institution (1968)
- Western Technology and Soviet Economic Development, 1930–1945. Stanford, Calif.: Hoover Institution (1971)
- Western Technology and Soviet Economic Development, 1945–1965. Stanford, Calif.: Hoover Institution (1973)
- National Suicide: Military Aid to the Soviet Union. New Rochelle, NY: Arlington House (1973)
- Wars and Revolutions: A Comprehensive List of Conflicts, Including Fatalities, Part One: 1820 to 1900. Stanford, Calif.: Hoover Institution (1973)
- Wars and Revolutions: A Comprehensive List of Conflicts, Including Fatalities, Part Two: 1900 to 1972. Stanford, Calif.: Hoover Institution (1973)
- Wall Street and the Bolshevik Revolution. New Rochelle, NY: Arlington House (1974)
- Wall Street and FDR. New Rochelle, NY: Arlington House (1975)
- Wall Street and the Rise of Hitler. Seal Beach, Calif.: '76 Press (1976)
- The War on Gold. Seal Beach, Calif.: '76 Press (1977)
- Energy: The Created Crisis. New York: Books in Focus (1979)
- The Diamond Connection: A Manual for Investors. Future Technology Intelligence Report (1979)
- Trilaterals Over Washington, Vol. 1. Scottsdale, Ariz.: August Corporation (1979). Co-authored with Patrick M. Wood.
- Trilaterals Over Washington, Vol. 2. Scottsdale, Ariz.: August Corporation (1980). Co-authored with Patrick M. Wood.
- The Paper Factory (1980)
- Gold vs Paper: A Cartoon History of Inflation. Phoenix, Ariz.: Phoenix International Publications (1981)
- Investing in Platinum Metals. Metairie, LA: Adam Smith Publishing (1982)
- Technological Treason: A Catalog of U.S. Firms with Soviet Contracts, 1917–1982. Phoenix, Ariz.: Research Publications (1982)
- America's Secret Establishment: An Introduction to the Order of Skull & Bones. Originally published 1983 by Liberty House Press; republished in 2002 by TrineDay: Walterville, Oregon
- An Introduction to the Order. Phoenix, Ariz.: Research Publications (1983)
- The Secret Cult of the Order. Seal Beach, Calif.: Concord Books (1983). ISBN 978-0949667199.
- How the Order Controls Education. Seal Beach, Calif.: Concord Books (1985)
- How the Order Creates War and Revolution. San Pedro, Calif.: GSG & Associates (1985)
- The Best Enemy Money Can Buy. Billings, Montana: Liberty House Press (1986)
- Two Faces of George Bush. Dresden, New York: Wiswell Ruffin House (1988)
- The Federal Reserve Conspiracy. Boring, Oreg.: CPA Book Publishers (1995)
- Trilaterals Over America. Boring, Oreg.: CPA Book Publishers (1995)
- Gold For Survival. Boring, Oreg.: CPA Book Publishers (1996)
- Cold Fusion: Secret Energy Revolution. Future Technology Intelligence Report (1997)
- The View from 4-Space. Future Technology Intelligence Report (1998)

=== Newsletters ===
- Phoenix Letter: A Report on the Abuse of Power (1982-1997). OCLC 35676184.
  - Phoenix, Arizona: Research Publications.
  - Billings, Montana: Liberty House Press (November 1988-).
- Future Technology Intelligence Report (FTIR). (1990-2002). ISSN 1523-5807.

=== Congressional testimony ===
- "Statement of Antony C. Sutton, Former Research Fellow, Hoover Institution on War, Revolution and Peace, Stanford University" (April 24, 1974). International Economic Policy: Hearings Before the Subcommittee on International Trade of the Committee on Banking and Currency. House of Representatives, Ninety-Third Congress, Second Session. April 22–26, 29-30; May 1–2. Washington, D.C.: Government Printing Office, 1974, pp. 155–166. OCLC 899744169

=== Film appearances ===
Archive footage of Sutton was used in the 2014 documentary, JFK to 9/11: Everything Is a Rich Man's Trick. According to Sutton, a Dutch TV production company interviewed him for a documentary on Skull and Bones in the 1990s, but it was not aired.

== See also ==
- Military funding of science
- Power elite
