= Arlington House Publishers =

American publisher (1964–1988)

- Status: Active
- Founded: 1964
- Founder: Neil McCaffrey Jr.
- Successor: Crown Publishing
- Country of origin: United States
- Publication types: books

Arlington House, Inc. (doing business as Arlington House Publishers), now-defunct, was an American book publisher of jazz discographies, as well as conservative and anti-communist titles. It was a Delaware corporation from 1964 to 1988 with offices in New Rochelle and New York City and, in 1981, Westport, Connecticut.

== History of corporate structure ==
- In 1968, Computer Applications, Inc. acquired the businesses of Arlington House, Inc., and its affiliated companies, Conservative Book Club, Inc., and Nostalgia Book Club, Inc., all of New Rochelle, for approximately $1.5 million in stock. The acquired firms continued to operate under then current management as part of the direct mail/graphic arts and publishing division of Computer Applications, Inc. (CAI).
- Arlington House was later acquired by Starr Broadcasting, which was sold to Shamrock Broadcasting in 1979. Shamrock sold Arlington House to Crown Publishing in 1981.

== Selected books published ==
=== Politics, economics, & conservatism ===
- Bartlett, Bruce R. Reaganomics: Supply Side Economics in Action (1981)
- Brown, Harold O. J. The Reconstruction of the Republic (1977)
- Carrington, Frank G. Neither Cruel nor Unusual: The Case for Capital Punishment (1978)
- Carroll, John Alexander, and Odie B. Faulk. Home of the Brave: A Patriot's Guide to American History (1976)
- Cohen, Bernard Lande. Law Without Order: Capital Punishment and the Liberals (1970)
- Colby, Benjamin. 'T’was a Famous Victory: Deception and Propaganda in War with Germany (1975)
- Davies, Michael. Liturgical Revolution, Part 2: Pope John's Council (1977)
- Edwards, Lee. You Can Make the Difference (1980)
- Fanning, Louis A. Betrayal in Vietnam (1976)
- Farr, Finis. Fair Enough: The Life of Westbrook Pegler (1975)
- Gill, William J. The Ordeal of Otto Otepka (1969)
- Gavin, William F. Street Corner Conservative (1975)
- Gerber, Michele Stenehjem. An American First: John T. Flynn and the America First Committee (1976)
- Hazlitt, Henry. A New Constitution Now (1974)
- Hazlitt, Henry. Economics in One Lesson (1979)
- Herschensohn, Bruce. The Gods of Antenna (1976)
- Hicken, Victor. The World is Coming to an End!: An Irreverent Look at Modern Doomsayers (1975)
- Holt, Thomas J. Total Investing (1976)
- Huggins, Hal A. Why Raise Ugly Kids?: Fulfill Your Child's Health and Happiness Potential (1981)
- Hutton, Joseph Bernard The subverters: former Czech communist official reveals the communist plot to subvert the West and spells out, for the first time, the actual techniques being used right now (1972)
- James, Peter N. Soviet Conquest from Space (1974)
- Kubek, Anthony. The Red China Papers: What Americans Deserve to Know About U.S.-Chinese Relations (1975)
- Lambro, Donald. The Conscience of a Young Conservative (1976)
- Lane, Thomas A. The Breakdown of the Old Politics (1974)
- Lee, Albert. Slumlord! The True Story of the Man Who Is Beating America's Biggest Problem (1976)
- Lester, William (Fr.) S.J. iarchive:Morality Anyone/DxovAAAAYAAJ ''Morality, Anyone?'' (1975)
- Levine, Isaac Don. Plain Talk: An Anthology from the Leading Anti-Communist Magazine of the 40s? (1976)
- Machan, Tibor R. The Pseudo-Science of B.F. Skinner (1974)
- Mencken, H. L., and Theo Lippman, Jr. (ed). A Gang of Pecksniffs: and Other Comments on Newspaper Publishers, Editors and Reporters (1975)
- Molnar, Thomas Steven. Authority and Its Enemies (1976)
- Newman, John Henry, and Charles Frederick Harrold. A Newman Treasury: Selections from the Prose Works (1975)
- North, Gary. None Dare Call It Witchcraft (1976)
- Paris, Alexander Perry. The Coming Credit Collapse: An Update for the 1980s (1980)
- Phillips, Kevin P. The Emerging Republican Majority (1969)
- Rothbard, Murray Newton, and Leonard P Liggio. A New Land, a New People: The American Colonies in the Seventeenth Century (1975)
- Rothbard, Murray Newton, and Leonard P Liggio. Conceived in Liberty (1975)
- Rothbard, Murray Newton. Advance to Revolution, 1760-1775 (1976)
- Rusher, William A. Special Counsel: An Inside Report on the Senate Investigations into Communism (1968)
- Schiller, Craig. The (Guilty) Conscience of a Conservative (1978)
- Schlafly, Phyllis, and Chester Charles Ward. Kissinger on the Couch (1975)
- Schiff, Irwin A. The Biggest Con: How the Government is Fleecing You (1976)
- Schultz, Harry D. Panics & Crashes: How You Can Make Money Out of Them (1980)
- Shaman, Robert A. Poison-proof Your Body!: Food, Pollution, and Your Health (1980)
- Sutton, Antony C. Wall Street and the Bolshevik Revolution (1974)
- Sutton, Antony C. Wall Street and FDR (1975)
- Taylor, Robert B. Doctor Taylor's Guide to Healthy Skin for All Ages (1974)
- de Toledano, Ralph. Hit and Run: The Rise—and Fall?—of Ralph Nader (1975)
- Tuccille, Jerome. Who's Afraid of 1984? (1975)
- Wright, Charlotte. America's Emerging Fascist Economy (1975)
- Fails, Wayne (ed). The Future Under President Reagan (1981)
- von Mises, Ludwig. A Critique of Interventionism: Inquiries Into the Economic Policy and the Economic Ideology of the Present. Translation and introduction by Hans F. Sennholz. (1977)
- Weyl, Nathaniel. Karl Marx: Racist (1979)
- Wheeler, Richard Shaw. Pegans in the Pulpit (1974)
- Whelan, James R. Allende: Death of a Marxist Dream (1981)
- Whitney, Victor P. How to Beat the Money-Grabbers: The Essentials of Estate Planning (1979)
- Wurmbrand, Richard. My answer to the Moscow Atheists (1975)

=== Arts & entertainment ===
- Alvin H Marill (1934–2010), Movies made for television: the telefeature and the mini-series, 1964–1979 (1980)
- Bill Libby, They didn't win the Oscars (1980)
- Brian A. L. Rust, Abe Lyman to Bob Zurke: index of song titles; index of artists (1978)
- Brian A. L. Rust, Irving Aaronson to Abe Lyman (1978)
- Brian A. L. Rust, The American Dance Band Discography 1917–1942 (2 vols) (1975)
- Brian A. L. Rust, Jazz records, 1897–1942 (1978)
- David Ragan, Who's Who in Hollywood 1900–1976 (1977)
- Gabe Essoe (né Gabor Attila Essoe; born 1944), The official book of TV lists (1981)
- James Robert Parish, Hollywood’s great love teams (1974)
- James Robert Parish, The Hollywood Beauties (1978)
- James Robert Parish, The RKO Gals (1974)
- James Robert Parish, The tough guys (1976)
- James Robert Parish, Lennard DeCarl, Hollywood players: the forties (1976)
- Jane Dorner, Fashion in the forties & fifties (1975)
- Garnett, Tay; Balling, Fredda Dudley (1973). Light Your Torches and Pull Up Your Tights. ISBN 978-0-87000-204-5.
- Jeffrey M. Lenburg (born 1956), The Encyclopedia of Animated Cartoon Series (reprint by Da Capo Press) (1981)
- John Milton Hagen (né Milton Abel Hagen; 1892–1977) (author); Feg Murray (illustrator), Holly-would! (1974); OCLC 803258386
- Les Adams & Buck Rainey, Shoot-em-ups: the complete reference guide to Westerns of the sound era (1978)
- Michael G. Fitzgerald, Universal pictures: a panoramic history in words, pictures and filmographies (1977)
- Richard Merrill Sudhalter (1938–2008) & Philip R. Evans (né Philip Roland Evans; 1935–1999), Bix: Man & Legend (1975); OCLC 462382956, 1731083
- Roger Davis Kinkle (1916–2000), The complete encyclopedia of popular music and jazz 1900–1950 (4 vols.) (1974)
- Sheldon Harris, Blues who's who: a biographical dictionary of blues singers (1979)
- Steven Jay Rubin, The James Bond films: a behind the scenes history (1981)
- Ted Sennett (né Theodore Sinitsky; 1928–2006), Warner Brothers Presents: The Most Exciting Years – From The Jazz Singer to White Heat (1971)
- William R. Meyer (1949–1996), The Film Buff's catalog (1979)

== Book series ==
- Architects of Freedom Series
- Chatham River Press Classics (joint publisher: Chatham River Press)
- Conceived In Liberty
- Dollar Growth Library
- Giants of America the Founding Fathers
