= Amanda Petrusich =

American music journalist (born c.1980)

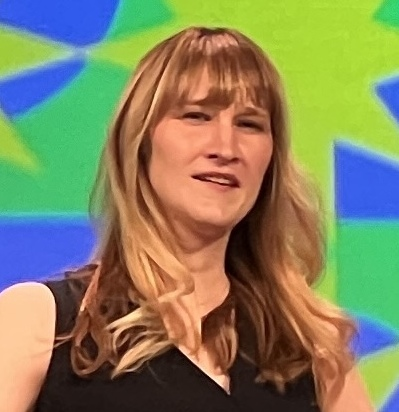
- Petrusich in 2022
- Education: College of William & Mary (BA); Columbia University (MFA)
- Occupation: Music journalist
- Notable work: Pink Moon (2007); It Still Moves (2009); Do Not Sell at Any Price (2014)
- Spouse: Bret Stetka (m. 2005–2022)
- Awards: Guggenheim Fellowship (2016)

Amanda Petrusich (born c. 1980) is an American music journalist. She is a staff writer at The New Yorker and the author of three books: Pink Moon (2007), It Still Moves: Lost Songs, Lost Highways, and the Search for the Next American Music (2008), and Do Not Sell at Any Price: The Wild, Obsessive Hunt for the World's Rarest 78rpm Records (2014).

== Early life ==
Petrusich was born circa 1980 and grew up in the New York area, the child of two public school teachers. Her paternal grandparents are Croatian immigrants. She attended the College of William & Mary, where she was co-editor-in-chief of the William and Mary Review and a reviewer for The Flat Hat, the college's campus newspaper. She graduated with a B.A. in English and film studies in 2000, then earned a master's in nonfiction writing from Columbia University in 2003.

== Career ==
Petrusich has written for The New York Times, Pitchfork Media and Paste. Petrusich has been a staff writer at Pitchfork since 2003, and is a staff writer at The New Yorker. She is the author of Pink Moon, a book on Nick Drake's album of the same name for the 33 1/3 music series, and a 2008 book called It Still Moves: Lost Songs, Lost Highways, and the Search for the Next American Music, which Joe Boyd described in The Guardian as "a terrific piece of travel writing...a tour through the roots of American rural music". Petrusich also wrote a book on record collecting called Do Not Sell At Any Price: The Wild, Obsessive Hunt for the World's Rarest 78rpm Records.

Petrusich serves as clinical assistant professor at the Gallatin School of Individualized Study at NYU. She began teaching at NYU in 2010 and joined the full-time faculty in 2015.

Naming her to its 2016 list of "100 Most Influential People in Brooklyn Culture," Brooklyn Magazine described Petrusich as "a towering force of grace and encouragement in New York music and criticism circles. Between mentoring emerging voices and writing with discernment about music’s most important figures, Petrusich is helping shape Brooklyn culture from the ground up."

Petrusich won a Guggenheim Fellowship in 2016. In 2019, she was nominated for a Grammy Award for the album notes she wrote for Bob Dylan’s Trouble No More box set.

== Personal life ==
Petrusich was married to physician and writer Bret Stetka from 2005 until his death in 2022. They have a daughter, born in 2021.

== Bibliography ==
=== Books ===
- Petrusich, Amanda (2007). Pink moon. 33 1/3. New York: Continuum. (Note: Profiles Nick Drake's 1972 album Pink moon.)
- — (2008). It still moves : lost songs, lost highways, and the search for the next American music. New York: Faber.
- — (2014). Do not sell at any price : the wild, obsessive hunt for the world's rarest 78rpm records.

=== Essays and reporting ===
- Petrusich, Amanda (January 30, 2017). "In retrospect : John Cale's reissued albums feature wild new inventions". The Critics. Pop Music. The New Yorker. 92 (47): 64–67. (Note: Online version is titled "John Cale's inventive retrospection".)
- — (March 13, 2017). "All in : Maggie Rogers's collection of influences". The Critics. Pop Music. The New Yorker. 93 (4): 110–111. (Note: Online version is titled "Maggie Rogers, an artist of her time".)
- — (August 21, 2017). "Think pieces : the meticulous rock of Adam Granduciel and The War on Drugs". The Critics. Pop Music. The New Yorker. 93 (24): 78–79. (Note: Online version is titled "Is The War on Drugs rock's next torchbearer?")
- — (October 30, 2017). "Plenty more : Viceland's visceral gastronomy". The Critics. On Television. The New Yorker. 93 (34): 76–77. (Note: Online version is titled "Action Bronson's expansive appetites".)
- — (December 4, 2017). "Mining gold : how shows about our hidden heirlooms tell us our worth". The Critics. On Television. The New Yorker. 93 (39): 78–79. (Note: Online version is titled "What 'Antiques Roadshow' taught us".)
- — (May 27, 2019). "Hardcore history : Rammstein's heavy and cathartic camp". The Critics. Pop Music. The New Yorker. 95 (14): 63–65. (Note: Online version is titled "Rammstein's heavy and cathartic camp".)
- — (November 18, 2019). "Slippery". The Talk of the Town. Listening Dept. The New Yorker. 95 (36): 23. (Note: Online version is titled "Dax Shepard, anthropology major".)
- — (March 1, 2021). "Love and other drugs : Julien Baker's songs of addiction and redemption". The Critics. Pop Music. The New Yorker. 97 (2): 70–71. (Note: Online version is titled "Julien Baker's songs of addiction and redemption".)
- — (April 25 – May 2, 2022). "Revival : the rousing sounds of Arcade Fire". The Critics. Pop Music. The New Yorker. 98 (10): 74–75. (Note: Online version is titled "Arcade Fire goes back to an old sound for its new record".)
- — (April 21, 2025). "The Portal Opens: For forty years, Phish has jammed—for those with ears to hear". Profiles. The New Yorker. (Note: Online version is titled "After Forty Years, Phish Isn’t Seeking Resolution".)

=== Culture Desk columns on newyorker.com ===
- Petrusich, Amanda (September 1, 2015). "Miley Cyrus's quest for realness". The New Yorker.

=== Postscript columns on newyorker.com ===
- Petrusich, Amanda (January 13, 2020). "The misfit awesomeness of Neil Peart and Rush". The New Yorker.

———————

Bibliography notes
