= Scaramanga Silk =

British music producer

Scaramanga Silk is a London-born, British music producer, DJ, VJ, and author.

== Work ==
Scaramanga Silk has produced singles, EPs and remixes for Micro Spiral Records, Kin Aesthetic Recordings and Adventures in Dubbing. He has also created a number of his own recordings. Silk's work falls into a number of musical genres, including, "breakbeat, electro, ambient, experimental, and techno".

In 2021, a single by Silk, called Choose Your Weapon, sold for a record-breaking £30,000 ($41,095) on record collectors' website, Discogs. It is the site's biggest recorded sale; all the more remarkable as Silk was a relatively unknown artist at the time of the sale.

Discogs was rather perplexed by the sale, and remarked, "By several accounts, the release drew attention from collectors shortly after it dropped [in 2008] when it sold on eBay for $654. How that price tag sky-rocketed to over $40,000 remains a mystery.” Silk was also somewhat puzzled by the record-breaking sale, when he said, “It is very difficult to understand why the release went for that kind of money, as I do not believe that any record is worthy of such a valuation. The individual who made the purchase must have had some kind of special connection to the work too … It means a lot that Choose Your Weapon is so special to somebody.”
