= It Still Moves (book) =

2008 book by Amanda Petrusich

It Still Moves: Lost Songs, Lost Highways, and the Search for the Next American Music
- First edition
- Author: Amanda Petrusich
- Language: English
- Subject: American music
- Publisher: Faber & Faber
- Publication date: August 26, 2008
- Publication place: United States
- Media type: Print
- Pages: 272
- ISBN: 978-0-86547-950-0

It Still Moves: Lost Songs, Lost Highways, and the Search for the Next American Music is a 2008 book by American music journalist Amanda Petrusich.

== Publication ==
The project originated in a piece for Paste Magazine, where Petrusich served as senior contributing editor. She published the 272-page book with Faber & Faber on August 26, 2008.

== Content ==
In The Guardian, Joe Boyd described the book as "a terrific piece of travel writing" and "a tour through the roots of American rural music." Petrusich investigates on the influence of blues on later genres of popular music, beginning with the work of ethnomusicologist Alan Lomax. In The Village Voice, John S.W. MacDonald described the project as "show[ing] us what the current indie-folk scene and its record-collecting twenty- and thirtysomethings...have to do with classic American folk: what bands like Iron and Wine and Califone have inherited from that tradition and what they’ve thrown away. To do all this, [Petrusich] hit the road, heading south in her beat-up Honda Civic to Memphis, Nashville, and Appalachia to find the seeds of folk and the birthplace of rock 'n' roll."

== Reception ==
Reviewing It Still Moves for PopMatters, Derek Beres describes Petrusich as "a passionate writer whose love for music shines through on every page. As she explains early on, she is not concerned with how many records are sold or what tactics artists use in the studio. Her approach is more intangible, hence more emotionally tactile: Who are these people creating this music? What are their dreams, ambitions, philosophies?...This is, in large part, what makes this book so enjoyable—the people behind the songs, not to mention her own personal perceptions of what goes on behind her scenes."
