= Brian Rust =

English jazz discographer (1922–2011)

- Born: Brian Arthur Lovell Rust; 19 March 1922; Golders Green, Middlesex, England
- Died: 5 January 2011 (aged 88); Swanage, Dorset, England
- Occupation: Discographer, broadcaster

Brian Arthur Lovell Rust (19 March 1922 – 5 January 2011) was an English jazz discographer.

== Career ==
Rust was born in 1922 in Golders Green, then part of the Municipal Borough of Hendon in Middlesex. He collected records from the age of five, but his most significant purchase was aged 14, when he acquired a copy of "Ostrich Walk" by the Original Dixieland Jass Band. After leaving school, Rust became a bank clerk. During the Second World War, he was a conscientious objector, and worked as an auxiliary fire officer. After the war, he returned to being a bank clerk.

He worked in the BBC's record library from 1945 to 1960, and supervised broadcasting selections. He contributed to The Gramophone magazine from 1948 to 1970, and wrote freelance from 1960, including liner notes for record releases. During the early 1960s, he was living in Hatch End, Middlesex.

Rust hosted the Mardi Gras radio programme on Capital Radio from 1973 to 1984, in which he played only 78s; his friend Chris Ellis recalled that he sounded like "a cross between an Oxford don and an overgrown schoolboy, always bubbling with enthusiasm". Rust's Jazz Records 1897–1942, revised several times since its publication in 1961, is a standard jazz discography. He moved from London to Swanage, Dorset, in 1970.

Rust died on 5 January 2011 in Swanage, England, aged 88. He was survived by his wife, Mary, and their daughters, Angela and Pamela, and a son, Victor.

== Discographies ==
=== General discographies ===
- Harris, Rex; Rust, Brian (1958). Recorded Jazz: A Critical Guide. Harmondsworth: Pelican Books. LCCN 58-1954.
- Rust, Brian (1972). The Dance Bands. Arlington House Publishers – via Internet Archive (Kahle/Austin Foundation). LCCN 72-172345; ISBN 0-7110-0341-6; ISBN 0-8700-0272-4.
- Rust, Brian (1973). The Complete Entertainment Discography – From the Mid-1890s to 1942 (with Allen G. Debus). Arlington House Publishers – via Internet Archive. LCCN 73-13239; ISBN 0-8700-0150-7.
1. 2nd ed.. Da Capo Press. 1989. LCCN 87-33155; ISBN 0-3067-6210-2.
- Rust, Brian (1975). The American Dance Band Discography, 1917–1942. Arlington House Publishers. LCCN 75-33689; ISBN 0-8700-0248-1.
1. Vol. 1: "Irving Aaronson to Arthur Lange" (2nd printing, June 1979) – via Internet Archive).
2. Vol. 1: "Irving Aaronson to Arthur Lange" (2nd printing, June 1979) – via Google Books (University of Michigan–Flint Library)).
3. Vol. 2: "Arthur Lange to Bob Zurke" – via Internet Archive (Arcadia Fund)).
4. Vol. 2: "Arthur Lange to Bob Zurke" – via Google Books (University of Michigan Library)).
- Rust, Brian (1978). Jazz Records, 1897–1942. LCCN 78-1693 ISBN 978-0-8700-0404-9; ISBN 0-8700-0404-2; OCLC 3649797 (all editions).
1. Vols. 1 & 2 (combined) (6th ed.). Mainspring Press. 2001 – via Internet Archive.
2. Vol. 1. "Irving Aaronson to Abe Lyman" (4th and enlarged ed.). Arlington House Publishers – via Internet Archive (ARChive of Contemporary Music).
3. Vol. 2. "Abe Lyman to Bob Zurke" (4th and enlarged ed.). Arlington House Publishers – via Internet Archive (ARChive of Contemporary Music).
4. Vol. 2. "Abe Lyman to Bob Zurke" (4th and enlarged ed.). Arlington House Publishers – via Internet Archive (Kahle/Austin Foundation).
- Rust, Brian (1979). Discography of Historical Records on Cylinders and 78s. Greenwood Press. LCCN 78-60530; ISBN 0-3132-0561-2.
- Rust, Brian (1990). My Kind of Jazz. Hamish Hamilton (publisher). ISBN 978-0-2411-2791-9 OCLC 22922290 (all editions).
- Rust, Brian (2001). Jazz and Ragtime Records, 1897–1942. LCCN 2002-108671; OCLC 51034976 (all editions).
1. Both Vols. Combined (2 vols. combined into 1 and placed in the public domain) (6th ed.). Mainspring Press – via Internet Archive.
2. Vol. 1 "A–K" – via Google Books (University of Michigan Library).
3. Vol. 2 "L–Z / Index" – via Google Books (University of Michigan Library).

=== Artists' discographies ===
- Allen, Walter C.; Rust, Brian (1955). King Joe Oliver. Sidgwick & Jackson – via Internet Archive (ARChive of Contemporary Music). LCCN 59-24202; OCLC 910148 (all editions).
- Harvey, Clifford M.; Rust, Brian (1964). The Al Bowlly Discography. Hatch End: Rust's Rare Records (publisher). LCCN 65-181; OCLC 870132 (all editions).

=== British discographies ===
- Rust, Brian (1984) [1977]. London Musical Shows on Record, 1897–1976. General Gramophone Publications. LCCN 58-42359 (1894–1954); LCCN 78-307917; ISBN 0-9024-7007-8.
- Rust, Brian (2021) [1979]. British Music Hall on Record (PDF). American Discography Project. LCCN 79-322094; ISBN 978-0-9024-7012-5, 978-0-9024-7007-1, ISBN 0-9024-7012-4, 0-9024-7007-8; OCLC 5991586 (all editions).
- Rust, Brian (1980). Brian Rust's Guide to Discography. Discographies, Number 4. Greenwood Press – via Internet Archive. LCCN 79-6827; ISBN 0-3132-2086-7.
- Rust, Brian (1987). British Dance Bands on Record, 1911 to 1945 (with Sandy Forbes). Harrow, London: General Gramaphone Publications. ISBN 978-0-9024-7015-6, 0-9024-7015-9; OCLC 17951884 (all editions).
- Rust, Brian (1989). Supplement to British Dance Bands on Record, 1911 to 1945. Harrow, London: General Gramaphone Publications. ISBN 978-0-9024-7023-1, 0-9024-7023-X; OCLC 38611071 (all editions).
- Rust, Brian (1989) [1986]. British Dance Bands on Record, 1911 to 1945, and Supplement. Harrow, London: General Gramaphone Publications (reprint of the original 1986 ed., plus a 72 page supplement). ISBN 978-0-9024-7022-4, 0-9024-7022-1; OCLC 20652621 (all editions).

=== Label discographies ===
- The Victor Master Book, 1925–1936 (compiled by Brian Rust; with indexes by Malcolm Shaw and Nevil Skrimshire). Stanhope, New Jersey: W.C. Allen (publisher). 1970. LCCN 74-261997.
- Rust, Brian (1976). The Zonophone Studio House Bands, 1924–1932. Storyville Publications and Co., Ltd. OCLC 7198265 (all editions).
- Rust, Brian (1976). The His Master's Voice Studio House Bands, 1912–1939. Storyville Publications and Co., Ltd. OCLC 16488325 (all editions).
- Rust, Brian (1984) [1978]. The American Record Label Book. Da Capo Press – via Internet Archive (Kahle/Austin Foundation). LCCN 83-18921.
- Laird, Ross; Rust, Brian (2004). Discography of OKeh Records, 1918–1934. Praeger Publishing. LCCN 2003-68986; ISBN 0-3133-1142-0.

== Other work ==
- Dearling, Robert; Dearling, Celia; with Brian Rust (1976). The Guinness Book of Music Facts and Feats. Guinness Superlatives – via Internet Archive (Columbia University Libraries). LCCN 76-383609, LCCN 81-141035 (1981 ed.); ISBN 0-9004-2463-X, ISBN 0-8511-2212-4 (1981 ed.).
