= B. George =

American discographer

- Born: Robert John George; 1949 or 1950 (age 75–76)

Bob George, known professionally as B. George, is the co-founder and executive director of the ARChive of Contemporary Music in New York City. He also published the first comprehensive discographical reference work on punk rock and new wave music and founded the company One Ten Records.

== Education ==
After coming to Ann Arbor in the late 1960s, George attended the University of Michigan College of Art and Design.

George went to New York City in 1974 as a visual arts student at the Whitney Museum Studio Program. From 1975 to 1979, he co-directed performance artist Laurie Anderson's stage show.

== One Ten Records formed ==
In 1977, he formed One Ten Records and released the first commercial compilation of audio work by visual artists—a two record set entitled Airwaves, that included the initial recordings of Laurie Anderson and unreleased work by Meredith Monk. In 1980, he received a National Endowment for the Arts grant to produce recordings by visual artists, and in 1981 released Laurie Anderson’s first single "O Superman". This single went to number two on the UK charts and reached the top 20 in 16 countries. It was eventually released by WEA and has sold close to a million copies worldwide.

== ARChive of Contemporary Music ==
George cofounded the ARChive of Contemporary Music in New York City, which, with over two million sound recordings, the ARC is the largest popular music collection in the United States. The initial donation of 47,000 discs that began ARC's collection came from George himself, who accumulated them in the interval between moving to New York and publishing the International Discography, noted below.

== Publications ==
In 1981, George published the first comprehensive discographical reference work on punk and new wave music, titled Volume, the International Discography of the New Wave. By its second edition in 1982, the book had grown to over 700 pages and was co-published and distributed internationally by Omnibus Press. Volume continues to be the definitive reference guide to this material, cited in The Readers Catalog, England's Dreaming, and many other publications.

== Other career achievements ==
As a consultant, Mr. George selected soundworks for the Paris Biennale in 1981 and 1983, and for New Music America in 1984. From 1982 to 1985, he produced an occasional survey of new American pop and experimental music for the BBC that was broadcast as part of The John Peel Show in the UK. From the mid-to late 1990s, he helped program Arts & Events at NYC's World Financial Center.

George also co-produced singles by Orchestra Jazira (Ghana/UK) and Sonny Okuson (Nigeria). He has written about music for The Village Voice, Playboy, Creem, ELLE, Spin and Billboard. Mr. George was the music editor for Benetton’s Colors Magazine and has done occasional writing about "music & food" for Saveur Magazine. He contributed to the planning of and provided research material for Goodtime Kings by Billy Bergman (Planet Rock/Quarto Books, 1985), the first American book on contemporary African Pop. He has consulted on many film projects including Martin Scorsese’s The Last Temptation of Christ and Goodfellas, Tom Hanks' That Thing You Do, and Jonathan Demme’s Something Wild, Beloved and The Manchurian Candidate. From 1993-1999 Mr. George sat on the Blue Ribbon Awards Committee for ARSC (Association for Recorded Sound Collections) choosing the best music books published, and in '99-00 was a member of the Yahoo Academy, voting on the Internet Life Awards for outstanding websites.

In early 2009 the ARChive partnered with Columbia University to create innovative academic initiatives and online content to help with the study, understanding and enjoyment of popular music from around the world.
