= Record collecting =

Hobby of collecting sound recordings

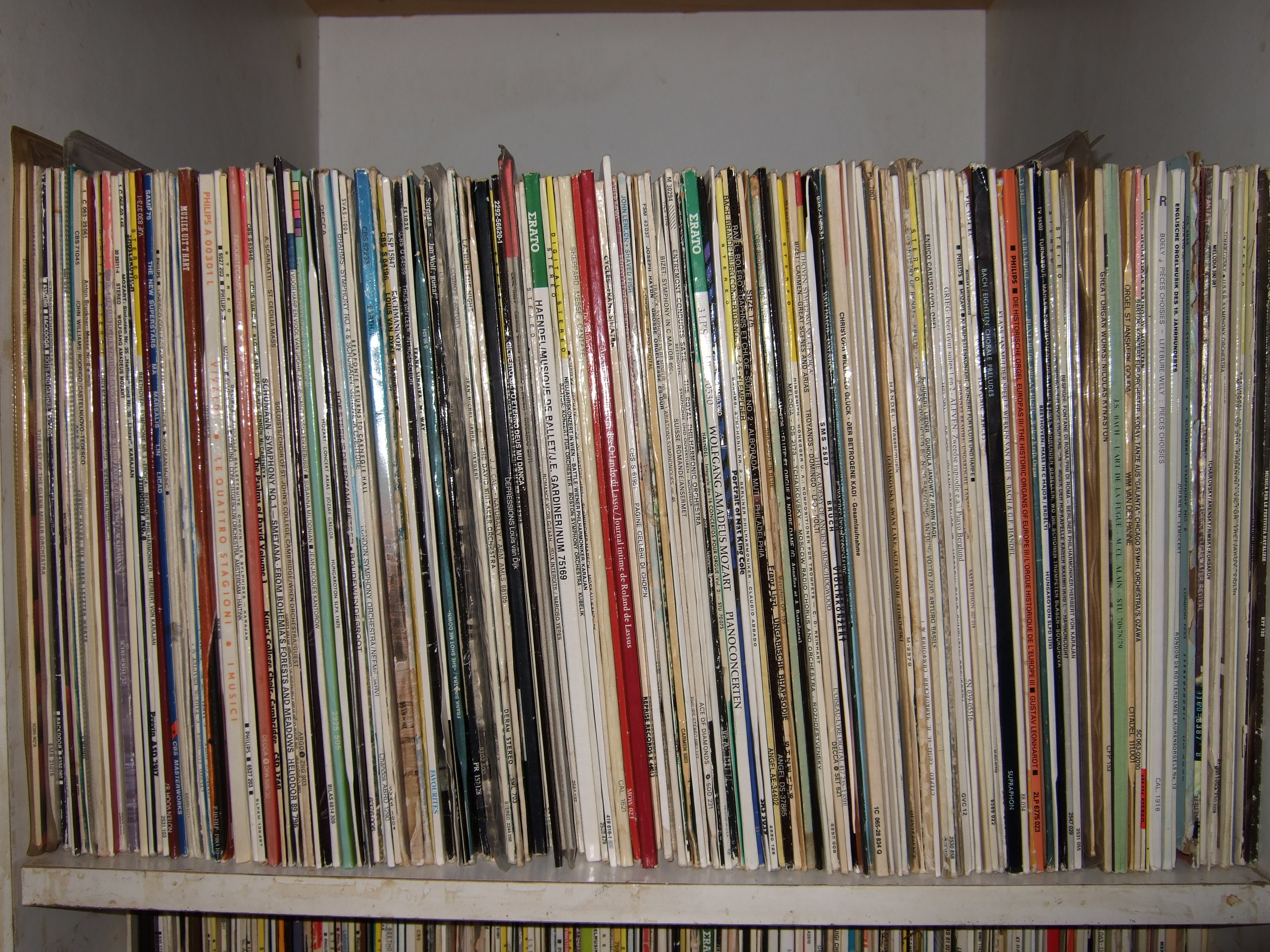
A shelf of collected vinyl records

Record collecting is the hobby of collecting sound recordings, usually of music, but sometimes poetry, reading, historical speeches, and ambient noises. Although the typical focus is on vinyl records, all formats of recorded music can be collected.

== Scope of a record collection ==
The scope of a record collection may include a focus on any of the following categories:

- genres (or subgenres)
- artists (or producers)
- recording labels (or sublabels)
- periods (or music scenes)
- formats, e.g. 78s, 7"s, LPs, EPs, Mono, Reel-to-reel, Cassettes, 45s, SPs, CDs, etc.
- specialisms, e.g. unusual physical specimens (odd shapes, colors, sizes, speeds) regardless of recorded content, records having original "stock" generic sleeves identifying the label, variations in the record's label design as issued by particular companies, or imported copies. Demand is usually highest for the "original" or earliest pressings of records, often identified by variations in the label or cover. Avid collectors develop specialized knowledge about such details.

=== Pressings ===
One collectible record format is known as a test pressing. Five to 10 initial copies are often pressed for the purpose of checking the mix or levels on a record, or to ensure that the die is cutting properly. Though usually meant for the artist, producer, pressing plant, or record label to keep as reference, they are sometimes placed in special packaging (such as a photocopy of the real record sleeve) and given out to friends or devoted fans. First pressings of original commercial releases usually have higher values among collectors than later pressings. Also collectible are 45s with picture sleeves, and original editions of LPs (and other formats) which often have inserts and other features not on subsequent editions, or tracks or cover art later withdrawn or altered. Subsequent pressings often have the same label and catalog number but can be differentiated from the first pressings by the cover, colour of the label, matrix numbers on the disc itself, etc.

=== Errors ===
Records that have been mispressed and have incorrect content or have misprinted labels or covers may be more valuable, especially if a very limited number was released to the public.

=== Promos, reissues and bootlegs ===
Promotional or "promo" copies are free records, cassettes or CDs sent to radio stations, music journalists, and music critics to announce a new release coming soon from the record company. They are identified by the label, which typically takes the form of plain text listing the name of the recording and its associated credits, as well as markings specifying it as "Promotional", "Audition," "Demonstration" and/or "Not for Sale." Record and cassette promo copies typically come in the form of white label records and clear cassettes, respectively, while CD copies typically come in the form of CD-Rs with black-on-transparent labels. Because many commercial cassette releases use identical clear plastic and white print, promo copies are oftentimes distinguished solely by text on the J-card specifying them as such. Promo copies of best-selling records can have a slightly lower or higher value than "stock" first pressings. Occasionally promo copies were pressed for records that were never released; include other songs or features not found on the official commercial release (e.g. Talking Heads' 1988 album Naked).

Reissues of popular records can be released by the same label many years later with the same catalog number and cover art, but are often undertaken by a different label, some of which (such as Rhino Records) specialize in reissues and have access to certain labels' catalogs and "vaults" of unreleased master recordings.

"Bootlegs" are illegitimate releases. They vary in value and in sound and pressing quality, and come in several categories. Bootleg LPs, tapes and CDs often feature recordings from live performances or tracks not commercially released (including those never intended for release that were stolen or illegitimately acquired). Some bootleg 45s are re-releases of rare or valuable singles – exact copies of rare records, with the original label graphics and numbers - known in the industry as "counterfeits."

== History ==
=== Background ===
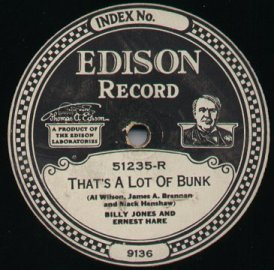
A 1920s Edison Records Diamond Disc label, early 1920s

Record collecting has been around probably nearly as long as recorded sound. In its earliest years, phonographs and the recordings that were played on them (first wax phonograph cylinders, and later flat shellac discs) were mostly owned by the rich, out of the reach of the middle or lower classes. By the 1920s, improvements in the manufacturing processes, both in players and recordings, allowed prices for the machines to drop. While entertainment options in a middle to upper-class home in the 1890s would likely consist of a piano, smaller instruments, and a library of sheet music, by the 1910s and later these options expanded to include a radio and a library of recorded sound.

After the phonograph cylinder became obsolete, the record was the uncontested sound medium for decades. The number of available recordings mushroomed and the number of companies pressing records increased. These were 78rpm, originally one-sided, then later double-sided, ten-inch shellac discs, with about two to three and a half minutes of recording time on each side.

Growth in the recorded sound industries was stunted by the Great Depression and World War II, when the recording industries in some countries were affected by a restricted supply of raw materials. By the time World War II ended, the economy of these countries began to grow again. Classical music (which was a large portion of 78 rpm releases) was slowly edged into a minority status by the influx of popular and new music, which was less costly and thus more profitable to record.

=== Early collecting ===
Music journalist Amanda Petrusich has reported that retrospective 78 collecting began in the 1940s, focusing on rare early Dixieland jazz recordings. In several articles and in her book Do Not Sell At Any Price, she writes about 78 rpm record collectors such as James McKune, an influential collector of jazz from the late 1930s and of country blues.

=== 1950s ===
The introduction of both the 33 1/3 rpm, 12-inch LP record and the 45 rpm, 7-inch record, coming into the market in 1948/1949, provided advances in both storage and quality. These records featured vinyl (polyvinyl chloride or polystyrene), replacing the previous shellac materials. Further groups of small labels came into existence with the dawning of the rock and roll era in the early-to-middle 1950s, and the growth of a market among post-war teenagers with disposable income to spend on 45 rpm singles. Rock and roll was much less costly and more profitable to produce than the big band jazz and professional singer/song-craftsman music that it replaced in popularity.

Ronald D. Cohen relates that the hillbilly-focused Disc Collector magazine was formed in 1951. Various important online library catalogs list copies of Burke's Register of Record Collectors, which existed from 1957 at the latest.

In the United Kingdom, rare 78 rpm records were traded, usually American rock and roll, musicians and record labels such as Little Richard, Chuck Berry, and Sun Records. Labels such as London-American (now London Records), RCA Victor, and Capitol were priced at a premium. One of the earliest UK record collectors was Mike Adams, who was first known for trading in 1958 on Merseyside. He later became a DJ on the BBC and broadcast on collecting records for many years. He wrote several books on collecting including Apple Beatle Collectables. In the UK, labels considered collectible, such as Atlantic Records, Sun Records, Motown, and Parlophone (EMI), turned into mainstream major record labels later on in the 1960s. In the US, New York's Times Square store is widely acknowledged for feeding the doo-wop revival of the early sixties, attention focusing on them from 1959.

=== 1960s ===
With the folk music boom in the late 1950s to early 1960s, there was suddenly a demand for archival material. Record collectors fanned out in some countries, searching small towns, dusty barns and mountain cabins for older discs. Initially, the most-desired items were pre-World War II shellac discs containing "race records" (that is, blues, country blues and hillbilly music), the precursors to then-current rock and roll and country styles. Later generations of record collectors found their passion in digging up obscure 45s in the genre of doo-wop, or LPs from the late 1960s "garage rock" and "psychedelic" genres.

The pop music scene changed with the rise in popularity of The Beatles between 1962 and 1964. In their wake, thousands of musical bands inspired by their fresh, lively take on rock music with a sharp British sensibility, picked up guitars, and many released records. Many of these acolytes released 45 rpm records in small batches to sell at local concerts and to their friends and families. Due to their relatively small pressings, these obscure local records became highly prized and valuable.

One of the famous "collector's items" in record collecting is not a record at all, but merely an album cover. The Beatles themselves accidentally contributed what is probably one of the most well-known and valuable "collector's pieces" of the rock and roll era: "The Butcher Cover". This is an informal title for an album cover for the album Yesterday and Today. Until 1967, the Beatles' LP releases in the UK were substantially different from their LP releases in the USA. These American albums were shorter, had different songs, album titles and artwork.

Another Holy Grail for some collectors is Bob Dylan's The Freewheelin' Bob Dylan, the 1963 pressing that has four songs that were deleted from subsequent pressings, known to fetch up to $35,000 in stereo and $16,500 in mono in excellent condition.

=== 1970s ===
In the 1970s, the record collecting hobby was aided by the establishment of record collecting publications such as Goldmine, DISCoveries, and Stormy Weather, and in the UK, Record Collector. Price guide books were published, codifying exactly how much certain "rare items" were supposed to be worth. The "grading" of records based upon condition became more standardized across the hobby with the publication of these price guides.

=== 1980s and 1990s ===
With the introduction of the compact disc in the middle 1980s, there began a stratification in the hobby; commonly found vinyl specimens that had been pressed in the hundreds of thousands or even millions of copies became relatively worthless, while the rarest of specimens became ever more valuable. These rare items included 45 rpm discs in the genres of blues, rhythm and blues, soul, doo-wop, jazz, progressive rock, and psychedelic rock. Other rare and highly valued items include pieces from highly collectible artists such as The Beatles, Grateful Dead, James Brown, Bob Dylan, Janis Joplin, Jimi Hendrix, The Doors, and The Rolling Stones. Some are pressings from nations where they were pressed in very small quantities (such as the Sex Pistols' South African release of "God Save The Queen"). Thanks to the Hip Hop artists such at A Tribe Called Quest, DJ Premier, Monie Love and others, sampling older records that are household classics for Generation X from genres such as Funk, Jazz curated a dynamic where these records are repackaged & rebirthed for Generation Y.

=== 2000s ===
Even in the 21st century, as music fans have often opted for digital downloads over physical releases (and indeed started to collect these in the same way as vinyl), certain contemporary bands have a following of record collectors. This is prominent for instance in the punk and alternative genres. For example, the special edition of NOFX's 1999 release, The Decline, on transparent vinyl has already reached prices of $1500. Due to the DIY ethic and constrained budget of many punk bands and labels, releases by lesser-known bands tend to be in limited edition. Specific pressing runs of records are sometimes printed on different colored vinyl, have new or different songs, contain spelling or mixing errors, or may be in lower quantity than other pressings. All such factors increase a specific record's collectibility. For instance, in 1988, New York City hardcore band Judge attempted to record their debut Bringin' It Down at Chung King Studios. The bad experience and low quality result left the band so disappointed that they scrapped the session and re-recorded the LP elsewhere. The older sessions, however, were pressed onto 110 copies of white vinyl entitled Chung King Can Suck It! and sent to fans who had pre-ordered Bringin It Down to reward them for their patience, as re-recording caused a major delay in the release. Copies of the record have been sold for up to $6,800 on sites like eBay.

Other music genres also have fervent adherents. For instance, fans of folk rock, psychedelia and other genres have become ever more interested in original short-run vinyl private pressings. Even when these have been reissued, the originals can continue to attract high prices. The first wave of classical collectors concentrated on early stereo orchestral recordings on labels such as the British Decca and EMI, and the American Mercury Records Living Presence series and RCA Victor Living Stereo series. Some of these records still sell at auction for hundreds of dollars. However, the focus of the top classical collectors has now shifted to earlier material, and rare European monos from the 1950s by top artists have become highly sought after. The Far Eastern collectors who dominate this market tend to prefer chamber music, and solo violin and cello. Others still focus on antique 78s.

As of 2011 many pressing plants have been reactivated and new releases in vinyl are appearing on an increasing basis, causing what many have called a revival of the format. The volume of product (9.2 million units sold in 2014, 6 percent of total music sales) confirms a continuing niche interest in the format, while formats such as CDs fail to compete with digital downloads. Sales of cassette music tapes have also increased in recent years (2014–2019) with a cassette tape interest revival almost comparable to vinyl records.

== Crate digging ==
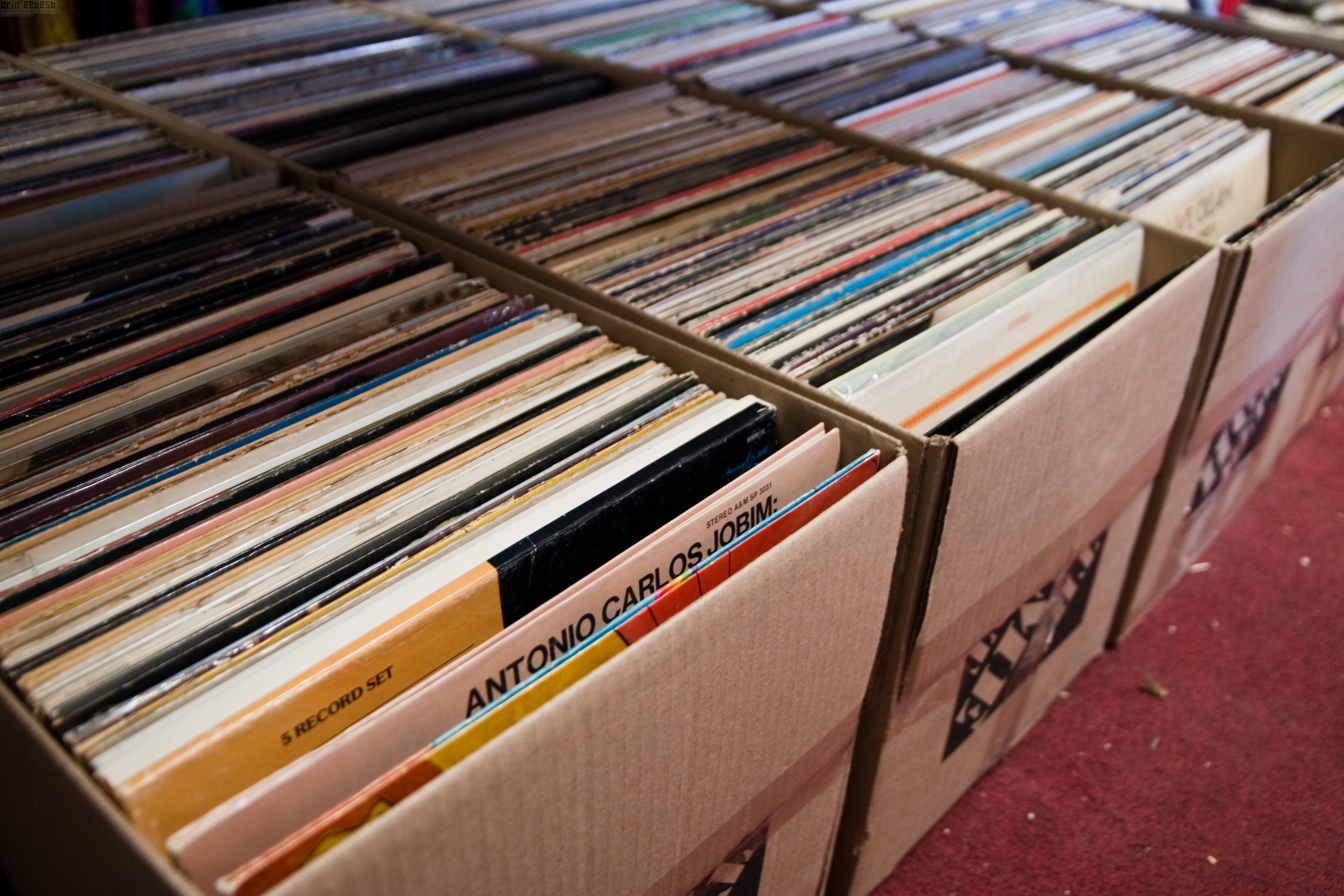
Boxes of vinyl records in a second-hand shop

A more intense method of record collecting, known as crate digging, involves thorough searching of record bins to find a recording of interest. For many collectors, that pursuit becomes a lifelong obsession, driving them to spend countless hours hunting for rare pressings. This practice is associated with and holds a particular prestige for hip hop producers, who searched for rare records with sounds to sample for a newly created recording. In her account of the North American hip-hop crate diggers of the 1980s, media and culture theorist Elodie A. Roy writes, "As they trailed second-hand shops and car boot sales – depositories of unwanted capitalist surplus – diggers were bound to encounter realms of mainstream, mass-produced LP records now fallen out of grace and fashion. They primarily used them as raw material, seeking to create beats out of them." Speaking of crate digging's broader role in hip hop culture, academic and ethnomusicologist Joseph G. Schloss says:

[I]n addition to its practical value in providing the raw material or sample-based hip-hop, digging serves a number of other purposes such as manifesting ties to hip-hop deejaying tradition, 'paying dues', educating producers about various forms of music, and serving as a form of socialization between producers.

While the practice of collecting in general was historically a bourgeoisie phenomenon tied to antiques and the fine arts, the North American hip-hop crate-diggers of the 1980s helped give rise to what material culture scholar Paul Martin calls the "popular collector" – generally interested in "obtainable, affordable and appealing" items and a consequence of mass production. With the rise of digital media in the following decades, this transitioned to the "digital" and "electronic" collector. Concurrently, the demise of physical music stores allowed for websites to emerge as domains for crate digging, including the music review database AllMusic, the streaming service Spotify, and Discogs, which began as a music database before developing into an online marketplace for physical music releases.

== See also ==
- John Peel's Record Box
- Rare groove
- List of notable record collectors
- List of the most valuable records
- Vinyl
- Vinyl revival
- Zero Freitas, a Brazilian businessman whose record collection is believed to be the largest in the world
