= ARChive of Contemporary Music =

Coordinates: 40.71858°N 74.00371°W

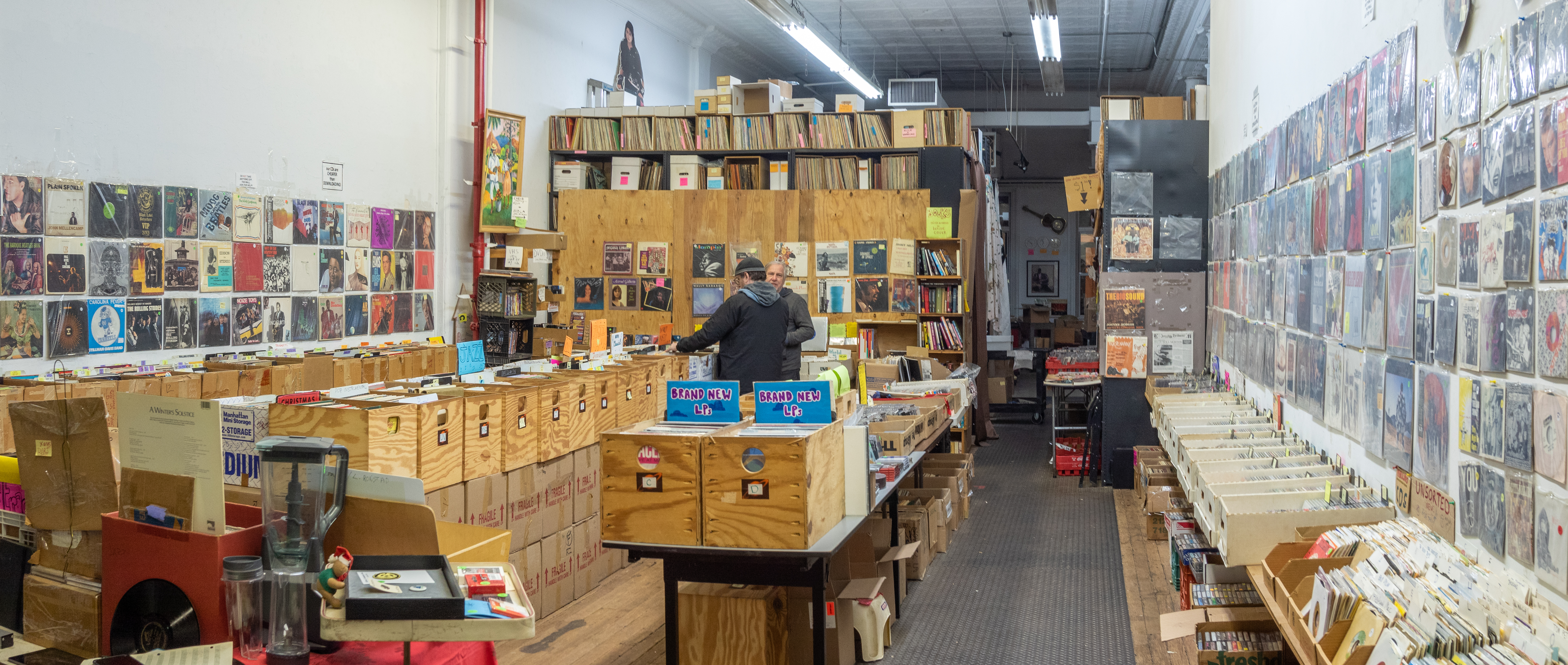
ARC in 2019

The ARChive of Contemporary Music (ARC) is a non-profit music library and archive based in New York City. It contains over five million items.

== People ==
The ARC was founded in 1985 by current Director, B. George and David Wheeler (1957–1997) in Lower Manhattan. Since then it has been supported by a prestigious Board of Advisors, currently composed of Jellybean Benitez, Michael Feinstein, Youssou N'Dour, Keith Richards, Nile Rodgers, Todd Rundgren, Fred Schneider, Martin Scorsese, Paul Simon and Mike Stoller. Past Board members include David Bowie (1947-2016), Jonathan Demme, John Hammond (1910–1987), Ellie Greenwich (1940–2009), Jerry Leiber (1933–2011), Lou Reed (1942–2013) and Jerry Wexler (1917–2008).

== Collection ==
The ARC focuses on commercially released popular music on record, created since the advent of microgroove recording in the mid-1940s. The collection contains two million sound recordings and over three million pieces of attendant support material including photographs, videos, DVDs, books, press kits, sheet music, ephemera and memorabilia.

The ARChive is spread across three locations in Tribeca, taking up a total of 15,000 square feet. George estimates that the archive has grown to three million vinyl records. The collection includes 750,000 dance singles, 350,000 seven inch singles, three million posters, press kits and photos, 25,000 music books, 60,000 videos, 100,000 music magazines and, although George doesn't collect the heavy, pre-vinyl 78s, the ARC has about 15000 of those, too.

The collection began with 47,000 sound recordings donated by Mr. George accumulated through his work as a DJ, producer and discographer. Mr. George is the co-author of Volume, The International Discography of the New Wave, and released Laurie Anderson’s first recording, O Superman, on his One Ten Records label.

Major collections deeded to ARC include The Jeep Holland Collection (100,000 recordings, 1987), The Rockpool Collection (30,000 recordings, 1991), The NBC Music Library Collection (10,000 recordings, 1991), the Robert Hall Library of Sound Effects (20,000 recordings, 1997), The ABC 45 rpm Record Collection (62,000 recordings, 1999), Jean Gallia Collection of French Popular Music (6000 recordings, 2004), Ron Saja / Footlight Records Collection (35,000 recordings, 2005), The Adam Goldstone Collection (10,000 recordings, 2007), The James Doran Piano Jazz Collection (2008), and the Jerry Rappaport Collection (6000 recordings, 2009).

The Keith Richards’ Blues Collection is the first specialty collection started by an ARChive Board member. Since 1991, Mr. Richards, a passionate devotee of early Blues music, has supported this collection, now numbering over 8,000 discs, including a rare Robert Johnson 78, "Me and The Devil Blues"/"Little Queen of Spades." (Vocalion, 04108, 78 rpm, 10-inch, 1937)

== Projects ==
While the primary function is preservation, ARC has provided research services and material to many projects - film, music, and academic.

Amongst the film and reissue projects ARC has contributed to are Ken Burns’ series Baseball (1994); Jonathan Demme's Philadelphia (1993), Beloved (1998) and The Manchurian Candidate (2004); Martin Scorsese’s The Last Temptation of Christ (1988) and Goodfellas (1990); and Ang Lee’s Taking Woodstock (2009).

Larger projects include providing metadata and images for Microsoft’s Music Central, the Nesuhi Ertegun Jazz Hall of Fame in Lincoln Center in New York and the Grammy Hall of Fame and Museum in Los Angeles. In 2009 ARC partnered with Columbia University to “assist future research and help further integrate the arts into the University's educational experience.”

Muslim World Music Day is collaborative project with the libraries and the Arts Initiative at Columbia University, Gracenote and the Internet Archive, which took place on April 12, 2011. They have continued their annual ‘'World Music Days”, online databases dedicated to highlighting a country, culture or genre of music. On September 7, 2012, the ARC celebrated Brazilian Music Day.

== See also ==
- List of record collectors
- List of music museums
