= Archives nationales =

Archives nationales may refer to:

- Centre Nationale des Archives (Algeria)
- National Archives of Benin
- National Archives of Cameroon
- Archives Nationales du Congo
- Archives Nationales (France)
- Musée des Archives Nationales
- National Archives of Haiti
- Centre des Archives Nationales (Lebanon)
- Direction Nationale des Archives du Mali
- National Archives of Mauritania
- Archives nationales d'outre-mer
- Bibliothèque et Archives nationales du Québec
- National Archives of Senegal
- National Archives of Tunisia
