= List of national archives =

National archives are central archives maintained by countries or nation states. This article contains a list of national archives. In some countries, national libraries serve the same purpose as national archives - or have archival departments.

Among their more important tasks is ensuring the accessibility and preservation of the information produced by governments, both analogically and digitally, for the government itself, researchers and the public.

Some national archives collections are large, holding millions of items spanning several centuries, while others have been created more recently and have modest collections. Many national archives are effectively dispersed, especially in post-colonial countries, and often have smaller local collections due to cultural imperialism and the theft of cultural and national documents and artifacts. There are ongoing international efforts to repatriate these materials to their communities of origin, in particular Indigenous cultural and intellectual property.

In the last decade, digitization projects have made possible to browse records and contents online.

== A ==
Country	Archive	Location	Year	Collection size	Notable artifacts	Image	Website
Afghanistan	National Archives of Afghanistan	Kabul	1890				
Albania	General Directorate of Archives	Tirana	1949		Codex Beratinus; Codex Beratinus II; Elbasan Gospel Manuscript		
Algeria	Centre Nationale des Archives	Birkhadem, Algiers					
American Samoa	American Samoa's Office of Archives and Records Management	Tutuila	1978				
Andorra	National Archives of Andorra	Andorra la Vella	1975				
Angola	Arquivo Histórico Nacional	Luanda					
Antigua and Barbuda	Antigua and Barbuda National Archives	St. John's, Antigua and Barbuda	1982				
Argentina	General Archive of the Nation	Buenos Aires	1821	800,000 photographs; 100,000 volumes; 3,000 films			
Armenia	National Archives of Armenia	Yerevan	1923				
Aruba	National Archives of Aruba	Oranjestad	1994				
Australia	National Archives of Australia	Canberra	1961	40,000,000 items	Griffin drawings; Mildenhall photographic collection		
Australia	National Film and Sound Archive	Canberra	1984	2,800,000 items			
Austria	Austrian State Archives	Vienna	1749				
Azerbaijan	National Archive Department of Azerbaijan	Baku	2002				

== B ==
Country	Archive	Location	Year	Collection size	Notable artifacts	Image	Website
Bahamas	National Archives of the Bahamas	Nassau	1971				
Bahrain	National Library of Bahrain at Isa Cultural Centre	Manama	2008				
Bangladesh	National Archives of Bangladesh	Dhaka	1973	225,000 volumes			
Barbados	National Archives of Barbados	Bridgetown					
Barbados	West Indies Federal Archives Centre	Cave Hill, Saint Michael, Barbados	2004				
Belarus	National Archives of Belarus	Minsk	1927				
Belgium	National Archives of Belgium	Brussels					
Belize	Belize Archives and Records Service	Belmopan					
Benin	National Archives of Benin	Porto-Novo	1914				
Bermuda	Bermuda National Library	Hamilton, Bermuda	1839				
Bhutan	National Library & Archives of Bhutan	Thimphu	1967				
Bolivia	National Archive and Library of Bolivia	Sucre	1836	114,000 volumes			
Bosnia and Herzegovina	Archives of Bosnia and Herzegovina	Sarajevo					
Botswana	National Archives of Botswana	Gaborone	1967	20,000 items			
Brazil	Arquivo Nacional	Rio de Janeiro	1838	1,740,000 photographs; 124,000 films; 44,000 maps; 20,000 illustrations; 4,000 videotapes			
British Virgin Islands	Archives and Records Management Unit, Governor's Office	Road Town					
Brunei	Brunei National Archives	Bandar Seri Begawan	1983				
Bulgaria	Bulgarian Archives State Agency	Sofia					
Burkina Faso	National Archives Centre	Ouagadougou					
Burundi	DMS Burundi	Bujumbura					

== C ==
Country	Archive	Location	Year	Collection size	Notable artifacts	Image	Website
Cambodia	National Archives of Cambodia	Phnom Penh					
Cameroon	National Archives of Cameroon	Yaoundé	1966	64,000 volumes			
Canada	Library and Archives Canada	Ottawa	2004	30,000,000 photographs; 20,000,000 books; 3,000,000 architectural drawings, plans and maps; 425,000 works of art; 550,000 music items; 90,000 films			
Cape Verde	Arquivo Histórico Nacional	Praia	1988				
Catalonia	National Archive of Catalonia	Sant Cugat del Vallès	1980				
Cayman Islands	Cayman Islands National Archive	George Town, Cayman Islands	1991				
Chad	Archives Nationales du Tchad						
Chile	National Archives of Chile	Santiago	1927				
China	National Archives Administration of China (a.k.a. the Central Archives)	Beijing	1954	80,000,000 items			
Colombia	General Archive of the Nation	Bogotá	1989				
Comoros	Comoros National Library	Moroni, Comoros	1979				
Republic of the Congo	Archives Nationales du Congo	Brazzaville					
Cook Islands	National Archives of the Cook Islands		1974	4,000 photographs			
Costa Rica	National Archives of Costa Rica	San José	1881				
Croatia	Croatian State Archives	Zagreb	1763				
Cuba	Archivo Nacional de la República de Cuba	Havana	1840				
Curacao	Nationaal Archief Curacao	Willemstad					
Cyprus	Cyprus State Archives	Nicosia	1972				
Czech Republic	National Archives	Prague			Golden Bull of Sicily; Zemské desky		

== D ==
Country	Archive	Location	Year	Collection size	Notable artifacts	Image	Website
Democratic Republic of the Congo	Institut National des Archives du Congo	Kinshasa	1989	3,000 volumes			
Denmark	Danish National Archives	Copenhagen	1889				
Djibouti	Archives Nationales et Bibliotheque de Djibouti	Balbala					
Dominica	Dominica Library & Information Service	Roseau	1843				
Dominican Republic	Archivo General de la Nación de República Dominicana	Santo Domingo	1935				

== E ==
Country	Archive	Location	Year	Collection size	Notable artifacts	Image	Website
East Timor	National Archives of East Timor	Dili	1999				
East Timor	Timorese Resistance Archive and Museum	Dili	2005				
Ecuador	National Archives of Ecuador	Quito	1884				
Egypt	Egyptian National Library and Archives	Cairo	1870				
El Salvador	National Library of El Salvador	San Salvador	2023				
England and Wales	The National Archives	Greater London	2003				
Eritrea	National Archives of Eritrea	Asmara					
Estonia	National Archives of Estonia	Tartu	1999				
Eswatini	Eswatini National Archives	Lobamba	1971				
Ethiopia	National Archives and Library of Ethiopia	Addis Ababa	1944				

== F ==
Country	Archive	Location	Year	Collection size	Notable artifacts	Image	Website
Falkland Islands	Jane Cameron National Archives	Stanley	1841				
Faroe Islands	National Archives of the Faroe Islands	Tórshavn	1932				
Fiji	National Archives of Fiji	Suva	1954				
Finland	National Archives of Finland	Helsinki	1816	726,000 maps; 334,000 volumes			
France	Archives Nationales	Paris and Pierrefitte-sur-Seine	1790				

== G ==
Country	Archive	Location	Year	Collection size	Notable artifacts	Image	Website
Gabon	National Archives of Gabon	Libreville	1969				
Gambia	The Gambia National Records Service	Banjul	1966		Audio recordings and oral histories in various Mande, Niger–Congo and Atlantic–Congo languages - including Mandinka, Fula, Wolof, Jola, Krio, Soninke, Manjak, Serer and Karoninka.; Pre-colonial and rare colonial texts containing documentation, data, social histories, women's histories and plant knowledge		
Georgia	National Archives of Georgia	Tbilisi	1920	274,625 photographs			
Germany	German Federal Archives	Koblenz	1952				
Ghana	National Archives of Ghana (until 1997)	Accra					
Ghana	Public Records and Archives Administration Department		1997				
Gibraltar	Gibraltar Archives	Gibraltar	1969				
Greece	General State Archives	Psychiko	1914				
Greenland	Greenland National Museum	Nuuk	1982		Ammassalik wooden maps; 15th-century mummies and clothing of the Thule / Greenlandic Inuit culture at the Qilakitsoq archaeological site; Pearyland Umiaq, the oldest intact skin boat in the world; Over 35,000 repatriated cultural objects, originally held in the collections of the National Museum of Denmark		
Grenada	Grenada National Museum	St. George's	1959		Grenada Plantation Records, 1737-1845		
Guam	Guam Museum	Hagåtña	1980				
Guatemala	Archivo General de Centro América	Guatemala City	1846	Documents dating from 1537 onwards - relating to government, commerce, colonialism, revolutions, religion and more			
Guatemala	Guatemala National Police Archives	Guatemala City	Discovered in 2005	80 million pages of documents from, dating from the late 19th-century through the Guatemalan Civil War	Largest recovered collection of state secrets in Latin America; Documents detailing kidnappings, torture, murders, and disappearances of the estimated 200,000 civilians who perished during the Guatemalan Civil War		
Guinea	National Archives of Guinea	Conakry					
Guinea-Bissau	Arquivos Históricos Nacionais da República da Guiné-Bissau	Bissau	1984				
Guyana	National Archives of Guyana (a.k.a. the Walter Rodney Archives)	Georgetown, Guyana	1958				

== H ==
Country	Archive	Location	Year	Collection size	Notable artifacts	Image	Website
Haiti	Archives Nationales d'Haïti	Port-au-Prince	1860				
Honduras	Archivo Nacional de Honduras	Tegucigalpa	1880				
Hong Kong	Government Records Service	Kwun Tong, Kowloon	1989				
Hungary	National Archives of Hungary	Budapest	1756				

== I ==
Country	Archive	Location	Year	Collection size	Notable artifacts	Image	Website
Iceland	National Archives of Iceland	Reykjavík	1882				
India	National Archives of India	New Delhi	1891				
Indonesia	National Archives of Indonesia	Jakarta	1819		Largest global archival collection related to the Dutch East India Company		
Iran	National Library and Archive of Iran	Tehran	1899	55,000 old books, including 28,158 manuscripts and more than 26,000 lithographs featuring old lead printing; An Iranian Studies collection that includes 80,410 books, 2,300 dissertations and 6000 journals; An Islam Studies collection with 8,203,238 books, magazines and tapes; The library has 14 halls with 15 million library items	Smallest known octagonal Quran (3 x 3.3 cm), قرآن هشت ضلعی		
Iraq	Iraq National Library and Archive	Baghdad	1920		One of the oldest copies of the Quran (which was destroyed during the 2003 invasion of Iraq by the United States)		
Ireland	National Archives of Ireland	Dublin	1867		Primary (Griffith) Valuation, 1847-1864 land and buildings value directory		
Isle of Man	Manx Museum	Douglas, Isle of Man	1922				
Israel	Israel State Archives	Jerusalem	1949	400 million documents, maps, stamps, audio tapes, video clips, photographs and special publications			
Israel	Central Zionist Archives	West Jerusalem	1919		Personal papers of Theodor Herzl, Nahum Sokolow, David Wolffsohn, Max Bodenheimer, Henrietta Szold, Eliezer Ben Yehuda, Haim Arlosoroff and other functionaries of the Zionist movement; Files of the General Council (Va'ad Leumi)		
Italy	Central Archives of the State	Rome	1875				
Ivory Coast	Archives Nationales du Côte d´Ivoire	Abidjan					

== J ==
Country	Archive	Location	Year	Collection size	Notable artifacts	Image	Website
Jamaica	Jamaica Archives and Records Department	Kingston, Jamaica	1955				
Japan	National Archives of Japan	Chiyoda, Tokyo	1959				
Jordan	National Library of Jordan	Amman	1977				

== K ==
Country	Archive	Location	Year	Collection size	Notable artifacts	Image	Website
Kazakhstan	National Archives of Kazakhstan	Astana	2002				
Kazakhstan	Central State Archive of the Republic of Kazakhstan	Almaty					
Kazakhstan	Republic of Kazakhstan Presidential Archive	Almaty					
Kenya	Kenya National Archives	Nairobi	1965	40,000 volumes			
Kiribati	Kiribati National Library and Archives	Bairiki					
Kosovo	National Library of Kosovo	Pristina	1944	382,806 books			
Kosovo	State Agency of Archives of Kosovo	Pristina	1977				
Kuwait	National Library of Kuwait	Kuwait City	1923	465,000 books			
Kyrgyzstan	National Library of the Kyrgyz Republic	Bishkek	1934				
Kyrgyzstan	Central State Archives of the Republic of Kyrgyzstan	Bishkek					

== L ==
Country	Archive	Location	Year	Collection size	Notable artifacts	Image	Website
Lebanon	Centre des Archives Nationales	Beirut					
Liberia	Center for National Documents and Records	Monrovia	1977				
Libya	National Archives of Libya	Tripoli, Libya					
Liechtenstein	Liechtenstein National Archives	Vaduz	1961				
Lithuania	Office of the Chief Archivist of Lithuania	Vilnius					
Luxembourg	Archives nationales de Luxembourg (ANLux)						

== M ==
Country	Archive	Location	Year	Collection size	Notable artifacts	Image	Website
Madagascar	National Archives of Madagascar			30,000 volumes			
Malawi	National Archives of Malawi						
Malaysia	National Archives of Malaysia	Kuala Lumpur	1957				
Mali	Direction Nationale des Archives du Mali	Bamako					
Malta	National Archives of Malta	Rabat, Malta					
Marshall Islands	Alele Museum & Public Library						
Mauritania	National Archives of Mauritania		1955	3,000 volumes			
Mauritius	National Archives of Mauritius	Coromandel, Mauritius	1815				
Mexico	Archivo General de la Nación	Mexico City					
Mongolia	National Archives of Mongolia	Ulaanbaatar	1927				
Montenegro	State Archives of Montenegro	Cetinje	1951				
Morocco	National Library of the Kingdom of Morocco	Rabat	1924				
Mozambique	Arquivo Histórico de Moçambique		1934				
Myanmar	National Archives of Myanmar	Naypyidaw	1973				

== N ==
Country	Archive	Location	Year	Collection size	Notable artifacts	Image	Website
Namibia	National Archives of Namibia	Windhoek	1939	6,000 maps; 40,000 photographs; 30,000 audiovisual items			
Netherlands	Nationaal Archief	The Hague	1802				
Nepal	National Archives	Kathmandu	1967				
New Zealand	Archives New Zealand	Wellington					
Nicaragua	General National Archive	Managua					
Niger	Archives nationales du Niger						
Nigeria	National Archives of Nigeria	Abuja					
Northern Ireland	Public Record Office of Northern Ireland	Belfast	1923		Bull of Pope Honorius III, dated 1219		
Norway	National Archives of Norway	Oslo	1817				

== P ==
Country	Archive	Location	Year	Collection size	Notable artifacts	Image	Website
Pakistan	National Archives of Pakistan	Islamabad		19,000 books			
Palestine	Palestine National Archives	Ramallah					
Palestine	Central Archives of Gaza City	Gaza City					
Palestine	Al-Budeiri Library	Old City of Jerusalem		900 manuscripts			
Palestine	Khalidi Library	Old City of Jerusalem	1900		One of Ottoman Palestine's first public libraries and historical document collections		
Panama	National Archives of Panama	Panama City	1912				
Paraguay	Archivo Nacional de Asunción						
Peru	General Archive of the Nation	Lima	1872				
Philippines	National Archives of the Philippines	Manila					
Poland	Central Archives of Historical Records	Warsaw	1808				
Poland	Archives of Modern Records	Warsaw	1919				
Poland	National Digital Archives	Warsaw	2008 (1955)	over 15,000,000 photographs; over 40,000 sound recordings; about 2,400 motion pictures			
Portugal	Torre do Tombo National Archive	Lisbon	1378				
Puerto Rico	Archivo General de Puerto Rico	San Juan, Puerto Rico	1955				

== R ==
Country	Archive	Location	Year	Collection size	Notable artifacts	Image	Website
Romania	National Archives of Romania	Bucharest		70,000 books			
Russia	Russian State Archive of Contemporary History	Moscow					
Russia	Russian State Archive of Socio-Political History	Moscow					
Russia	Russian State Archive of Literature and Art	Moscow	1941				
Russia	State Archive of the Russian Federation	Moscow	1992				
Rwanda	National Archives of Rwanda	Kigali					

== S ==
Country	Archive	Location	Year	Collection size	Notable artifacts	Image	Website
Sahrawi Arab Democratic Republic	Saharawi National Archive						
San Marino	State Archives of San Marino						
Scotland	National Records of Scotland (previously National Archives of Scotland)	Edinburgh					Website
Senegal	National Archives of Senegal	Dakar					
Serbia	State Archives of Serbia	Belgrade	1900				
Seychelles	Seychelles National Archives	Mahé, Seychelles	1964				
Singapore	National Archives of Singapore						
Slovakia	Slovak National Archives	Bratislava	1928				
Slovenia	Archives of the Republic of Slovenia	Ljubljana					
South Africa	National Archives and Records Service of South Africa	Arcadia, Pretoria					
South Korea	National Archives of Korea	Daejeon					
South Sudan	National Archives of South Sudan	Juba					
Spain	Archivos Estatales - State Archives	Madrid					
Spain	General Archive of the Indies	Seville		43,000 volumes; 80,000,000 pages			
Spain	Archivo General de Simancas	Simancas	1540	More than 78.000 units (bundles/boxes/books); 13,5 km of shelves			
Sri Lanka	Department of National Archives	Colombo					
Sudan	National Records Office of Sudan	Khartoum		13,000 volumes; 20,000,000 documents			
Suriname	National Archives of Suriname	Paramaribo					
Sweden	National Archives of Sweden	Stockholm	1618		Codex Argenteus		
Switzerland	Swiss Federal Archives	Bern	1798				
Switzerland	Swiss Literary Archives	Bern	1991				
Switzerland	Swiss Film Archive	Lausanne		85,000 films; 26,000 books; 3,000,000 photographs			
Switzerland	Swiss National Sound Archives	Lugano	1984				

== T ==
Country	Archive	Location	Year	Collection size	Notable artifacts	Image	Website
Taiwan	National Archives Administration, National Development Council	Linkou, New Taipei City	2014	31,098.61 meters of paper documents			
Tanzania	Tanzania National Archives	Dar es Salaam	1962				
Thailand	National Archives of Thailand	Bangkok		444,009 photographs; 808,693 films; 20,062 maps and plans			
Thailand	Thai Film Archive	Nakhon Pathom province					
Togo	National Archives of Togo	Lomé					
Trinidad and Tobago	National Archives of Trinidad and Tobago	Port of Spain					
Tunisia	National Archives of Tunisia	Tunis					
Turkey	Ottoman archives	Istanbul					

== U ==
Country	Archive	Location	Year	Collection size	Notable artifacts	Image	Website
Ukraine	State Archival Service of Ukraine						
United Arab Emirates	National Library and Archives	Abu Dhabi	1968				
United Kingdom	The National Archives (UK Government, and England and Wales only)	Greater London	2003				
United Kingdom	National Records of Scotland (previously National Archives of Scotland; Scotland only)	Edinburgh					Website
United Kingdom	Public Record Office of Northern Ireland (Northern Ireland only)	Belfast	1923		Bull of Pope Honorius III, dated 1219		
United States	National Archives and Records Administration	Washington, D.C.	1934				
Uruguay	General Archive of the Nation	Montevideo					

== V ==
Country	Archive	Location	Year	Collection size	Notable artifacts	Image	Website
Vanuatu	National Archives of Vanuatu						
Vatican City	Vatican Apostolic Archive	Cortile del Belvedere	1612				
Venezuela	National Archives of Venezuela	Caracas					

== Z ==
Country	Archive	Location	Year	Collection size	Notable artifacts	Image	Website
Zambia	National Archives of Zambia	Lusaka		70,000 volumes			
Zimbabwe	National Archives of Zimbabwe	Harare	1935				

== See also ==
- Archives by country
- List of archives
- List of archivists
- Lists of film archives
- List of national libraries
- National library
- List of oldest institutions in continuous operation
