= Archivo Nacional =

Archivo Nacional is Spanish for National Archive. It may refer to:

- Archivo Nacional de la Memoria
- Archivo Nacional de Chile
- Biblioteca y Archivo Nacional de Paraguay
- National Archives of Ecuador
- National Archives of Costa Rica
