= Culture of the Falkland Islands =

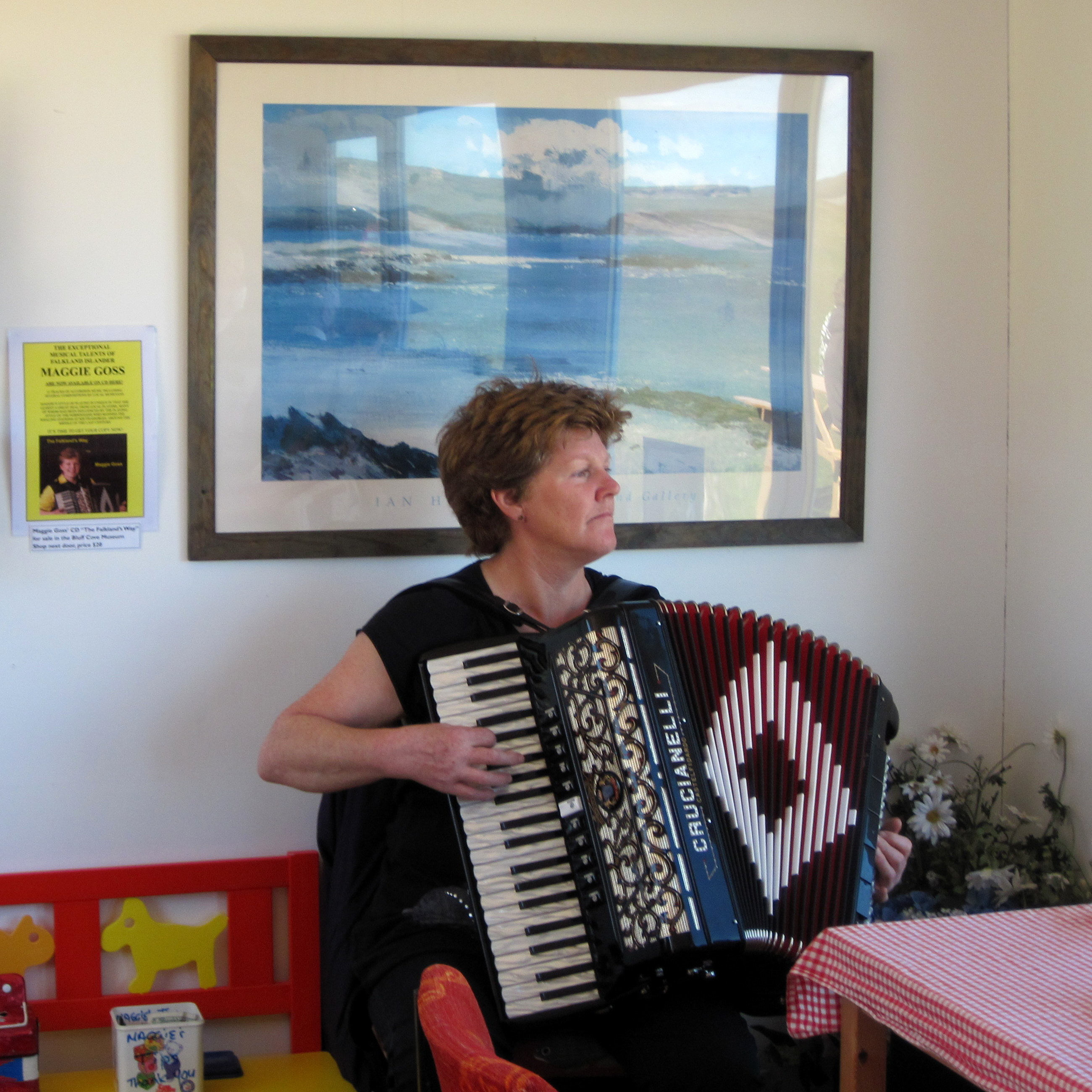
An accordion player in the Falkland Islands

The culture of the Falkland Islands is essentially analogous to that of British culture, along with some influences of Hispanic America. The Falkland Islands have a large native-born population, mainly white and from England (and also to a much lesser extent, other parts of the British Isles), but also from Saint Helena.

== Language ==
The English language is used, mainly in its British English form. However, due to the isolation of the islands, the small population retains its own accent/dialect. In rural areas (i.e. anywhere outside Port Stanley), known as "Camp" (from Spanish campo, "countryside"), the Falkland accent tends to be stronger. The dialect has resemblances to Australian, New Zealand, West Country and Norfolk dialects of English, as well as Lowland Scots. Other notable Falkland island terms are the words "kelper" meaning a person who lives in the Falklands, etymologically, the term comes from the kelp surrounding the islands (although this term is sometimes considered pejorative); and "smoko" referring to a smoking break.

The official language of the Falkland Islands is English, and other spoken languages are Lowland Scots, Spanish (mostly spoken by Chileans, with some Spaniards and Argentines), French, Tagalog, and historically Yaghan.

== Literature ==
Due to the low population of the islands, most of the literature of the islands has been written by outsiders, and is non-fiction. However some poetry has been written by Falklanders, including Ernest Spencer's Motherland.

== Architecture ==
The 1911 Britannica states:

The houses [of Stanley], mostly white with coloured roofs, are generally built of wood and iron, and have glazed porches, gay with fuchsias and pelargoniums. Government House, grey, stone-built and slated, calls to mind a manse in Shetland or Orkney. The government barrack is a rather imposing structure in the middle of the town, as is the cathedral church to the east, built of stone and buttressed with brick.

The government barrack is now a guesthouse and is somewhat more in keeping with the surrounding houses.

Since this date, many more buildings have been erected in Stanley. In 1998, the Government of the Falkland Islands started a programme to encourage building of private houses; the development is known as East Stanley as it developed Stanley to the east. This led to a boom in the housing construction market with many new timber kit houses imported, largely from Scotland. These range from single bedroom bungalows to large 4-5 bedroom houses, the style of cladding and colours varying immensely.

Falkland houses are renowned for being brightly painted with immaculately maintained gardens; older houses frequently have intricately carved wooden fascia boards.

The Bodie Creek Suspension Bridge is sometimes stated to be the most southerly in the world.

== Art ==
The following is a outline of Art of the Falkland Islands.

Art genres - Landscapes, Seascapes, Maritime, Ships, Boats, Work and the Working Environment, Domestic Life, Folkart, Illustrations, Wildlife, Flora and Fauna, Architecture, Buildings, Conflict, and People. Painting, Oils, Watercolours, print and photography.

Art of the Falklands could be broken down into three basic periods.

The early period, 1833 to 1914 was dominated by a few talented amuetur individuals, visitors to the islands and artists recording the exploration of the Falkland, Sub-Antarctica and Antarctic regions, cataloguing its fauna and flora.

From 1914 to 1986 was a period of slow development with few outlets such as postage stamps, book publications and illustrations, for local artists.

The conflicts of the Twentieth Century, and in particular, The Battle of the Falklands, The Battle of the River Plate and The Falklands War were well depicted by Naval artists of the day. The Falklands Conflict is covered by Cultural impact of the Falklands War and have been recorded by Official War Artists. These conflicts dominate this period.

Since 1986, economic diversification and a growth in population has led to an increase in Artistic activity in the Islands. The opening of Falkland Islands Museum and National Trust, the Jane Cameron National Archives have found homes for Falklands Art and Photography Collections. The commercial Studio 52 sells art in Stanley.

Pete Banksy is the name given by locals to an anonymous sculptor who in the 2020s has placed art around Stanley on road signs, next to junctions or on fences. The works include a person dancing, an owl and a snail. They are made of metal junk, such as hubcaps, bolts and bits of engines. The name "Pete Banksy" is a play on the anonymous British artist Banksy, and the peat banks that define the Falklands landscape.

Artists associated with the Falkland Islands

Edward Fanshawe Royal Naval officer and amateur painter, who produced some of the earliest representations of life and landscapes in Falklands on a tour of duty in May 1849 whilst in command of HMS Daphne (1838).

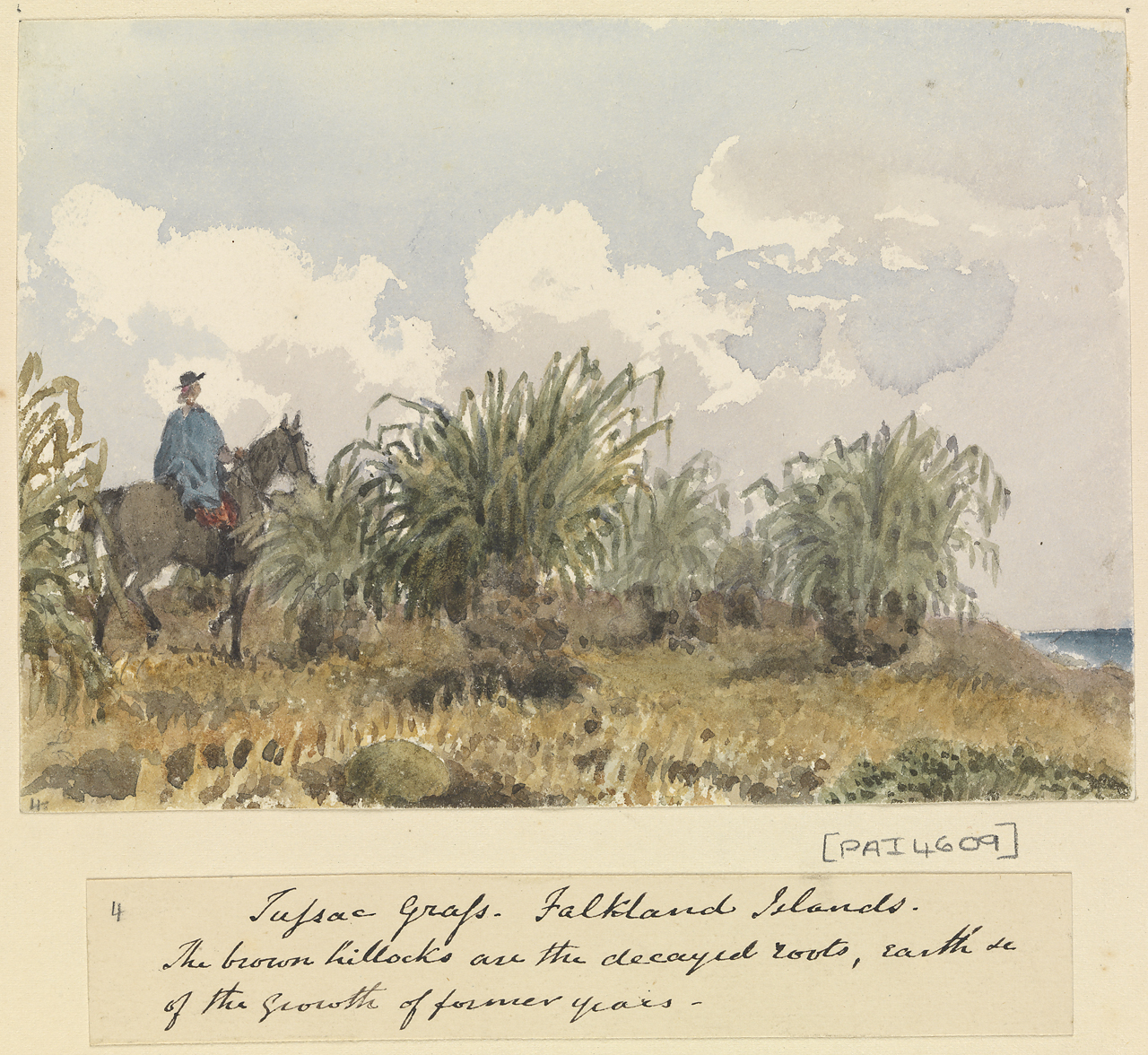
Edward Gennys Fanshawe, Tussac Grass, Falkland Islands

William Dale 1826 - 1870, Camp manager and artist painted the early life of the colony.

Dora Blake 1853 - 1923 Artist who illustrated domestic life in late Victorian life in the Camp. Her work was published in Falkland watercolours by Dora Blake by Sally Blake and Falklands Heritage: a record of Pioneer settlement by Mary Trehearne 1978.

Elinor Frances Vallentin 1873–1924, botanist and botanical illustrator co authored Illustrations of the flowering plants and ferns of the Falkland Island by Mrs E. F. Vallentin with descriptions by Mrs E. M. Cotton (London, L. Reeve & Co., 1921). An exhibition of her work was held at Stanley in May 1911.

== Miscellaneous ==
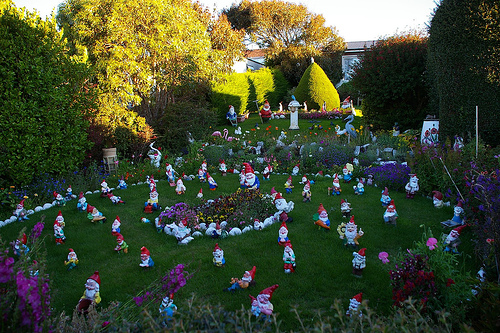
Gnomes in a Stanley garden, a peculiarly British taste

There is one major newspaper, the Penguin News, and also a radio station, the Falkland Islands Radio Service (FIRS). The islands also have their own national football team and national cricket team.

Cultural events are organised from time to time and involve many sectors of the population. A Fringe Festival was held in 2022 and featured monologues written by Alan Bennett, a Burlesque evening, music of various genres, poetry and other events. In 2023 Stanley held its first Festival of Lights, with dancers, floats, illuminations and music. The Falkland Islands Operatic and Dramatic Association produces plays and murder mystery evenings.
