= General National Archive =

General National Archive (Spanish: Archivo General de la Nación) is the name of several national archives in Latin America.

- General Archive of the Nation (Argentina)
- General Archive of the Nation (Colombia)
- General National Archive (Mexico)
- General National Archive (Nicaragua)
- General Archive of the Nation (Peru)
- General National Archive (Uruguay)
- General National Archive (Venezuela)
