= Sahrawi National Archives =

National archives of Western Sahara

- Alternative names: الأرشيف الوطني الصحراوي; Archivo Nacional Saharaui
- Location: Sahrawi Arab Democratic Republic
- Type: National archives
- Director: Larbi Ould Abeicher
- Collection size: 17,500 microfilms

The Sahrawi National Archives (Arabic: الأرشيف الوطني الصحراوي, Spanish: Archivo Nacional Saharaui) are the national archives of the Sahrawi people, housed at the seat of the administrative center of the Western Sahara government in exile in Rabouni.

The national archives started with materials from the Archivo de Ministerio de Información of Sahrawi Arab Democratic Republic and it reached 17,500 microfilms.

== See also ==
- List of national archives
- Sahrawi people
- Western Sahara
