= Institut National des Archives du Congo =

National archives in Kinshasa, the Democratic Republic of the Congo

- Interactive map of Institut National des Archives du Congo
- 4.3093682043445005°S 15.288801260440732°E
- Location: 42 Ave De La Justice, Kinshasa, RD Congo, Kinshasa, Congo
- Established: 1989

The Institut National des Archives du Congo (INACO) are the national archives of the Democratic Republic of the Congo. It is located in Kinshasa and it has a collection of 3,000 volumes.

The national archives in their current form were founded by the ordinance n° 89/027 of 26 January 1989 as the Archives Nationales du Zaïre (ARNAZA), later Archives Nationales de la République démocratique du Congo (ARNACO). The decree n° 15/022 of 9 December 2015 restructured the ARNACO to a new public institution, the INACO. In 2019, the Department of State of the United States financed a renovation project for the INACO.

== See also ==
- List of national archives
