= Liechtenstein National Archives =

National archives of Liechtenstein in Vaduz

- Liechtensteinisches Landesarchiv
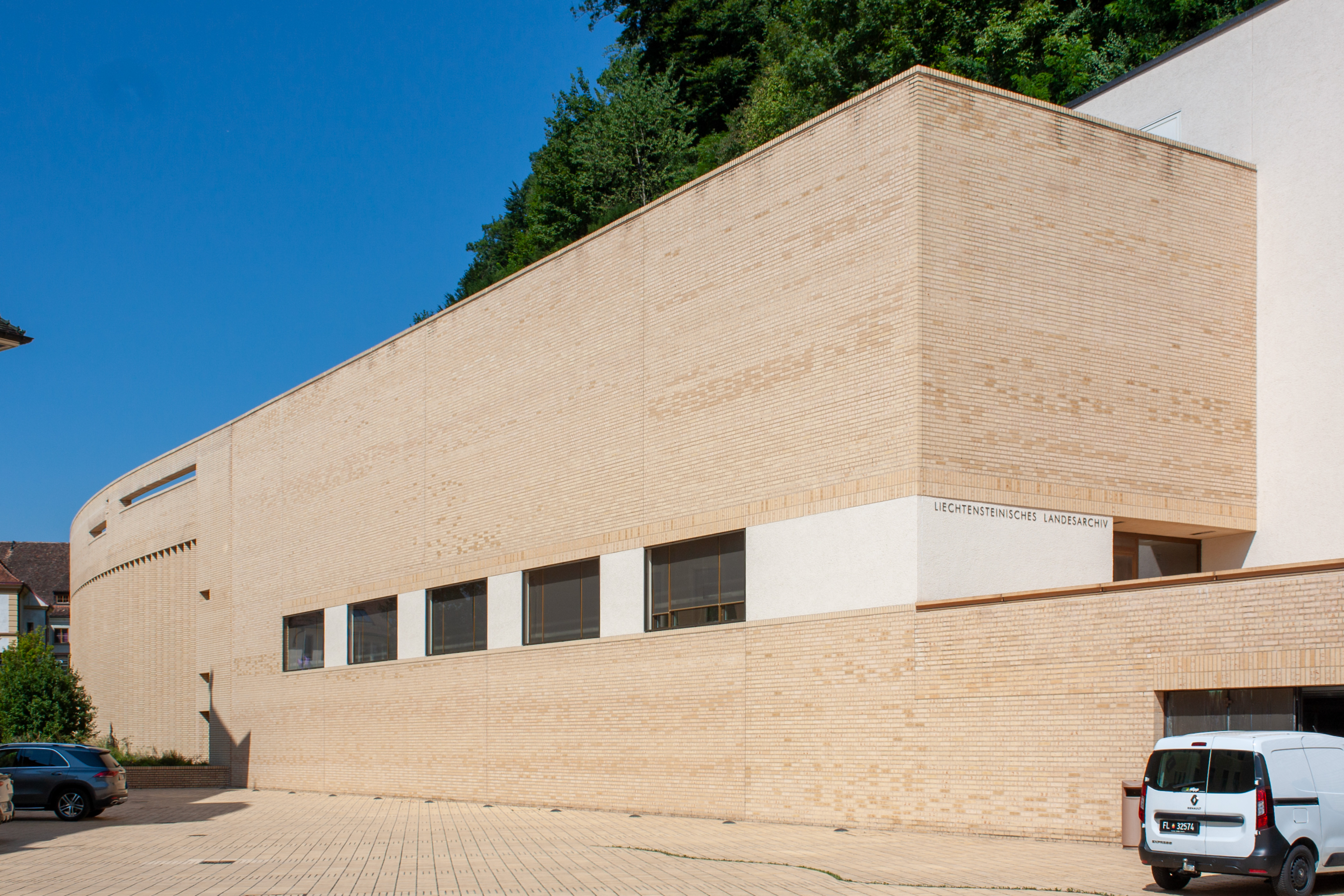

Agency overview
- Formed: 1961; 65 years ago
- Headquarters: Peter-Kaiser-Platz, 2 Postfach 684 9490, Vaduz, Liechtenstein; 47.13706°N 9.52278°E
- Parent department: Ministry of Culture
- Website: Official website

The Liechtenstein National Archives (German: Liechtensteinisches Landesarchiv) is the national archives of Liechtenstein. It functions to collect and conserve items significant to the history of Liechtenstein.

The archive was formed as its own office in 1961 and until 2001 was jointly managed alongside the Liechtenstein State Library. It primarily collects documents related to the government of Liechtenstein, but also takes documents, productions and other items significant to the history of Liechtenstein. The acquisition of non-governmental items is voluntary, primarily conducted through donations.

== See also ==
- History of Liechtenstein
- Liechtenstein State Library
- List of national archives
