= Brunei National Archives =

National archives of Brunei

Coordinates: 4.9149°N 114.9472°E

Brunei National Archives is the national archives of Brunei, located in Bandar Seri Begawan. It was founded in 1984 by the Brunei National Archives Act. The main function of the Department is to provide records and information management service to government agencies; and to collect, preserve and access the nation’s documentary heritage.

== See also ==
- List of national archives
