= State Archives of San Marino =

The State Archives of San Marino (Italian: Archivio di Stato della Repubblica di San Marino) are the national archives of San Marino.

== See also ==
- List of national archives
