= National Archives of Eritrea =

- Interactive map of National Archives of Eritrea
- 15.333572633943467°N 38.92760834934557°E
- Location: Asmara, Eritrea
- Website: http://www.eritreanarchives.org

The National Archives of Eritrea are the national archives of Eritrea. They are located in Asmara.

== See also ==
- List of national archives
