= General Authority for Archives of Mongolia =

National archives of Mongolia

Coordinates: 47°50′28.356″N 106°47′23.183″E

The General Authority for Archives of Mongolia are the national archives of Mongolia. It is based in Ulaanbaatar, and was established in 1927.

== See also ==
- List of national archives
