= Seychelles National Archives =

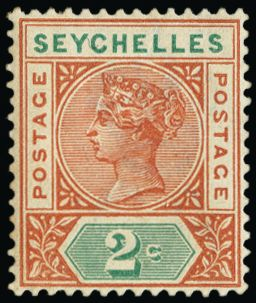
An 1897 stamp of Seychelles of the type held in the Archives.

The Seychelles National Archives is the national archive of Seychelles and is located in Mahé.

== History ==
SNA was officially created in 1964 to "collect, preserve and make accessible archival documents of enduring value through the use of the latest information technology."

The archives were originally kept in the same building as the National Library of Seychelles, but after a fungus outbreak in 2012 the archive's location was moved to a different building the following year.

In 2018, the Archives moved out of the National Cultural Centre. The new location is in the Helena Complex in Port Island, with all legal documents housed in the Seychelles Magistrates' Court in Victoria, and data entry is in the Providence Atoll.

== See also ==
- List of national archives
