= AGN =

AGN may refer to:

- Active galactic nucleus
- Acute glomerulonephritis
- African Group of Negotiators, a coalition of African States in conferences of the UNFCCC
- Agutaynen language
- Allergan (stock symbol AGN)
- Archivo General de la Nación (disambiguation) (General National Archive)
- Angoon Seaplane Base in Angoon, Alaska, US (IATA airport code AGN)
