= National Archives of Solomon Islands =

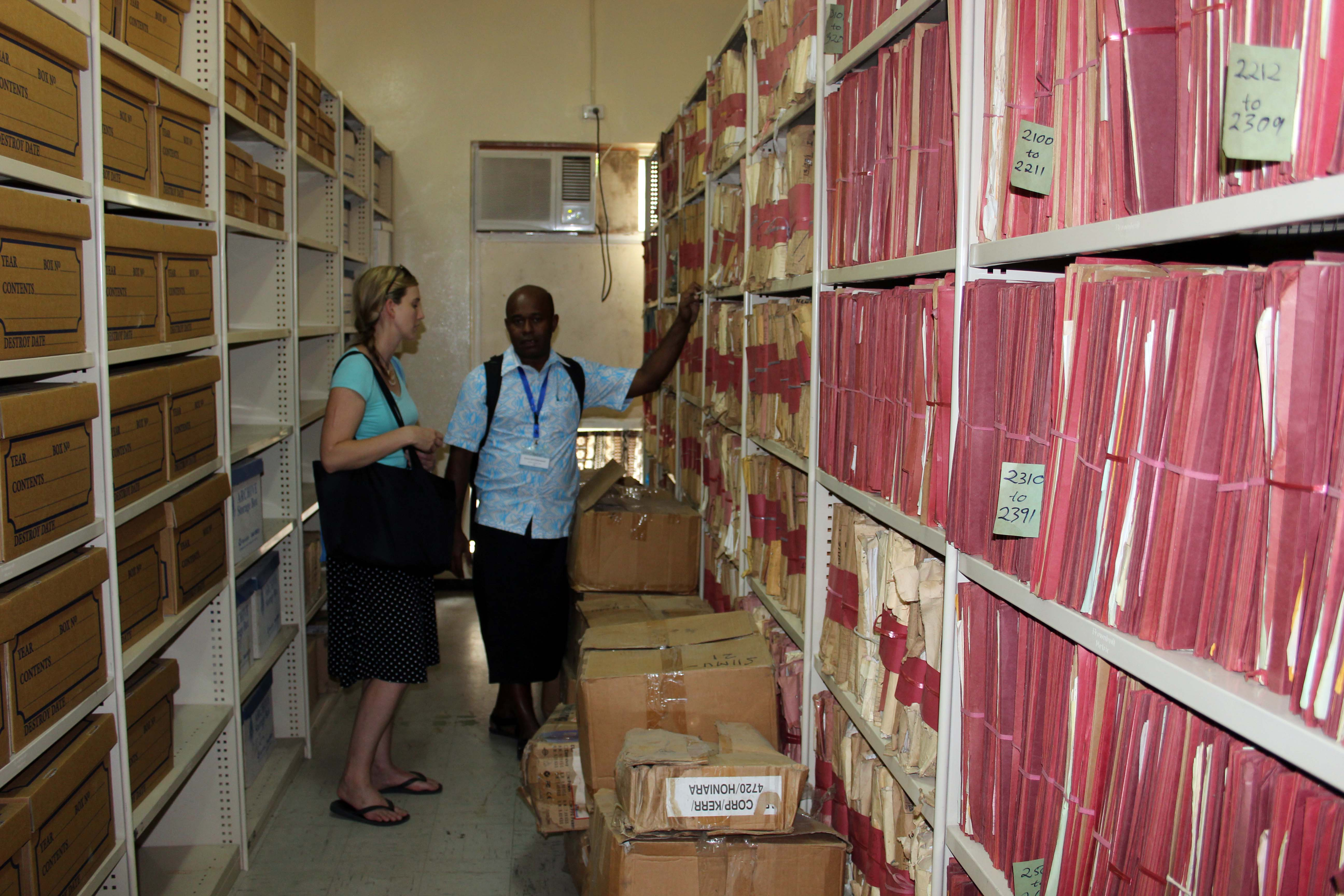
- Inside the National Archives of Solomon Islands in August 2013
- Interactive map of the National Archives of Solomon Islands area

General information
- Location: Honiara, Solomon Islands
- Coordinates: 9°25′56.834″S 159°57′14.526″E

Website
- Official Website

The National Archives of Solomon Islands are located in Honiara. One of the functions of the National Archives of the Solomon Islands is to provide and maintain an access and reference service whereby the Government and the general public may have access to the archival materials held in its custody. This resource has information on the access policy of the National Archives of the Solomon Islands.

== See also ==
- List of national archives
