= National Archives of Panama =

- Archivo Nacional de Panamá
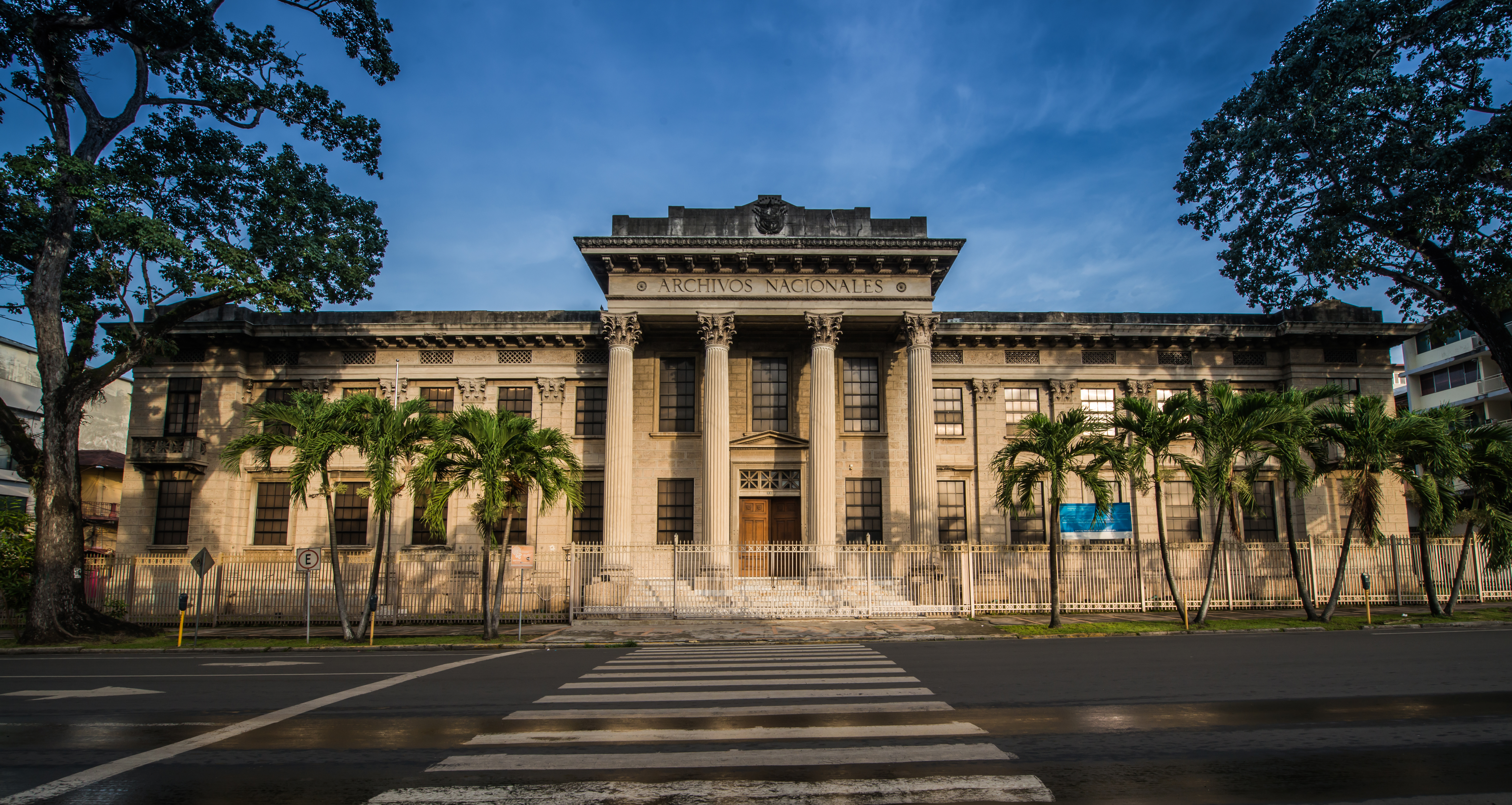
- Main building of the National Archives of Panama in Panama City.

National archives overview
- Formed: December 14, 1912; 113 years ago
- Headquarters: National Archives Building, Avenida Perú, Panama City; 8.96878°N 79.53790°W
- National archives executive: Jeaninne Williams Gallardo, Directora
- Parent department: Public Record of Panama
- Website: www.archivonacional.gob.pa

The National Archives of Panama (Spanish: Archivo Nacional de Panamá) is the institution in charge of safeguarding national documents. It was created by Law No. 43 of December 14, 1912, under the administration of President Belisario Porras, being Panama the first republic in America to have a building dedicated to its national archive.

Since its creation, it has had the mandate to protect the documentary material of patrimonial value and record of the historical memory of the country, in addition to the preservation of the historical-cultural heritage for current and future generations.

== History ==
The National Archives of Panama was created as an institution thanks to the enactment of Law No. 43 of December 14, 1912 under the administration of President Belisario Porras Barahona and has as a precedent the creation in 1885 of the position "Public Archivist of Panama City" (Spanish: Archivero Público de la Ciudad de Panamá) during the time of Union to Colombia.

After the Separation of Panama from Colombia and after returning from a hearing by the London Public Registry, the Royal Archives in Brussels and the Manuscripts Division of the Library of Congress in Washington among others, Dr. Porras was surprised at the dedication provided to the public records in the previous countries he set out to found a National Archive, Panama being the first country in America to build a building for that purpose.

Since its inception, it was conceived as a dependency of the Secretariat of Government and Justice, in 1941 it was renamed "National Archives" to the current name "National Archive of Panama." In 1964 it passed into the hands of the Ministry of Education; and then in 1982 it was assigned as a dependency of the National Institute of Culture. Finally, in 1999 the National Archive was transferred as a Directorate attached to the Public Record of Panama.

== See also ==
- List of national archives
