= National Archives of Togo =

- Interactive map of National Archives of Togo
- 6.129363583206583°N 1.2187602897203549°E
- Alternative name: Archives Nationales du Togo
- Location: Lome, Togo
- Type: National archives

The National Archives of Togo are located in Lomé, Togo. As of 2009 Maboulah Wenmi-Agore Coulibaley served as director of the Bibliothèque et des Archives Nationales du Togo.

== See also ==
- National Library of Togo
- List of national archives

== Bibliography ==
- Republique Togolaise: Réorganisation et développement des archives (PDF), Rapport technique (in French), Paris: Unesco, 1979
