= National Archives of Barbados =

Coordinates: 13.136552°N 59.634241°W

Barbados National Archives are the national archives of Barbados. It is located in the northern Black Rock, St. Michael close to the University of the West Indies campus adjacent to the Usain Bolt Sports Complex. The collection includes manuscripts, letters, reports, books, maps, charts and photographs.

From 1962 to 2004, the Barbados National Archives also held the West Indies Federation Federal Archives.

== See also ==
- List of archives in Barbados
- List of national archives
