= National Archives of Cameroon =

The National Archives of Cameroon (French: Archives nationales du Cameroun) is the national archives of Cameroon, established in 1966. Its main location is in Yaoundé and has a library which holds 64,000 volumes. There is an annex in Buea with early material. Maintenance of the National Archives falls within the responsibilities of the Ministry of Arts and Culture. The archive closed in 2016 for what promises to be a long running reorganization and digitization of its files. Researchers can still request access by writing to the director with a list of specific documents they wish to access. It is also possible to order digital photos of documents for a fee.

== Directors ==
- Claude Burgaud, 1952-1957
- Raymond Bonnefils, 1957-1958
- Louis Buttin, 1958-1960
- Henri Djeengue Ndoumbe, 1960-1961
- Alfred-Eugene Madjire Pfouma, 1961-1964
- Marc Etende, 1964-1972
- Mathias Sack, circa 1972
- Dr. Esther Olembe, 2016–present

== See also ==
- National Library of Cameroon
- List of national archives

== Bibliography ==
- Eldridge Mohammadou [in French] (1972). Le service des archives nationales de Yaounde (in French and German). Societe camerounaise d'histoire. OCLC 221244610.
- V. Schaefer (1973), Republique Unie du Cameroun: Organisation des Archives nationales et d'un système de prearchivage (PDF) (in French), Unesco
- Kenneth J. Orosz (1996). "Colonial archives in Cameroon". African Research and Documentation (71). UK. OCLC 230704799.
- Sali Babani (2008). "L'État et les archives au Cameroun: le cas des Archives nationales de Yaoundé, 1952-2002: aperçu historique et état des lieux". Journal of Environment and Culture (in French). 5. University of Ibadan. ISSN 1597-2755.
