= Eswatini National Archives =

National archives of Eswatini

The Eswatini National Archives are a Department of the Ministry of Information, Communications & technology. Director is Mr. Nqoba Msibi. The Archives are located in the Lobamba area of Eswatini (formerly Swaziland), along the Mbabane-Manzini road, next to the Houses of Parliament and opposite the Somhlolo National Stadium. They are open Monday to Friday and are closed weekends and public holidays.

== See also ==
- List of national archives
