= National Library of Benin =

Coordinates: 6.5118°N 2.6061°E

- Bibliothèque nationale du Bénin
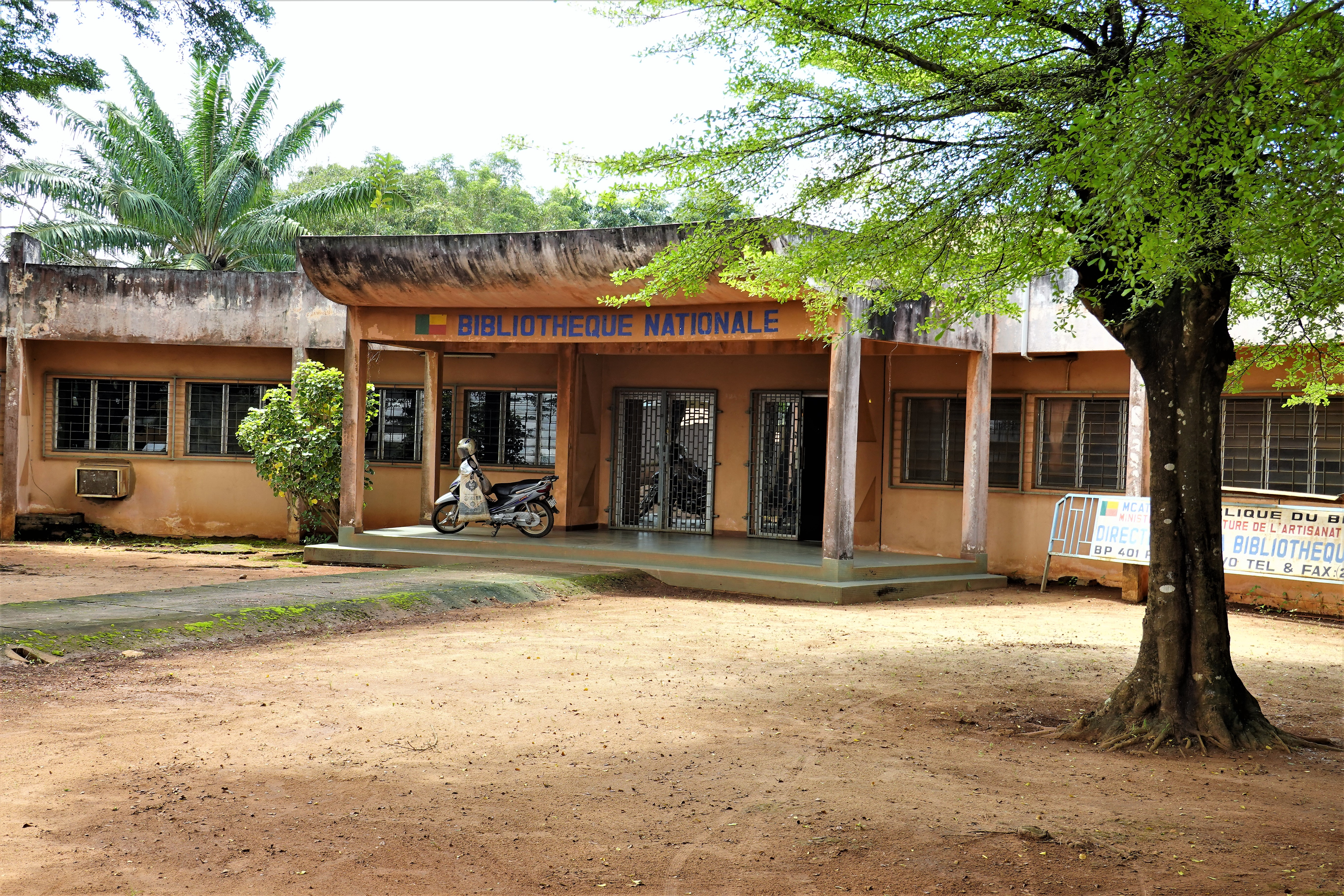
- Location: Benin
- Established: 1975

The National Library of Benin (French: Bibliothèque nationale du Bénin) is the legal deposit library for Benin. Originally chartered in November 1975 and located in Ouidah, the library moved to a purpose built unit in the Ouando neighbourhood of Porto-Novo during the 1980s.

== History ==
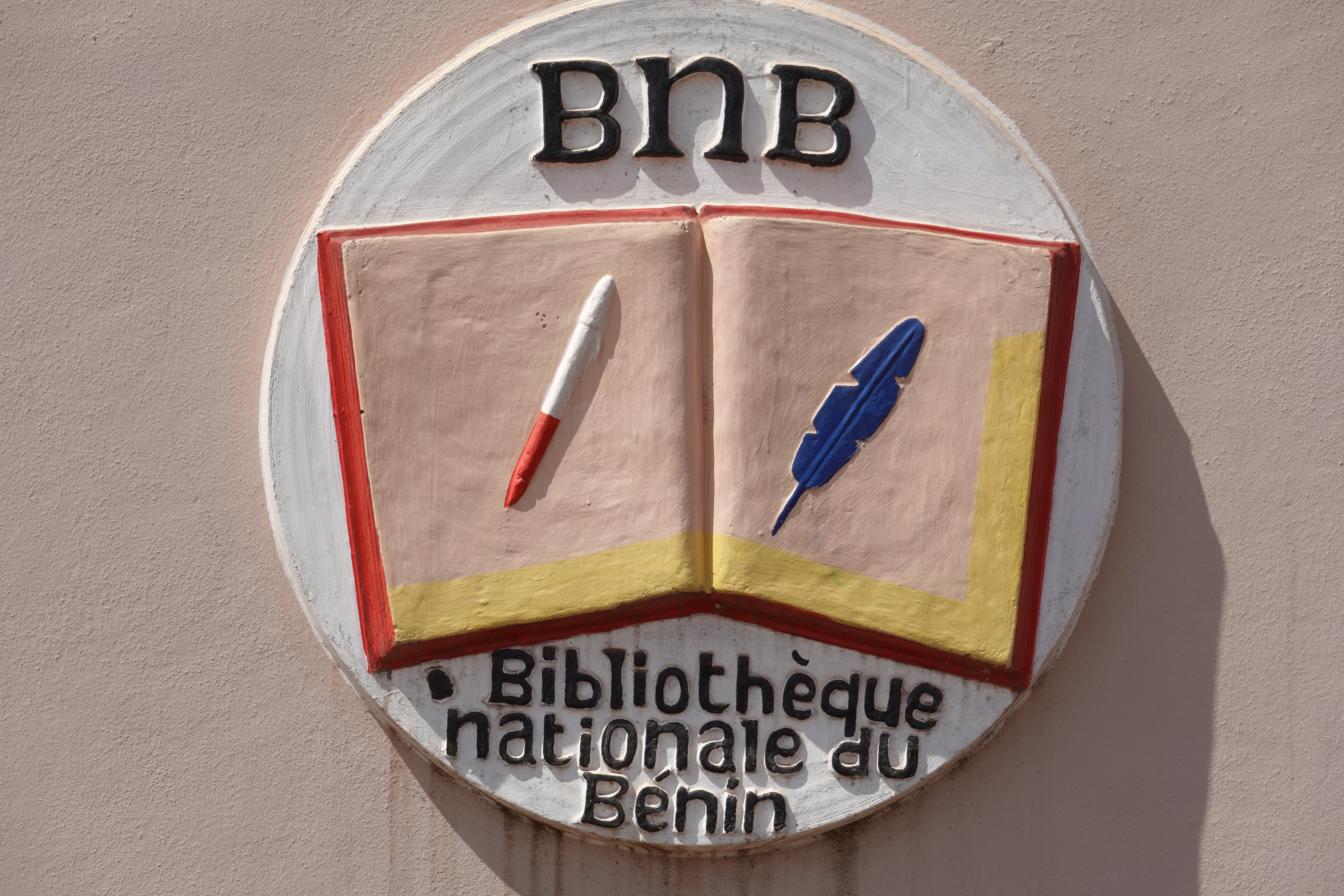
Benin National Library emblem

Originally located in Ouidah, The National Library of Benin was established on 25 November 1975 following the approval of the decree n°75-305. The first director of the library was Noël Hontongnon Amoussou. A 1976 Unesco report on the early stages of development of the library underlined the limited budget, the lack of personnel training, and the lack of global planning. A new building was created during the 1980s in Porto-Novo, which was opened to the public in 1987. For many years the director of the National Library was Florence Ayivi Foliaon.

By 2014, the library did not have a fire emergency system in place, no internet network, and the place had not been visited by the country's Minister of culture for 20 years.

== Description ==
The purpose of the National library of Benin is to collect, organize, preserve, and make accessible the documentary patrimony of the country. The library is composed of three units. Since opening, it holds a collection of 10,000 ancient documents on Dahomey and Africa in general. 4 copies of all books produced in the country must be deposited at the National Library (3 for books printed less than 300 times). The French Institute in Benin donates 3-year-old magazines and newspapers to the library.

== See also ==
- National Archives of Benin

== Bibliography ==
- Marcel Lajeunesse, ed. (2008). "Bénin". Les Bibliothèques nationales de la francophonie (PDF) (in French) (3rd ed.). Bibliothèque et Archives nationales du Québec. OCLC 401164333.
