= National Library of Tunisia =

Coordinates: 36.8°N 10.164°E

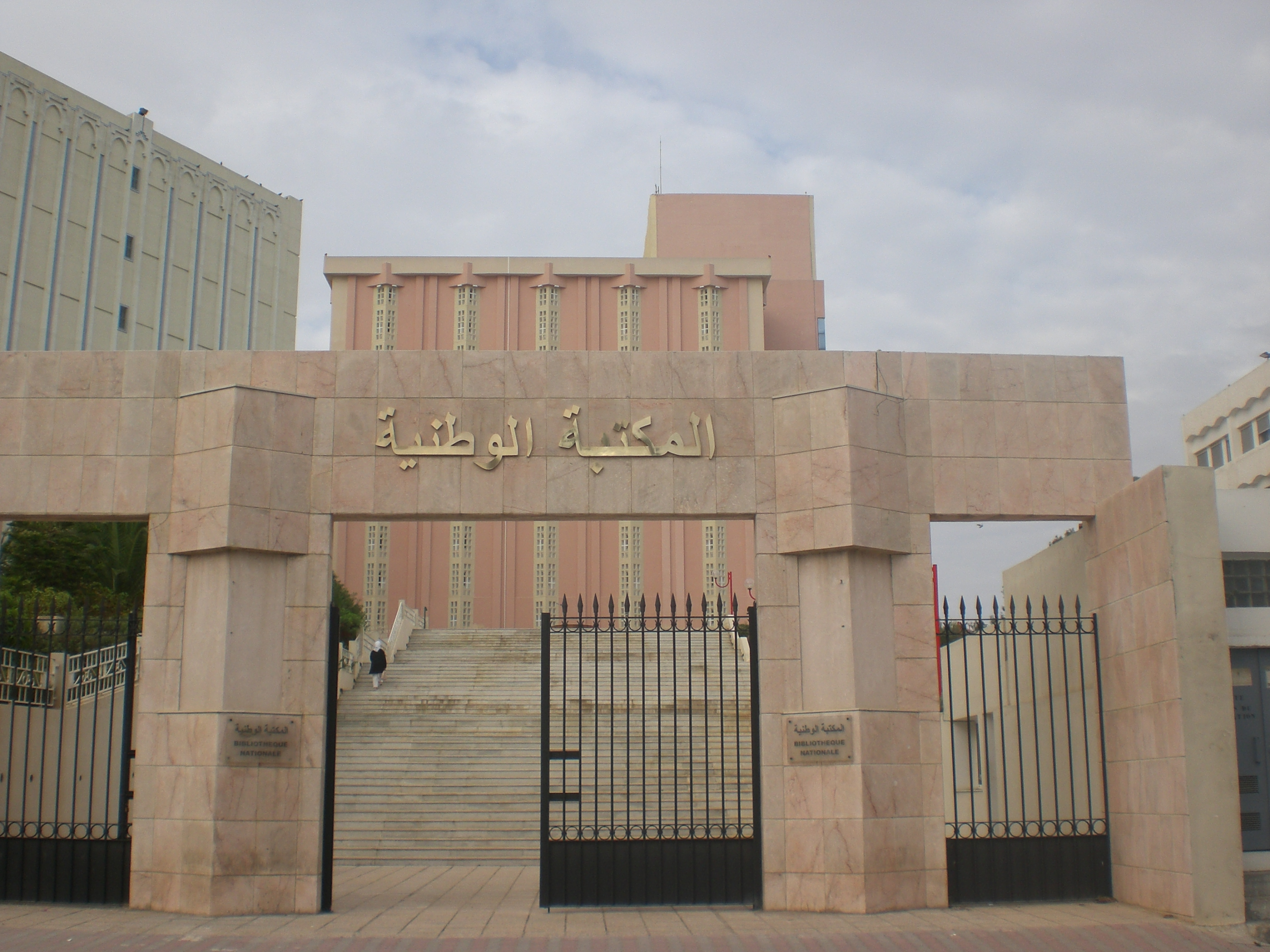
- Entry of the National Library of Tunisia

Institute overview
- Formed: 1885
- Jurisdiction: Tunisian Government
- Headquarters: Tunis, Tunisia
- Website: www.bnt.nat.tn

The National Library of Tunisia (BNT; Arabic: المكتبة الوطنية التونسية) is the legal deposit and copyright library for Tunisia. It was founded in 1885, then known as the French Library, and then the People's library. The Tunisian government assigned a budget of 28 million Dinars for a new building for the library, and in 2005 the library was relocated. The library is 46m tall and it is composed of 14 floors it is one of the tallest buildings in Tunisia and one of the most famous Islamic style building in Tunisia

== History ==
Founded in 1885, this library was called French Library. Its present name dates from the beginning of independence of Tunisia. In 2005, it was relocated to its present location, Boulevard 9 avril, just near the National Archives of Tunisia and some higher institutions like the Faculty of Social and Human Sciences.

== Bibliography ==
- Marcel Lajeunesse, ed. (2008). "Tunisie". Les Bibliothèques nationales de la francophonie (PDF) (in French) (3rd ed.). Bibliothèque et Archives nationales du Québec. OCLC 401164333.
- "Tunisia", World Report 2010, The Hague: International Federation of Library Associations, OCLC 225182140, archived from the original on 2019-06-29, "Freedom of access to information". (Includes information about the national library)
