= General National Archive (Nicaragua) =

National archives of Nicaragua

The General National Archive (Spanish: Archivo General de la Nación) is charged with conserving the documentary heritage of Nicaragua, standardizing the national archival system, and promoting research and access to information.

== History ==
A presidential decree on February 21, 1863, regulated the functions of the General Governmental Archive (Spanish: Archivo General del Gobierno), which was to be composed of the documents of the nascent institutions and supervised by the Minister of Finance. But it was not until July 7, 1896, that President José Santos Zelaya decreed the creation of the General National Archive as the repository for the holdings of the executive, judicial, and legislative branches of government, as well as holding the archives of the municipalities.

The earthquake of March 31, 1931 provoked a fire that destroyed the majority of the archives, including the Sección de Tierras, which included documents from the colonial era.

In October 1959, another decree was issued to regulate the operations of the archive. Until 1979, it was under the auspices of the Ministry of Governance, at which point in came under the control of the Ministry of Culture. With the administrative reforms of 1988, the archive came under the General Administration of Culture of the Ministry of Education. It was later ascribed to the Nicaraguan Historical Institute and since 1990 has been run by the Nicaraguan Institute of Culture.

== Functions ==
The functions of the General National Archive include:

- The collection, caretaking, and placing into public service the documents produced by public institutions,
- Caring for and conserving legal and private collections,
- and the dissemination, through printed publications and other media, of documents of historical interest.

== Holdings ==
The archive holds approximately ten million documents, which are organized in the following collections:

- Colonial Section (1526-1821): A collection of photocopies obtained from the National Archives of Costa Rica, chronologically ordered.
- Presidential Collection (1900-1979): Administrative archives, divided into sections for the Private Secretary, Presidential Secretary, Secretary of General Command, and Secretary of Information and the Press.
- Governance Collection (1925-1979): Archives of the Ministry of Governance and its attached bodies such as Justice, Police, and Charity.
- Education Collection (1900-1984): The most complete collection in regards to volume, documentary structure, and years covered. This collection is not completely processed, but are mostly in chronological order.
- Finance Collection (1931-1954): The ledgers of the Ministry of Finance. Consists of 731 books grouped by issued and ordered chronologically.
- Nicaraguan Railroad Collection (1912-1987): Accounting books and inventories of goods and services. A nearly-complete collection of the now-defunct Nicaraguan Railroad Company.
- Legislative Section (1943-1979): In numeric order, indexed.
- "Somoza García" Section (1923-1956): Documents related to the governmental activity of Anastasio Somoza García. Classified by provenance, chronologically ordered.
- "José Dolores Gámez" Collection (1783-1923): Bulk 1894–1899. Includes a registry and maintained in numeric order.
- Mosquitia Collection (1894-1895): Hand-written books relating to the process of the incorporation of Mosquitia.
- "Sandino" Collection (1896-1935): Contains 133 documents relating to General Augusto César Sandino, including 275 photocopies from the General National Archive of Mexico.
- Archive of the Nicaraguan Consulate in France (1898-1937): Registers of consulary affairs.
- "Adolfo Díaz" Archive (1909-1976): Contains 3,800 documents relating to the private and business life of former president Díaz.
- Fototeca (1893-1976): 1,200 photographs of people, places, buildings, highways, etc. from various presidential administrations.
- Mapoteca (1934-1976): Composed of 98 original maps of Nicaraguan populations.
- Planoteca (1912-1978): The utmost representation of the urban and rural populations in Nicaragua.
- Special Collections: Divided into four sections: History of Nicaragua, National Periodical Publications, Archival, and Documentary Sources. Includes approximately 1,500 volumes.

== Services ==
The Archive offers such services as a reading room, an auxiliary consultative library, and photocopying.

== Location ==
The General National Archive is housed on the second floor of the National Museum of Nicaragua, which is located in the old Palacio Nacional, across from the new Palacio Nacional in Managua.

== See also ==
- List of national archives
