= National Library of Rwanda =

National library, since 2012 located in Kigali Public Library (KPL) building

National Library of Rwanda Inkoranyabitabo
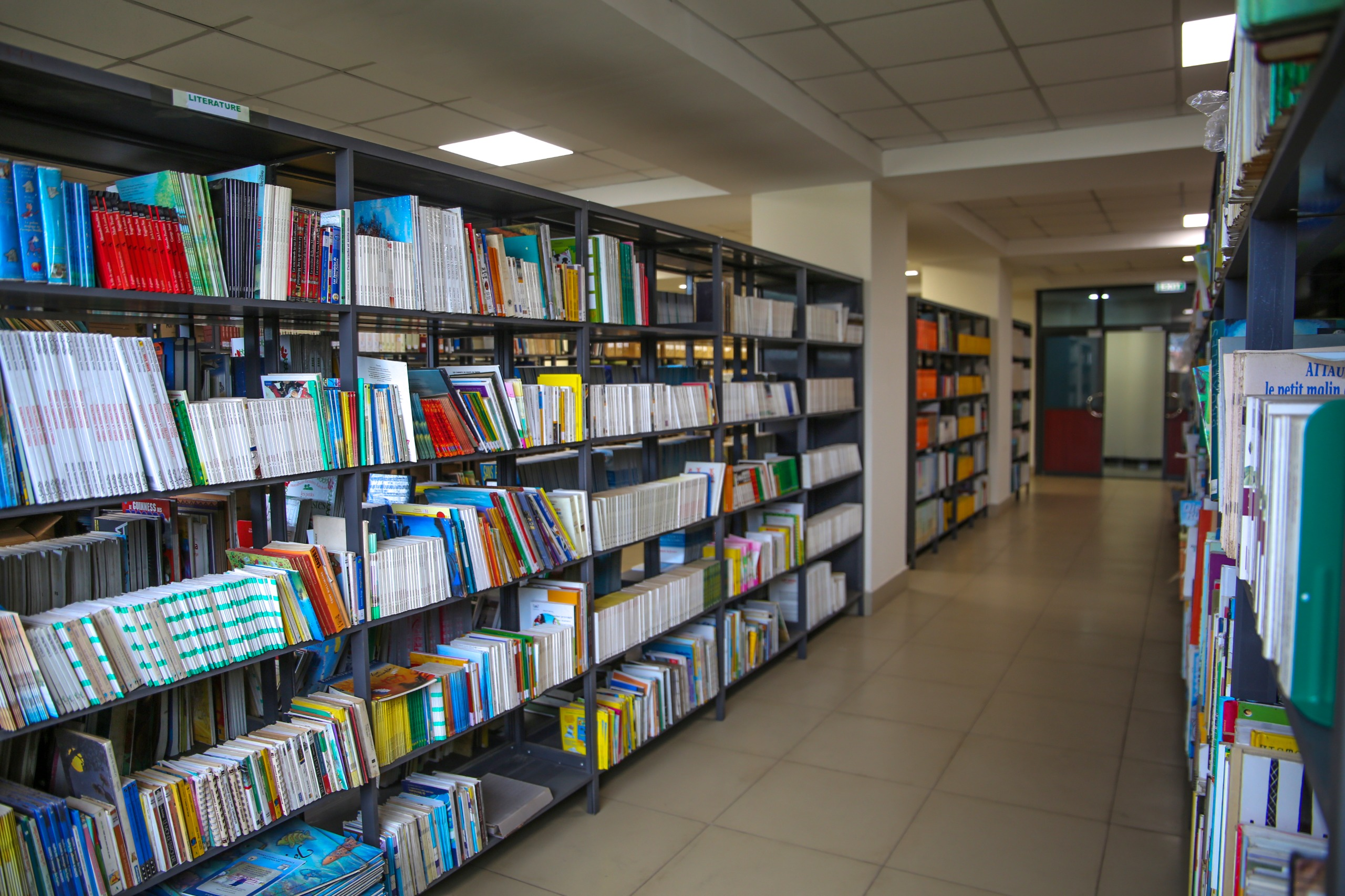
- Location: Kigali, Rwanda
- Established: 1989

The National Library of Rwanda known as "Inkoranyabitabo y'Igihugu" in Kinyarwanda, was founded in 1989 by the presidential order no 132/06 of March the 10th 1989 as a direction in Ministry of High Education and Research. It is located in the city of Kigali. It has a printed and digital collections. The Rwanda Archives and Library Services Authority was established by the Law No 12/2014 of 09/05/2014.

== See also ==
- National Archives of Rwanda
- List of national libraries

== Bibliography ==
- Marcel Lajeunesse, ed. (2008). "Rwanda". Les Bibliothèques nationales de la francophonie (PDF) (in French) (3rd ed.). Bibliothèque et Archives nationales du Québec. OCLC 401164333.
