= Belize Archives and Records Service =

Coordinates: 17.252148°N 88.768681°W

The Belize Archives and Records Service (BARS), originally named the National Archives of Belize and later the Belize Archives Department, is located in the capital city, Belmopan. According to the BARS Act, 2004, its mission is to "acquire, preserve and provide information of our national heritage." It houses both public records, dating back to around the 1770s, and several private collections of documents and photographs.

== History ==
The National Archives was established by the Government of Belize as a unit of the Public Library Service of Belize on August 5, 1965, the year after the country's independence. Leo H. Bradley, Sr., head of the Library Service at the time, was appointed Honorary Archivist.

In 1975, it was split off from the Library Service and established as a unit in its own right. At that time, it was run by a British archivist, assisted by a staff of three.

In 1980, it moved to its current location at 26/28 Unity Boulevard in Belmopan.

Charles Gibson, the first Belizean chief archivist of the Belize Archives Department, was appointed in 1982. Herman Byrd was named director of BARS in 2008 and was still serving in that post as of 2018.

In 1995, an information technology unit was set up to help automate the archives.

== Organization ==
The director is the head of BARS. As of 2018, there was an administrative unit to provide support for five technical units:

- user services
- preservation
- records management
- information technology
- audiovisual

Each of these five units is led by a head or supervisor who reports to the deputy director.

== See also ==
- List of national archives
