= National Archives of Cambodia =

Coordinates: 11.5769°N 104.9195°E

National Archives of Cambodia

The National Archives of Cambodia (Khmer: បណ្ណសារដ្ឋានជាតិនៃកម្ពុជា, romanized: bannasarodthan cheate nei kampouchea) are located in Phnom Penh. The collections include newspapers, magazines, photographs, posters, maps and drawings.

== See also ==
- List of national archives
