= List of museums in Barbados =

This is a list of museums in Barbados.

== Museums in Barbados ==
- Arlington House Museum
- Barbados Museum & Historical Society
- Cricket Legends of Barbados
- Exchange Museum
- George Washington House
- Nidhe Israel Synagogue
- Museum of Parliament & National Heroes Gallery (closed as of August 2026)
- Sir Frank Hutson Sugar Museum
- Springvale Eco-Heritage Museum (closed as of August 2026, per Google Maps)

== See also ==
- List of museums
- List of archives in Barbados
