= List of archives in Barbados =

This is list of archives in Barbados.

== Archives in Barbados ==
- Barbados National Archives
- West Indies Federal Archives Centre

== See also ==
- List of archives
- List of libraries in Barbados
- List of museums in Barbados
- Culture of Barbados
