= Center for National Documents and Records Agency =

The Old Executive Mansion in Monrovia which has housed the CNDRA since the 1990s

The Center for National Documents and Records Agency (CNDRA) is the national archives of Liberia.

== History ==
The CNDRA was founded in 1977. It was headquartered in a purpose-built building on Tubman Boulevard in the Sinkor area of Monrovia until 1992.

During the First Battle of Monrovia in the First Liberian Civil War in 1990, the archives were looted and many of the documents were destroyed or damaged. Some were salvaged and relocated to the nearby Old Executive Mansion on Ashmun Street. In 2004, it was reported that the CNDRA's staff were "making a valiant effort to preserve the salvaged materials" but were "nearly overwhelmed by the mass of materials and lack of current training, preservation materials, and funding".

A 2006 fire at the Executive Mansion resulted in the loss of some presidential records which, at the time, were stored on site as part of the Presidential Archives.

The CNDRA, Presidential Archives, and Ministry of Foreign Affairs Archives remained separate as late as 2009. The archives of the Ministry of Foreign Affairs were transferred to the CNDRA in 2015.

== Collections ==
The CNDRA holds the presidential papers of Edwin Barclay, William Tubman, William Tolbert, Samuel Doe, and Charles Taylor amongst others. It was reported in 2017 that the CNDRA held more than 1,000 boxes of presidential papers.

Among the CNDRA's most important collection items is the original Liberian Declaration of Independence and Liberian Constitution of 1847 which were rediscovered in a disused safe in 2013.

== See also ==
- University of Liberia

== Bibliography ==
- Herbert E. Angel (1975), Liberia: Government Archives and Records Service — the William V.S. Tubman Library Museum, Paris: Unesco
- Michael Roper (1983), Liberia: National Archives Centre (PDF), Technical Report, Paris: Unesco. (Includes information about new archives building on Tubman Boulevard in Monrovia)
- S.D.K. Ellis (2005). "A Visit to the National Archives of Liberia". African Research and Documentation. 49. UK. ISSN 0305-862X.
- Myles Osborne (2009). "A Note on the Liberian Archives". History in Africa. 36: 461–463. doi:10.1353/hia.2010.0012. S2CID 162715702.
- Araba Dawson-Andoh; Esmeralda Kale (2015), Cooperate, Preserve, Share: Improving access to primary source materials from Africa, International Federation of Library Associations and Institutions. (Includes information about Liberian national archives)
