= National Archives of Gabon =

Coordinates: 0.41414°N 9.4271°E

The National Archives of Gabon were founded in 1969.

== See also ==
- List of national archives
