= National Library of Togo =

- 6.129445208110366°N 1.2191031972373536°E
- Location: Lome, Togo
- Established: 1969

The National Library of Togo (Bibliothèque nationale du Togo) is the national library of Togo and is located in the capital, Lomé.

== See also ==
- National Archives of Togo
- List of national libraries

== Bibliography ==
- Republique Togolaise: Les bibliotheques (PDF), Rapport technique (in French), Paris: Unesco, 1977
- Marcel Lajeunesse, ed. (2008). "Togo: Bibliothèque nationale du Togo". Les Bibliothèques nationales de la francophonie (PDF) (in French) (3rd ed.). Bibliothèque et Archives nationales du Québec. OCLC 401164333.
- "Togo", World Report 2010, The Hague: International Federation of Library Associations, OCLC 225182140, archived from the original on 2019-06-29, "Freedom of access to information". (Includes information about the national library)
