= National Archives of the Cook Islands =

The National Archives of the Cook Islands (NACI) was created in 1974 in the Cook Islands for ensuring the safe storage of government, cultural and oral traditions of the nation. Originally housed in the Takitumu Hostel at Takamoa, the archives moved to the National Library of the Cook Islands building, and then in 1987 to the Takuvaine Valley Seismological Observatory.

The archives were badly damaged by Cyclone Sally in early 1987.

It has a collection of over 4,000 images of the islands in the 1950s from the Donald Stanley Marshall collection.

== See also ==
- List of national archives
