= National Library of Guinea-Bissau =

Public library in Guinea-Bissau

Public Library of the INEP (National Library) Biblioteca Pública do INEP
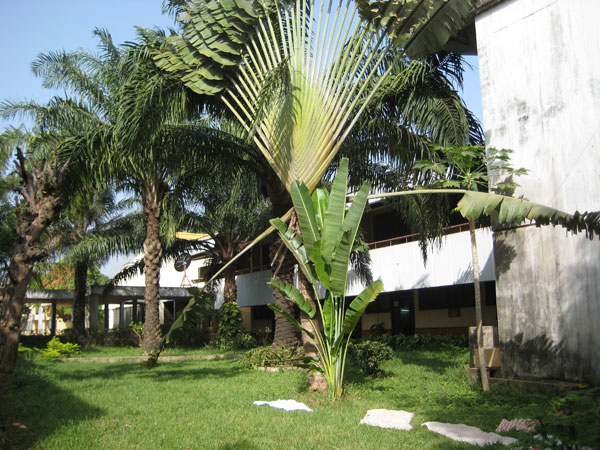
- The INEP, seat of the Public and National Library
- 11°51′23.9″N 15°36′36.6″W
- Location: Bissau, Guinea-Bissau
- Type: National library
- Established: 1984
- Reference to legal mandate: decreto-lei n.º 31/84, de 10 de Novembro der 1984

Collection
- Size: 70,000
- Legal deposit: Yes

Other information
- Director: Iacuba Djalo
- Website: http://www.inep-bissau.org/

The Biblioteca Pública do INEP is the national library of Guinea-Bissau and it is located in Bissau. It is also the biggest public library in the country and serves as library of the Universidade Amílcar Cabral.

It was founded in 1984 and inherited the library catalog of the colonial library in Portuguese Guinea.

It is part of the National Research Institute Instituto Nacional de Estudos e Pesquisa (INEP).

The american corner library at the INEP was opened in 2011. With its next embassy located in Dakar, Senegal, it is the only public American presence in the country.

The rich cultural patrimony of Guinea-Bissau, is hold together in this first library of the country.

Currently, a digitization project and training programme of the CPLP supports document conservation and electronic cataloging.

== See also ==
- Arquivos Históricos Nacionais da República da Guiné-Bissau
- List of national libraries

== Bibliography ==
- Marcel Lajeunesse, ed. (2008). "Guinée-Bissau". Les Bibliothèques nationales de la francophonie (PDF) (in French) (3rd ed.). Bibliothèque et Archives nationales du Québec. OCLC 401164333.
