= Slovak National Archives =

National archive of Slovakia

Coordinates: 48°9′36.1″N 17°4′56.2″E

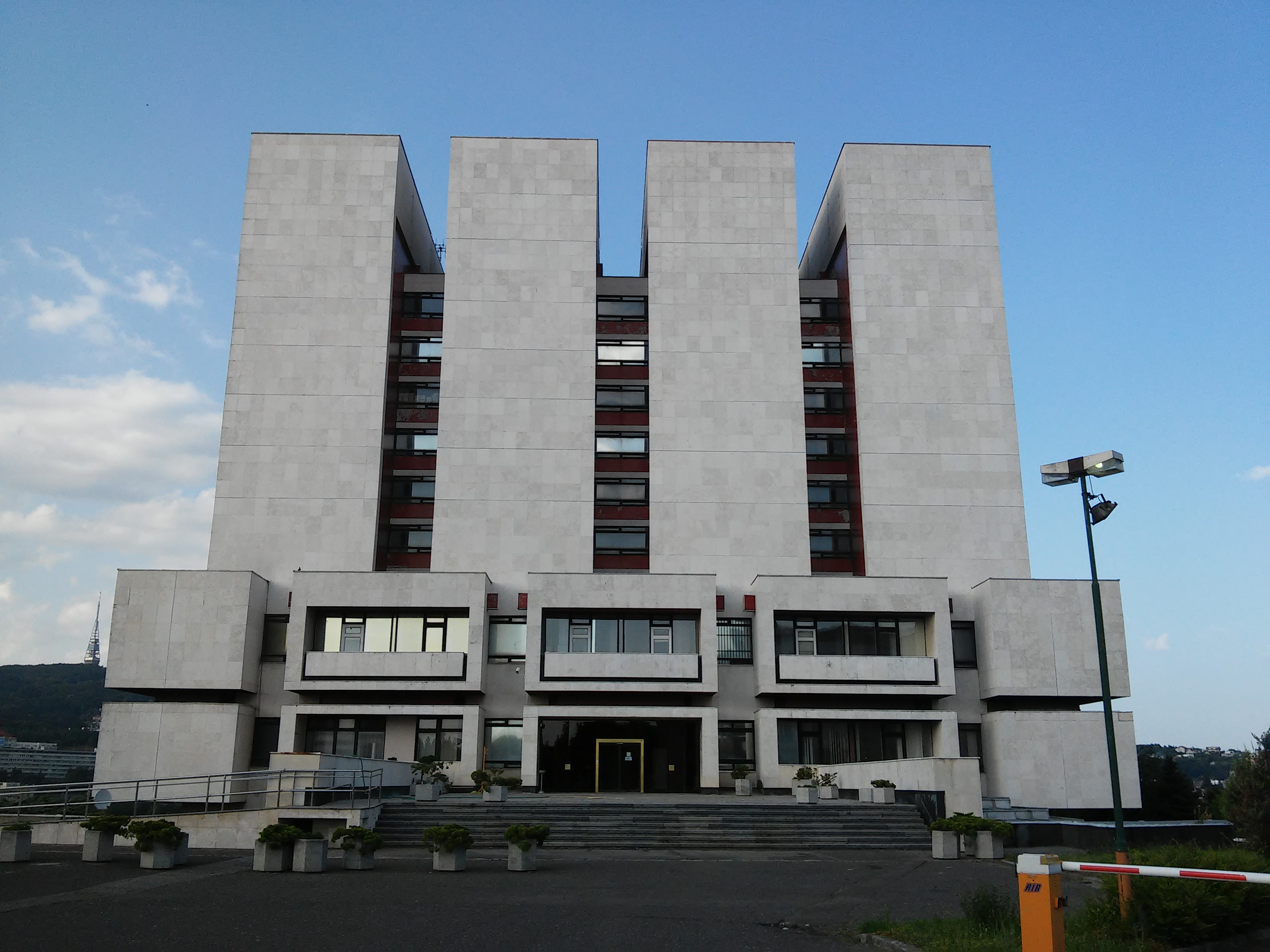
Headquarters in Bratislava

The Slovak National Archives (Slovak: Slovenský národný archív) were created in 1928. They are under the authority of the Minister of the Interior. They are located in Bratislava, Slovakia.

== See also ==
- List of national archives
