= Florence Ayivi Foliaon =

Beninese librarian

Florence Ayivi Foliaon (born December 12, 1935) is a former Beninese librarian.

Born in Bohicon, Ayivi Foliaon served as a supply director for a university between 1962 and 1967. In October of the latter year she was named to the post of director of the National Library of Benin. In this role she presided over the organization's expansion. She is currently retired.
