= National Archives of Myanmar =

National Agency

National Archives Department
- အမျိုးသားမှတ်တမ်းများမော်ကွန်းတိုက် ဦးစီးဌာန

Agency overview
- Formed: 1973; 53 years ago
- Superseding agency: Library of Secretaries
- Headquarters: Naypyidaw, Myanmar
- Agency executive: San Myint, Director-General
- Parent agency: Ministry of Planning and Finance
- Key document: National Records and Archive Law
- Website: www.nam.gov.mm

The National Archives of Myanmar, officially known as the Department of National Archives (NAD), is an agency of the Burmese government charged with collecting, safeguarding, and conserving national records and archives. The National Archives are housed in Naypyidaw's Ottarathiri Township and in Yangon's Dagon Township. The National Archives provides reference services and access to local and foreign researchers.

The National Archives is a member of the International Council on Archives (ICA) and Southeast Asia Regional Branch of International Council on Archives (SARBICA).

== Charter ==
The National Archives are governed by the National Records and Archive Law, first promulgated on 13 September 1990 and amended on 21 February 2007. The Defence Services Historical Research Institute separately maintains records pertaining to the Tatmadaw.

== History ==
The National Archives were preceded by the Library of Secretaries office, which collected only government publications), founded in 1972. The following year, the body was upgraded to a third-grade institution, to a second-grade institution in 1990, and to a first-grade department in 2012. The National Archive headquarters were relocated to Naypyidaw in May 2015.

== Collections ==
The National Archives houses historically significant documents and collections, including 34 parabaik and 5205 palm leaf manuscripts, colonial-era government publications, the Panglong Agreement, the Aung San-Attlee Agreement, the Nu-Attlee Agreement, and the Burmese Declaration of Independence. These records span from the last two kings of the Konbaung dynasty to the present-day. A notable item in the collection is a Maha Bandula palm-leaf manuscript that was transferred from Kolkata's Victoria Museum in 1987.

== See also ==
- List of national archives
