= National Archives of Haiti =

Coordinates: 18.538131°N 72.290196°W

- Interactive map of National Archives of Haiti
- Location: Haiti/Port-au-Prince, Port-au-Prince, Haiti
- Type: National Archives
- Website: https://dloc.com/collections/ianh

The National Archives of Haiti were first established in 1860. The archives hold the records of the office of the President and most government ministries. They are currently participating in the Digital Library of the Caribbean's Protecting Haitian Patrimony Initiative.

== History ==
The Archives Nationales d'Haiti (ANH) were created by a Presidential Decree on August 20, 1860. The Decree occurred under the government of Fabre Geffrard (1859-1867). The Decree established the "General Archives of Finances" which were the Republic of Haiti's first formal and official archives. Although the government had at an early time legislated on the issue of Archives, after Geffrard the institution was never granted the attention it deserved. From 1868 to 1921, the Archives was abandoned. This included the Celebration of the first Centennial of Independence in 1904. In 1922, the archives repository was moved to a premise which was initially built in 1905 to shelter a public market. While the new location addressed the problem of insufficient space, it did not improve upon the poor conservation conditions which had resulted in the loss of a large number of documents. 19 years passed before a Decree Law issued on October 20, 1941, changed the "Service in charge of the State's Archives" into the "National Archives."

The administrative context of the ANH changed several times over the last half of the 20th century, impacting its direction and the allocation of its resources. Between 1941 and 1975, a series of Decrees transferred the responsibility for the ANH from the Ministry of Finances to the Ministry of National Education (1961) to the Ministry of Justice (1974), where it remained until 1983. In an address delivered at the Seminar on the Acquisition of Latin American Library Materials in 2006, ANH Director Jean Wilfrid Bertrand described the institution's tenure under the Ministry of Justice as "its last dark years," wherein the ANH "was reduced to its merest expression" (certified translation). During this period, the Historical Archives repository was removed from the ANH and returned to the Central Office.

In 1983, Jean Wilfrid Bertrand was named the director general of the ANH; he continues to hold the position to the present day. A decree in 1986 established the ANH as an autonomous part of the Haitian government, and moved it under the administrative care of the Minister of Information and Public Relations in 1986 and then under the Minister of Culture and Communication.

== Mission statement ==
The mission of the National Archives of Haiti is to collect several types of documents including vital records, and financial, legal or administrative documents created by the Haitian government. The purpose of this is to create transparency in the view of the Haitian government and to inspire confidence in the rights of the government.

== Effect of the 2010 earthquake ==
Prior to the earthquake of 2010, the director, Jean Wilfrid Bertrand, has said that items in the archive were already damaged, destroyed or poorly housed. These items included civil registrations, and papers from the President, Ministries and Parliament. He has said that "since the earthquake, the situation is worse". In the meantime, he is working with the International Association of Francophone Archives (Association Internationale des Archives Francophone) who have been providing guidance since the earthquake. The Protecting Haitian Patrimony Initiative has worked to preserve the materials in the National Archives and other cultural heritage institutions by providing money, archival supplies, and help coordinating the assistance .

== Annexe 3 and digital archiving ==
Part of the purpose of the National Archives of Haiti is to provide birth, death and marriage records (vital records). A new program started in February 2018 helps provide these documents electronically to citizens. «Annexe 3» is the section that is working to digitize and distribute these records, supplying them to patrons as soon as they are requested. They are doing this by digitizing all of the registers from 1793 until the modern day. ANH hopes that this will help eliminate the documentation problems of Haitian citizens, such as fraudulent documents, the existence of multiple birth certificates, and late declarations. The Managing director of ANH in 2018 observed that 3 million Haitian citizens do not have their birth certificates and the purpose of this project is to help them prove their identity; as Jean Wilfrid Bertrand has remarked, one quarter of the population does not officially exist because they are not registered. This vital research is aided by category-specific informational documents that can be downloaded off of the ANH website.

== Legacy of colonialism ==
Though Haiti was one of the first colonies in the Americas to declare its independence, the enduring effects of French colonial rule over its national archives are apparent in the dispersion of archival materials outside of Haiti, the political and economic milieus which have dictated the historical development of the ANH, and the language in which much of Haiti's documentary heritage has been recorded. ANH Director Jean Wilfrid Bertrand has commented: “The Caribbean’s colonial past has weighed and still weighs heavily on the region’s future.” While the ANH possesses some holdings from their colonial era, such as registers of vital statistics, many more historical records central to Haiti's documentary heritage are held by the national archives of France and their trading partners, such as Spain and Britain. For example, no original or official copies of Haiti's Declaration of Independence were known to exist until 2010, when one was located by Julia Gaffield - a doctoral student at the time - in the UK's National Archives.

== See also ==
- List of national archives
