= National Library of Cameroon =

National Library Cameroon Bibliothèque nationale du Cameroun
- Formation: 1966
- Headquarters: Yaounde
- Coordinates: 3.8611940644516403°N 11.516500695387736°E

The National Library of Cameroon (French: Bibliothèque nationale du Cameroun) is the national library of Cameroon. It was established in 1966 and it is located in Yaoundé.

According to the United Nations, as of 2010 approximately 71 percent of adult Cameroonians are literate.

== See also ==
- Literature of Cameroon
- National Archives of Cameroon
- List of national libraries

== Bibliography ==
- Marcel Lajeunesse, ed. (2008). "Cameroun". Les Bibliothèques nationales de la francophonie (PDF) (in French) (3rd ed.). Bibliothèque et Archives nationales du Québec. OCLC 401164333.
- Charles Kamdem Poeghela (2011). "Où en seront les bibliothèques camerounaises dans dix ans?". Bulletin des bibliothèques de France (6).. (Brief mention of the library in national context)
