= Archives Nationales du Congo =

National archives of the Republic of the Congo

The Archives Nationales du Congo are the national archives of the Republic of the Congo. It is located in Brazzaville.

== See also ==
- List of national archives
