= West Indies Federal Archives Centre =

Official archive of the defunct federation, in Barbados

Coordinates: 13.1345°N 59.6297°W

The West Indies Federal Archives Centre is the official depository of records from the defunct West Indies Federation. The centre was opened in 2004, and is part of the University of the West Indies at Cave Hill in Barbados. Prior to the centre's opening, the West Indies archives were held by the Barbados National Archives.

== See also ==
- List of archives in Barbados
- List of national archives
