= National Archives of Rwanda =

The National Archives of Rwanda is located in Kigali. The earliest documents held in the Rwandan archives are from the 1890s. However, in 1959, as Belgium's imperial project was dissolving, most documents from Rwandan and German colonial rule that were held in Kigali were transferred to an archive in Usumbura, Burundi, which was also a Belgian colony at the time. A presidential decree formally established a government archive in 1979. The Rwanda Archives and Library Services Authority was established by the Law in 2014.

The archives were damaged during the violence of the Genocide against the Tutsi of 1994, and efforts to rebuild them did not begin until the 2000s. In 2013, the government signed a Memorandum of Understanding with a non-profit human rights group called Aegis to preserve documents related to the 1994 genocide. In January 2016, Aegis announced that a group of volunteers has been arranged to index 1.8 million documents in the archives' holdings. Some of these documents have now been made available online through the Ministry of Sports and Culture's website, but few documents from pre-genocide independent Rwanda are included.

According to the archives' official webpage, most of their holdings consist of: --Correspondence—Reports and Minutes—Letters—Procès-verbal—Telegrams—Action Plans—Travel Clearances—Memorandums—Communiqué—Organigrammes—Judicial Files—Projects—Diplomas—Certificates—Decisions—Invitations—Penal Code—Finance and Accounting

== See also ==
- List of national archives
- National Library of Rwanda
