= Centre des Archives Nationales (Lebanon) =

National archives in Beirut, Lebanon

The Centre des Archives Nationales—also known as the National Archives Center—serves as the official repository for Lebanon’s national records and documents. Headquartered in Beirut, it operates under the custody of the Prime Ministry and holds a mandate to collect, organize, and preserve the country’s documentary heritage.

== History ==
The Centre des Archives Nationales traces its origins to 17 January 1978, when President Elias Sarkis and Prime Minister Salim El-Hoss issued Decree No. 832. Under that decree, a public entity known as the National Archives Center was formed to oversee Lebanon’s archival records in all forms and formats.

In 1999, Law No. 162 defined the scope of “national archives” as any records or documents related to Lebanon’s cultural, political, administrative, or intellectual heritage, whether produced by public or private entities. The law emphasized that such materials—ranging from manuscripts and photographs to audiovisual recordings—must be safeguarded and, if needed, recovered from abroad.

On 8 March 2006, Decree No. 16527 replaced the original 1978 decree. This measure classified the institution as a public investment entity under the Prime Ministry. The restructured National Archives Center was tasked with:

- Organizing and safeguarding all forms of Lebanese national records.
- Maintaining a register of publications and issuing annual bulletins summarizing them.
- Printing, distributing, and promoting heritage-related materials.

== Administration and structure ==
A seven-member board of directors governs the Centre des Archives Nationales, with members appointed for three-year terms. By convention, the board represents Lebanon’s major religious communities, and its chair is occupied by a Grade 1 Director General who manages day-to-day operations.

The institution is organized into several departments:

=== Administrative and Financial Department (مصلحة الإدارية والمالية) ===
- Oversees personnel, budgeting, and procurement matters.
- Includes an Administrative Office, Financial Office, and Legal Office.

=== Preservation and Deposit Department (مصلحة الحفظ والايداع) ===
- Identifies preservation requirements and coordinates with governmental entities for long-term archival storage.
- Encompasses the Storage Office, Safekeeping Office, and Technical Office.

=== Research and Documentation Department (مصلحة الدراسات والتوثيق) ===
- Develops research standards and guidelines relating to Lebanese heritage.
- Maintains the Studies and Heritage Office, Library and Documentation Office, and PR and Publishing Office.
- Promotes public awareness of Lebanon’s historical legacy.

==== Staffing ====
The National Archives Center has 76 allocated positions distributed among five grades:

- Grade 1: 1 post
- Grade 2: 4 posts
- Grade 3: 19 posts
- Grade 4: 39 posts
- Grade 5: 13 posts

== Collections ==
The Centre des Archives Nationales houses materials spanning from the Ottoman era to modern times:

- Ottoman Records: Rare documents shedding light on Lebanon’s history under Ottoman rule; access is strictly controlled.
- Church Records: Records from various religious institutions that illustrate aspects of Lebanon’s cultural development.
- Contemporary Documents: Modern governmental, cultural, and administrative documents, including official papers related to the Lebanese state.

== Workforce challenges ==
Ongoing economic instability and the devaluation of the Lebanese Lira have severely affected the archive’s operations. Many employees have drastically reduced their working hours to as few as two days per week, impeding both everyday tasks and long-term projects.

== Budget ==
Operating under the Prime Ministry’s budget allocations, the National Archives Center received an annual budget of approximately LBP 1 billion in 2010, 2011, and 2012. Despite the legal obligation to gather and preserve documentation from both public and private sectors, the institution’s financial constraints limit its effectiveness.

== Access to documents ==
Per Law No. 162:

- Although certain public archives once open to the public remain accessible, the general public does not have direct access to the archive’s premises.
- The Centre des Archives Nationales specifies embargo periods for sensitive documents. These typically include:
  - A 50-year confidentiality period for records with information that could affect national security or individuals’ private affairs.
  - A 40-year confidentiality period for documents of a personal nature involved in legal proceedings.
- Early access for academic or scientific research may be granted after consulting with the original record creators, but original copies of documents cannot be used for commercial purposes.

== See also ==
- List of national archives
