= HMS Daphne (1838) =

Daphne-class Royal Navy corvette

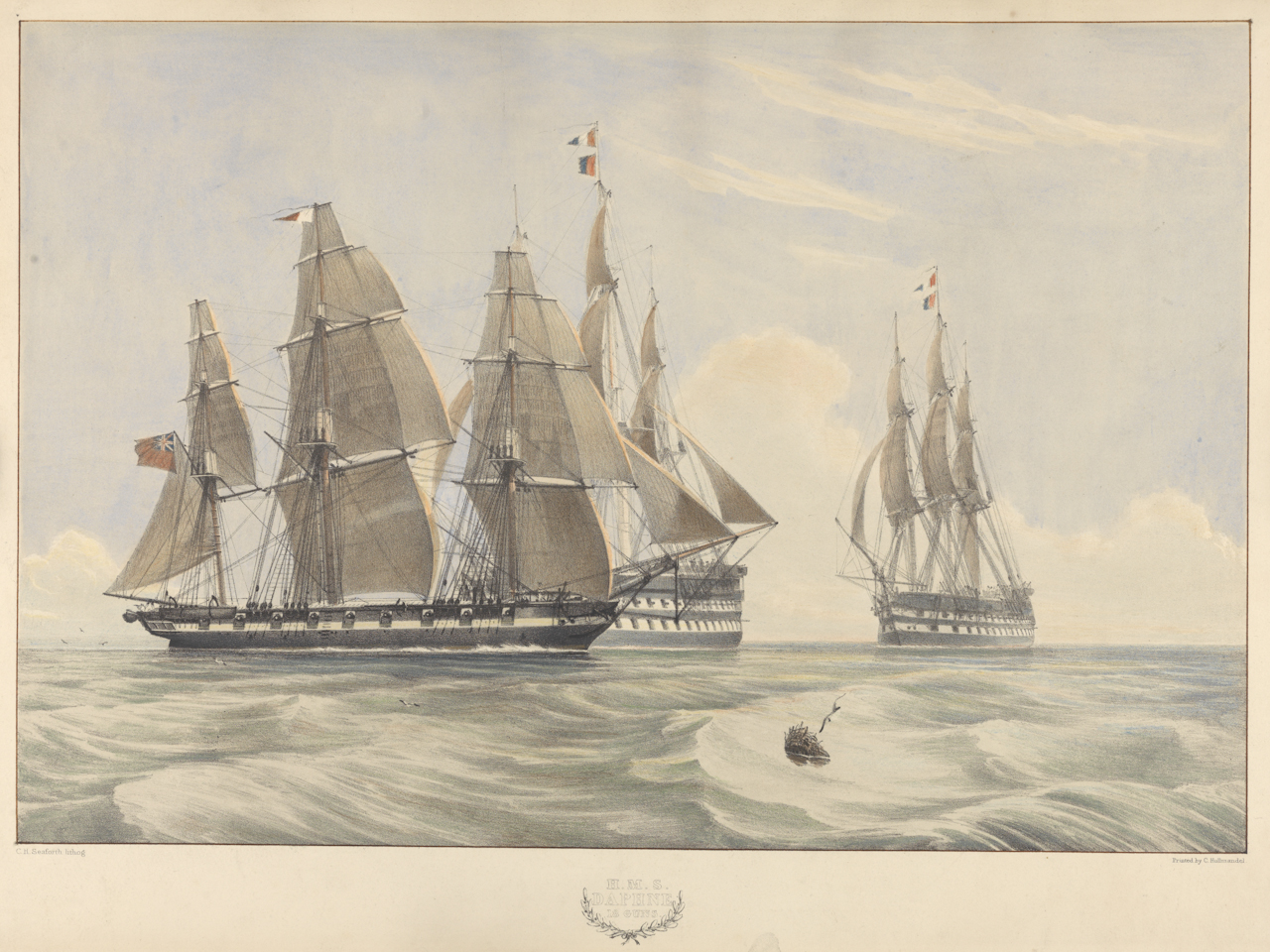
- Daphne in 1842

History

United Kingdom
- Name: HMS Daphne
- Ordered: 26 February 1834
- Builder: Pembroke Dockyard
- Cost: £13,515
- Laid down: December 1835
- Launched: 6 August 1838
- Commissioned: 2 February 1839
- Fate: Sold March 1864

General characteristics
- Class & type: Daphne-class corvette
- Tons burthen: 730 71/94 tons bm
- Length: 120 ft (36.6 m) (overall); 99 ft 5.5 in (30.3 m) (keel)
- Depth of hold: 18 ft (5.5 m)
- Propulsion: Sails
- Complement: 175
- Armament: 18 × 32-pounder guns

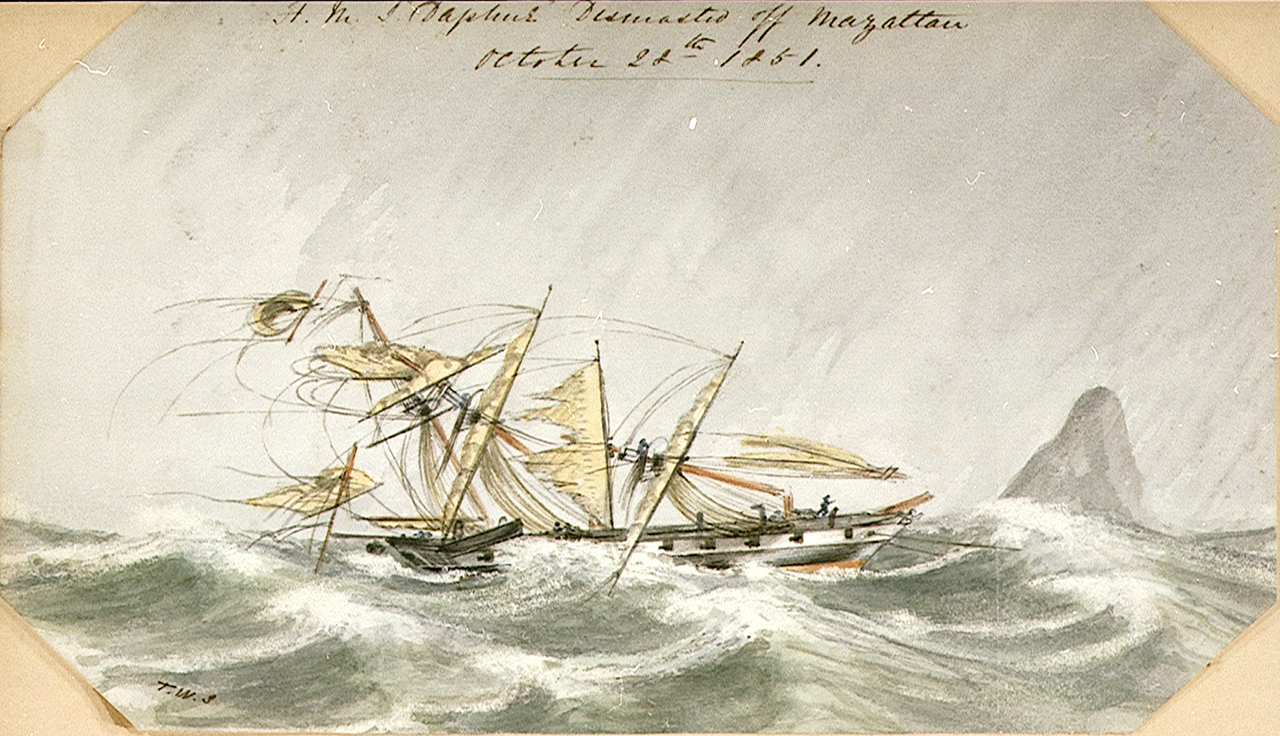
Daphne dismasted off Mazattan 28 October 1851

HMS Daphne was a Royal Navy corvette, the name ship of her class, commissioned in 1839

Daphne ran aground on the Horse Bank in the Solent on 5 January 1847. She was refloated with assistance from the paddle tug HMS Echo and towed to Spithead in Hampshire. She was repaired and returned to service.

Daphne was sold in 1866.
