= Jane Cameron National Archives =

National Archive overview
- Formed: 1998 (made national archives in 2010)
- Jurisdiction: Falkland Islands Government
- Headquarters: Jeremy Moore Avenue, Stanley, Falkland Islands
- Website: nationalarchives.gov.fk

The Jane Cameron National Archives are the official national archives of the Falkland Islands. Government records in the Falklands were started by the first Governor of the Falkland Islands, Richard Moody, in 1841. The records were initially kept in Stanley Town Hall and the Secretariat Building and remained largely intact, despite fires in 1944 and 1959.

In 1989 the Falkland Islands Government created the post of Government Archivist to look after the archives. The inaugural holder of the position was Jane Cameron, who was the granddaughter of a former Governor of the Falklands and a sibling to the Falkland Islands' UK Representative, Sukey Cameron. The archives were moved to a custom made building on Jeremy Moore Avenue in Stanley in 1998.

On 26 December 2009 Jane Cameron died from injuries she had sustained the previous month in a car crash while travelling in Argentina. In 2010 the archives were renamed in her honour and officially made the national archives of the Falklands.
