= National Library of Paraguay =

Coordinates: 25.2777°S 57.6570°W

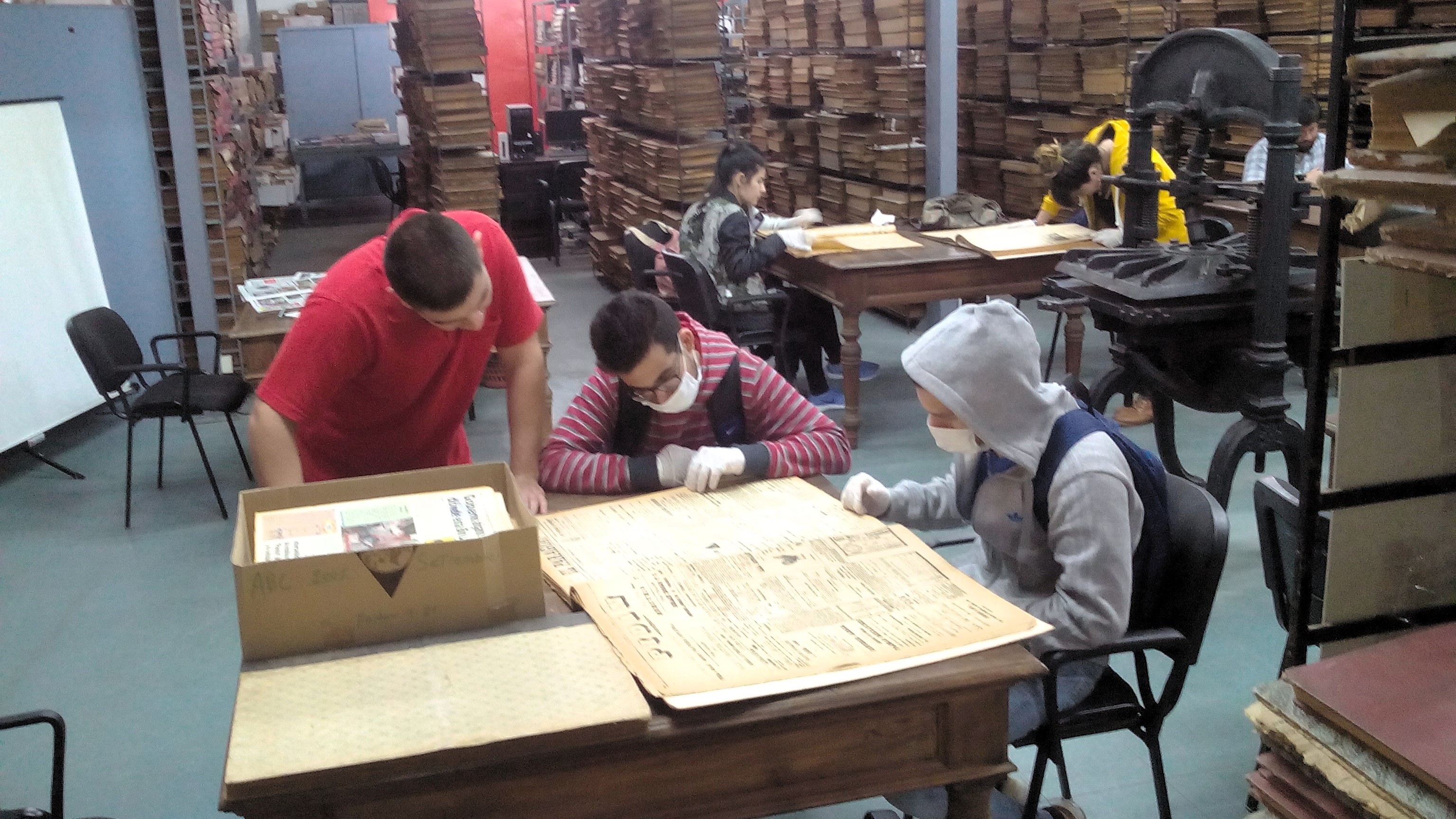

The National Library of Paraguay (in Spanish: Biblioteca Nacional del Paraguay) was created in 1887. It is the legal deposit and copyright library for Paraguay.
