= Palestine National Archives =

National archives of Palestine

Palestine National Archives (Arabic: الأرشيف الوطني, romanized: al-Arshīf al-Waṭanī) is the official national archives of the State of Palestine and the Palestinian National Authority. The archives are maintained by the Palestinian Ministry of Culture and are located in Ramallah.
