= National Archives of Tunisia =

National archives in Tunisia

Coordinates: 36.7997°N 10.1647°E

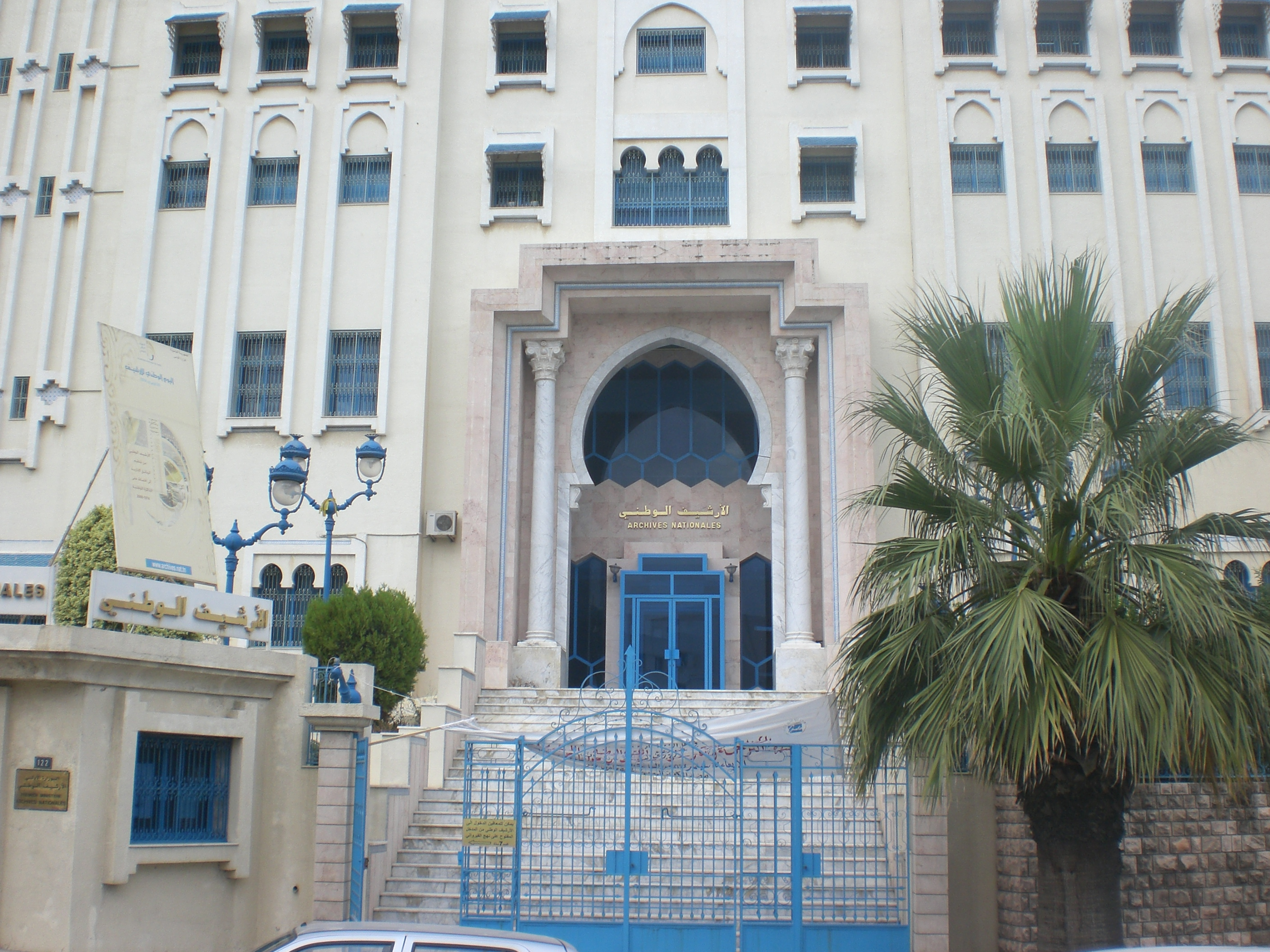
Entrance to the national archives headquarters in Tunis, 2008

The National Archives of Tunisia (French: Archives nationales de Tunisie), established in 1988, is headquartered in Tunis on the Boulevard du 9 Avril 1938. Among its holdings are materials generated by various government offices, such as the president, prime minister, and ministries of agriculture, commerce, culture, education, finance, health, social affairs, and transport.

== History ==
The Centre des correspondences de l’Etat formed in 1874, and became Archives générales du gouvernement in 1883. The archives became a "public institution in accordance with the stipulations of Act n° 88-95" in 1988. Its headquarters moved from the office of the prime minister in 1999 to its current building, designed by Samy Ateb and Fethi El Bahri. It is near the national library. Directors have included Moncef Fakhfakh (1986-circa 1993?) and Hédi Jallab (2011-circa 2016?).

== See also ==
- National Library of Tunisia

== Bibliography ==
- Robert Mantran (1961), Inventaire des documents d'archives turcs du Dar el-Bey (Tunis) (in French), Paris, OCLC 186237531
- Bessem Khouaja (2002–2003). "L'archivistique et les archives en Tunisie: aperçu de la situation actuelle". Archives (in French). 34. ISSN 0044-9423. "Archives nationales"
- Houda Ben Hamouda (2014). "L'accès aux fonds contemporains des archives nationales de Tunisie: un état des lieux" [Access to contemporary holdings of the National Archives of Tunisia: an inventory]. L'Année du Maghreb (in French). 10 (10): 41–48. doi:10.4000/anneemaghreb.2010. ISSN 2109-9405 – via Revues.org.
