= Arquivos Históricos Nacionais da República da Guiné-Bissau =

The Arquivos Históricos Nacionais da República da Guiné-Bissau (AHN; 'National Historical Archives of Guinea-Bissau') formed on 10 November 1984 per government decree 31/84. Part of the Instituto Nacional de Estudos e Pesquisa, the archives is located on Avenida dos Combatentes da Liberdade da Pátria in Bissau.

== History ==
Some of the AHN's collection derives from the colonial-era Centro de Estudos da Guine Portugesa.

During the Guinea-Bissau Civil War, the archives suffered destruction and damage to more than half of its holdings.

== See also ==
- National Library of Guinea-Bissau
- History of Guinea-Bissau
