= Archivo General de la Nación (Mexico) =

Mexican National archive

Archivo General de la Nación (México)
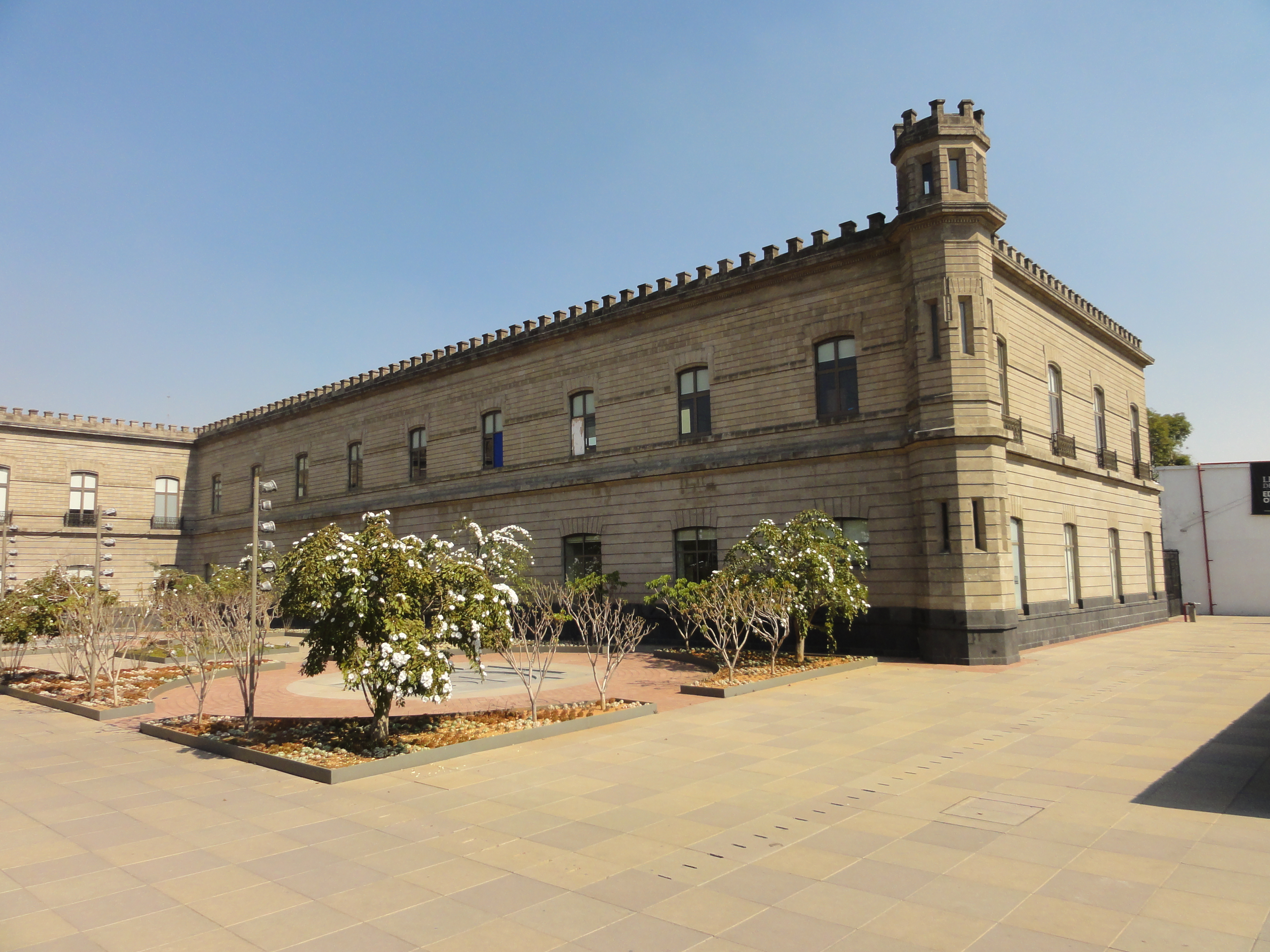
- The main building in 2011
- 19.4363°N 99.1132°W
- Location: Mexico City

Other information
- Website: www.gob.mx/agn

The Archivo General de la Nación (Spanish for "General Archive of the Nation"; abbreviated AGN) is charged by the Mexican state to "be the governing body of the national archives and the central consultative entity of the Federal Executive." The historian Edmundo O'Gorman was its general director from 1938 until 1952.

Since 1980, the archives have been housed in the Palacio de Lecumberri in Mexico City, a former prison.

== See also ==
- List of national archives
