= National Archives of Benin =

Beninese government agency

- Archive Nationale Du Bénin

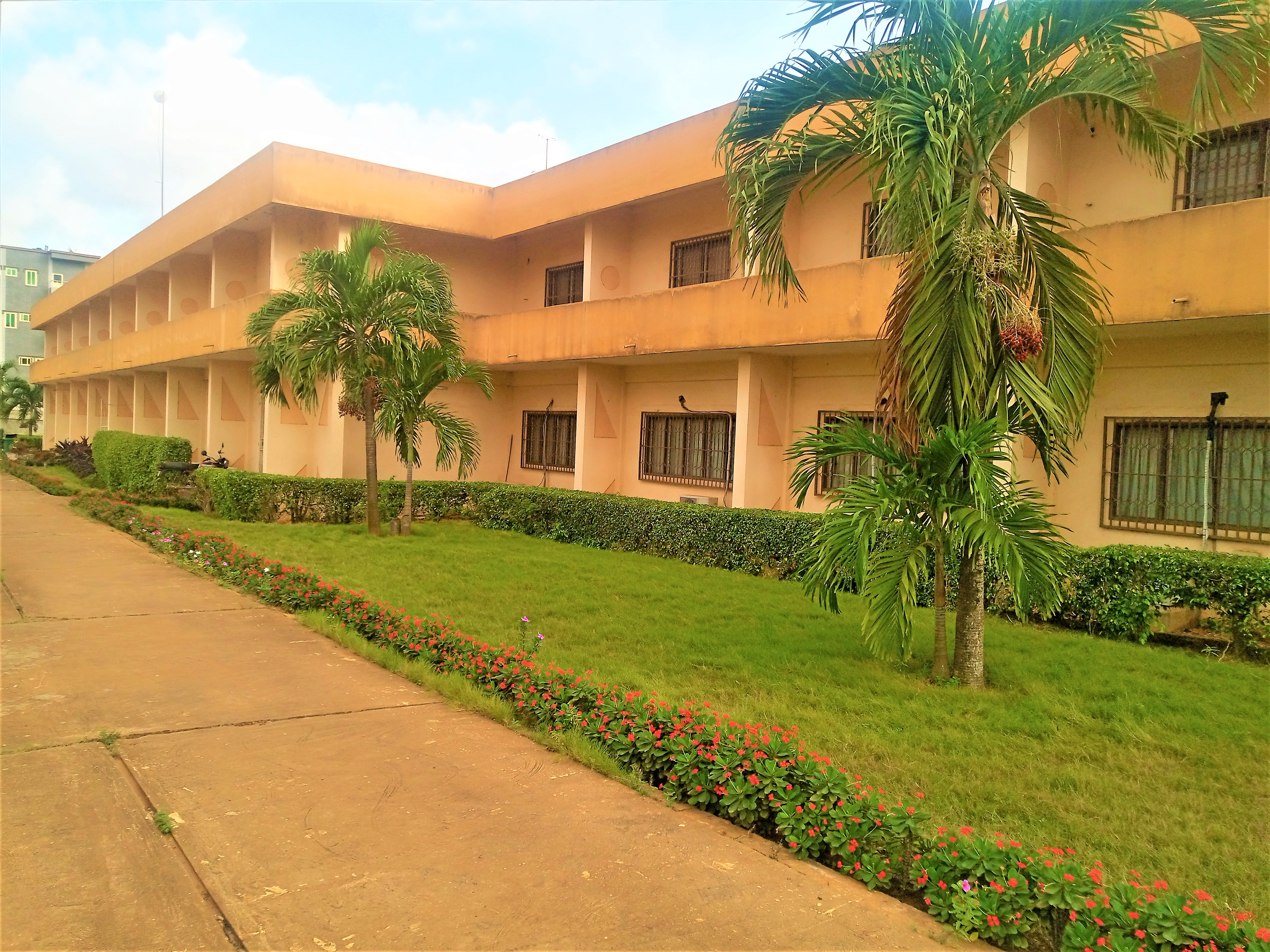
- National Archives of Benin in 2021

Agency overview
- Preceding agency: Dahomey Archives Service
- Headquarters: Porto-Novo, Benin
- Agency executive: Mathias Massodé, Director
- Parent agency: President of Benin
- Website: archivesnationales.gouv.bj

The National Archives of Benin (French: Archives nationales du Bénin) are located in capital city Porto-Novo, Benin. The archives were established on March 3, 1914, on the order of Governor William Ponty.

== History ==
The National Archive originated from the creation of the Dahomey Archives Service, ordered by Governor William Ponty on 1 July 1913. This order established an archive respository in all the capital cities of the colonies of French West Africa. The Dahomey repository became operational on 3 March 1914.

As Benin gained independence from France, the archive changed and developed which included multiple location changes. Due to storage constraints during this time, a number of documents were abandoned. In 1976, the National Archive of Benin was established as a directorate; and the current main building was opened by 1984. Around this time, the National Archive of Benin developed a program for students at the National University of Benin. In 1990, the National Archive moved into a democratic era partnership with attachment to the Presidency of the Republic of Benin. This was repeated in 2007.

To commemorate the Archives' centenary, a training workshop was held on November 13, 2014. The central theme of the workshop was the adoption of the international standards for archival description, ISAD (G) and ISAAR (CPF), and the subsequent use of open-source software for archive management. More recently, on April 3, 2020, Médrique Awangonou published a book concerning the history of the national archives of Dahomey (now the Republic of Benin) from 1914 to 2014, covering topics within the field of Human Sciences.

== Archives and services ==
=== Colonial Archive ===
The colonial archive constitutes a major part of the collection, comprising reports and correspondence spanning the period from 1843 to 1960, which covers the era of Western colonization in West Africa. These documents are historically significant, offering insights into the lives of traditional kings and leaders, the dissemination and evolution of both Islam and Christianity, and the various forms of anti-colonial resistance. The archive was initially created by the colonial administration to safeguard its administrative records and serves to preserve the actions of the many individuals who contributed to the country's history. In recognition of its global importance, UNESCO added this collection to its Memory of the World International Register in 1997.

In 2017, the archive secured funding from the British Library for a major digitization project. The goal was to digitize records relating to the abolition of slavery, which would drive a greater understanding of the relationship between Africans and Europeans in the country during that period. The project successfully digitized 60% of the colonial court records available in Benin, resulting in the creation of 71,224 digital images that cover the time span from 1900 to 1960.

=== User services ===
The Archives provide the following primary services:

- Bookbinding studio with equipment for document restoration
- Reprography, made available to researchers through its communication service, including 2 photocopy machines
- Information services for entry of research instruments and for management of personal recollections, theses, and newspaper card indexes. A microfilm reader is available.

== See also ==
- National Library of Benin
- List of national archives
