= National Archives of Ecuador =

- Interactive map of National Archives of Ecuador
- 0.21463553966892965°S 78.50316871817802°W
- Alternative name: Archivo Histórico Nacional del Ecuador
- Location: Quito, Ecuador
- Established: 1884
- Period covered: 1538-1980
- Website: Official website

The National Archives of Ecuador (Spanish: Archivo Nacional del Ecuador) was created on 17 January 1884, under the auspices of President José María Plácido Caamaño. The present organizational structure was created in 1938. The National Archives is located in Quito, with a branch in San Juan de Ambato.

The historical archive covers the years 1538 to 1980, divided into four historical periods: the colonial period; Ecuador as part of Gran Colombia; the independence struggle; and the period of the republic.

The Director of the National Archives is doctora Rocío Pazmiño Acuña.
