= National archives =

Archives of a country

National archives are the archives of a country. The concept evolved in various nations at the dawn of modernity based on the impact of nationalism upon bureaucratic processes of paperwork retention.

== Conceptual development ==
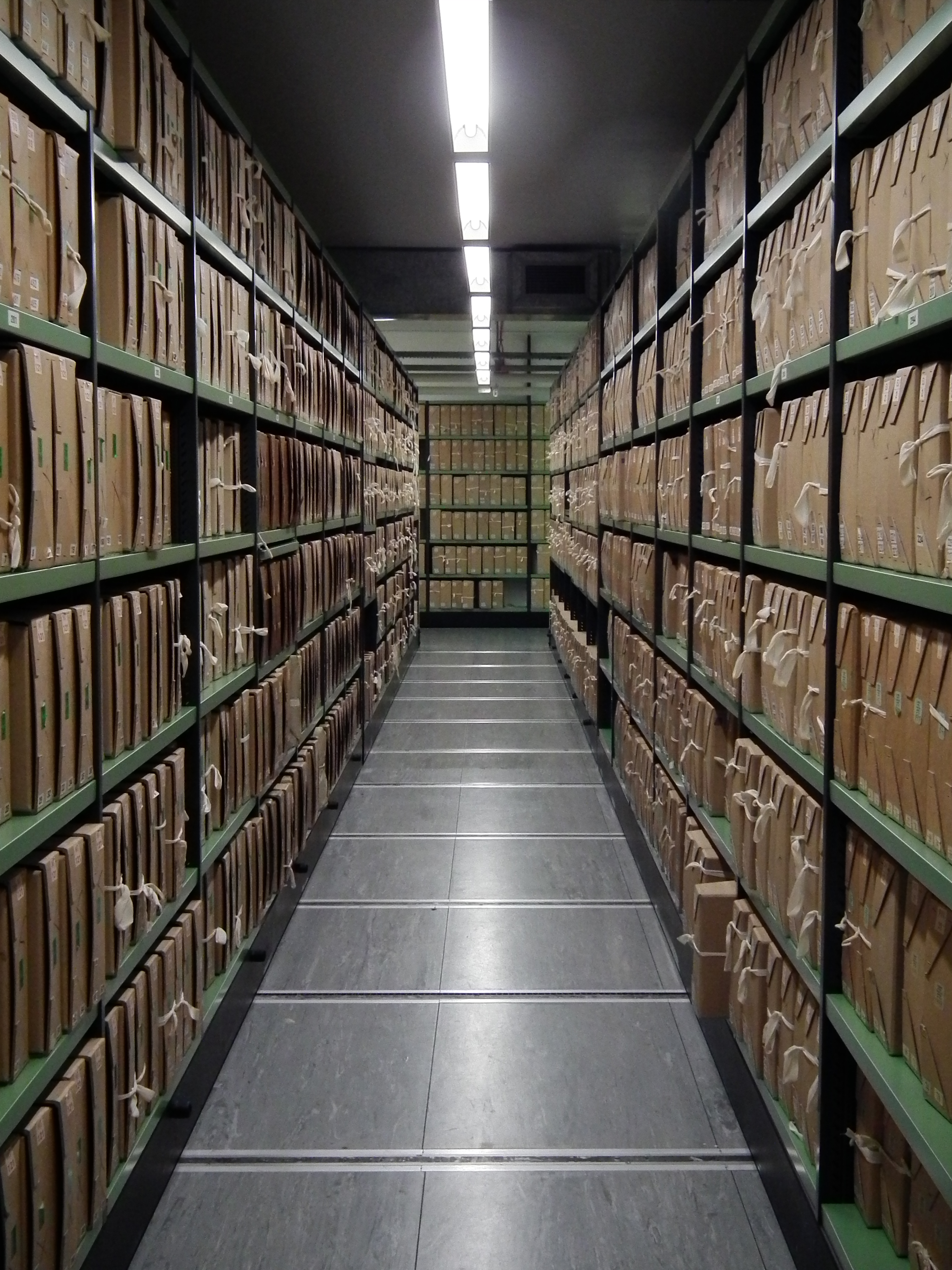
"Although the most basic and essential task of a national archives is to serve the interests of the government itself, and to preserve and make available evidence protecting the rights of citizens, it has other responsibilities of far-reaching importance. Foremost among these is its role as a source of enlightenment an improvement for all segments of society."

From the Middle Ages into the Early modern period archives generated by royal and clerical institutions retained proofs of political and genealogical claims as a "bastion of authenticity." The emerging Enlightenment concept of studying history as a science rather than as literature was influenced by Leopold von Ranke and brought archives into the limelight of serious historical study. In the late 18th century, the storage of old records was divided. Business records in the archives courantes went the way of records management while documents of cultural import in the archives historiques formed the core of Western-conceived archives. As the popularity of archives increased as a function of substantiating historical narratives, national archives were purposed towards telling their respective nation's story. For example, the National Historical Archive of Spain as created excluded contemporary records in favor of documenting defunct institutions as a matter of national heritage. Historian Nicholas Dirks has said that national archives are the "primary site of state monumentality."

The 19th-century centralization of archives, precursor to the 20th century's nationalism, has been opposed by some. Historian Craig Robertson posits that "archives do not neutrally store documents; rather, objects captured through archival practices are transformed into knowledge." He goes on to say that the "historicization of state archives can make explicit how archives create national narratives and, more importantly, national characters, prioritizing and privileging specific stories and peoples." The concept of the archivist as a custodian of records originated in the late 19th century and was championed by Hilary Jenkinson. His concept, that "the Archivist is not and ought not be an Historian" and that the archivist "is the servant of his Archives first and afterwards of the student Public" reflect the idea that archivists should primarily serve as objective custodians of records. This contrasted with the prior practice of archives serving to embellish the histories of politicians and other wealthy patrons. The retention of records in a national archive would then become a universal bureaucratic norm rather than the retention of a select few records for a predetermined purpose. Jenkinson also specified that rather than holding source documents piecemeal, that the integrity of an organic archive group must be maintained.

Political impact on the administration of archives has been common in both dictatorships and democracies.

== By region/country ==
=== Canada ===
"Canadian Archives are the foundation of Canadian Studies."

— Thomas Symons

The Dominion Archives were created in 1872. Having been created so soon after confederation, the new nation had few records to archive since most colonial records had been taken back to Europe. The first Dominion Archivist, Douglas Brymner, and his successor, Arthur Doughty, practiced the 'total archives' concept collecting all manner of Canadiana in contrast to Hilary Jenkinson's 'organic whole' concept. The mandate of the archive shifted from pure documentation toward social memory. Canada's National Archive (then called the Public Archives) was not created until 1912. The national library was created in 1952 and became a component of the archives with the Library and Archives of Canada Act in 2004. Regardless of the relative newness of the archive, Canadians reacted to the 1945 disappearance of papers from the archives about Igor Gouzenko as if it were a disturbing case of collective memory-loss. Public response to reportage from The Halifax Herald indicated that the archives were already seen as both a matter of government accountability and as an element of national identity.

=== France ===
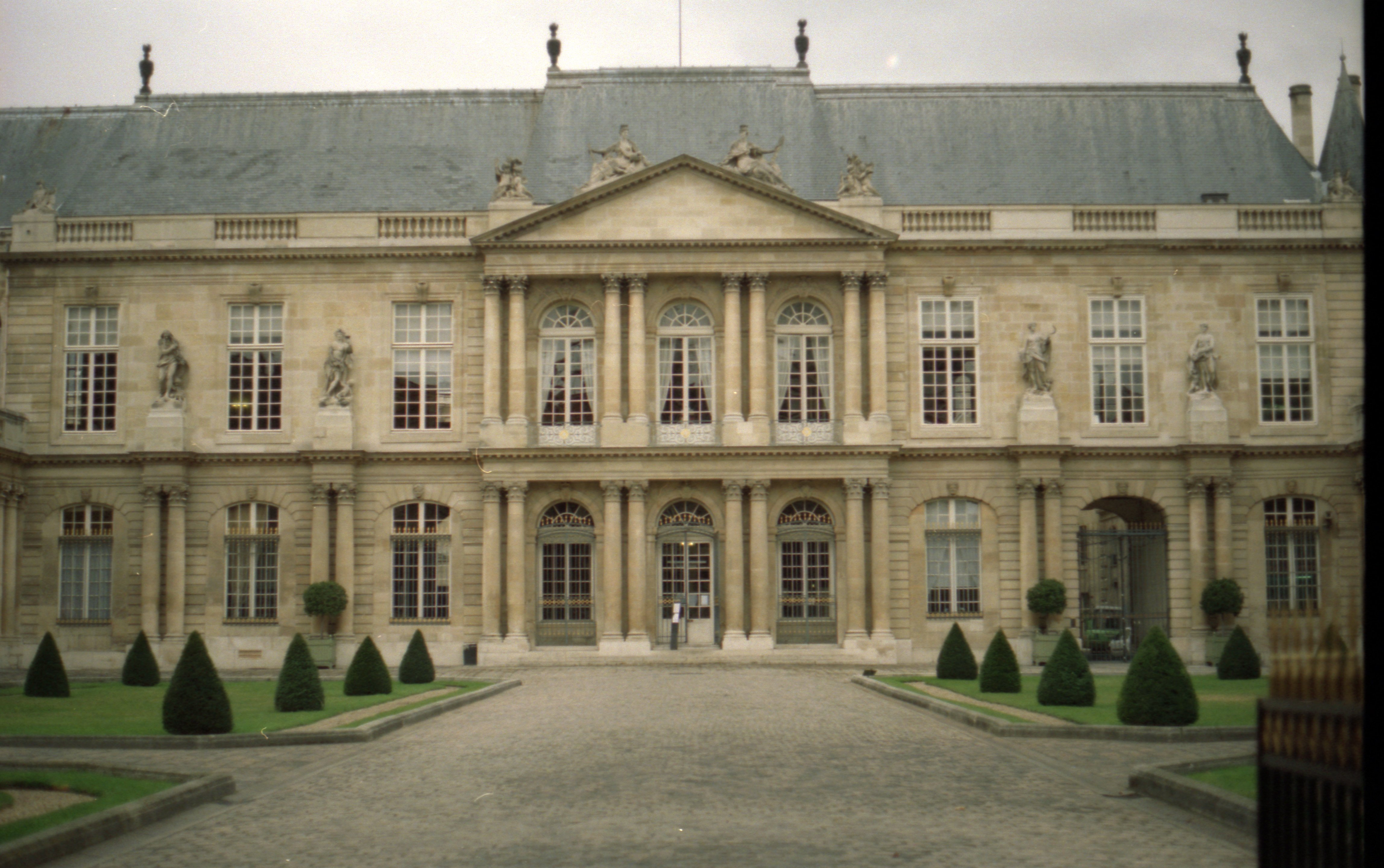
Since its creation, the Archives Nationales has been purposed to making records available to the people.

The National Archives of France was created informally on July 29, 1789 by the Revolutionaries to document the prior Ancien Régime. The crown's Treasury of Charters as well as private records from the clergy were collected for historical value as those parties were deemed irrelevant to French society. Separately, as of September 9, 1790, the new regime collected contemporaneous documents as "the depository of all acts that establish the constitution of the kingdom, the rights of its public, its laws" (ergo a new public record). Thus the National Archives served to house practical documents from the First Republic onwards while the National Library of France became the center of historical study. The changing view of the 19th Century began merging the two concepts of the "historically important" records and the "bureaucratic transactional" records. Archivists trained at the French National School of Paleography and Archival Studies were charged with maintaining records as a factor of accountability to the public. Jenkinson, a luminary of British archival practice, specifically criticized the French and Belgian accessions of isolated private documents into national archives, saying "we cannot think that a stray paper from some dispersed family collection... is a fit inmate for a National Archive Establishment." He characterized the combination like a melange of the Manuscripts Commission and the Public Record Office, a merger which would happen in the UK some 90 years later.

=== Latin America ===
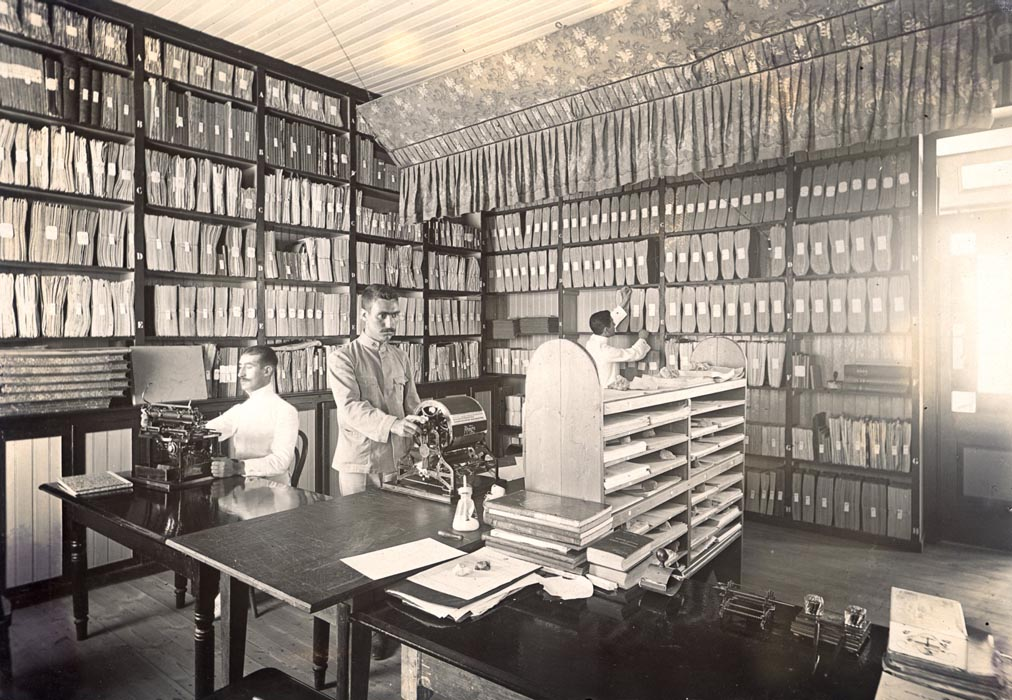
Bernardino Rivadavia said the "conservation of the archives of a country assures without doubt for history the most accurate materials and documents relating to it."

The various national archives of Latin American countries were founded in the 19th and 20th centuries. Much of those archives benefited from the Spanish and Portuguese colonial practice of keeping a record on hand of outgoing correspondence. Copies of orders from the monarchy were kept in the General Archive of the Indies or the Arquivo Histórico Ultramarino while the message itself would be sent to the New World and then archived by the respective viceroy in the Americas. The colonial offices would likewise keep a copy of their outgoing message locally while sending the original note to the home office in Europe. Roscoe R. Hill opined in 1945 that although very old records had been kept in Latin American archives, the archives themselves were mismanaged and the climate damaged many documents. The retention of records by so many government agencies as well as provincial offices has resulted, in Hill's words, that "in no country is the national archive really national in scope."

=== New Zealand ===
The national archives of New Zealand and its sister organization, the National Library of New Zealand, reflect the 20th-century influence of biculturalism on the interpretation of much older archival material for the purposes of legitimating the nation in view of shared Anglo-Māori history. Although the imperial records donated by Alexander Turnbull were not originally collected to write a national history they have been reinterpreted to explain cultural conflicts in an era of empire-building. Anecdotes from former Soviet Republics such as Uzbekistan evince this mentality of politicization of national archives; that the archives may contain dangerous truth the regime must contain.

=== United Kingdom ===
The National Archives were formed in 2003, as a merger of the much older Public Record Office (created in 1838) and the Historical Manuscripts Commission. The records of England originate in the Chancery Archives and the tax accounting records of the Pipe rolls, the Memoranda Rolls of the Exchequer, and the feet of fines dating back to 1163. Without the funding to archive this mass of records, many were destroyed in the early 19th century. The English Public Record Office Act 1877 specified the arbitrary date of 1715, for records too old to be discarded thereby describing contemporaneous constructions of historical importance. The Office of Public Sector Information (successor to Her Majesty's Stationery Office) was merged into the archives in 2006.

In addition, archives relating exclusively to Scotland (both historically as a sovereign state and since 1707 as a constituent part of the United Kingdom) are held in the National Archives of Scotland, established under its present name in 1999, but with roots dating back to the 13th century. Similarly archives relating exclusively to Northern Ireland are held in the Public Record Office of Northern Ireland, established in 1923. There is no national archives as such for Wales, but some important series of records relating exclusively to the government of Wales (for example, those of the Court of Great Sessions) have been transferred to the custody of the National Library of Wales.

=== United States ===
Although the U.S. National Archives Establishment was not created until 1934, it was preceded by numerous private and state archives, including the Massachusetts Historical Society, the first organized collection of American records created in 1791. The value of United States state archives centered on the provenance of their records while driven by the local narratives of their benefactors. The 11th United States Congress investigated the state of government records in 1810, finding the records on hand were "in a state of great disorder and exposure; and in a situation neither safe nor convenient nor honorable to the nation." The committee recommended fireproofing and safe storage only four years before the Burning of Washington. Although the reconstruction after the fire did not include the creation of a national archive, an archive at the State Department's passport office had been in existence as early as the 1820s. There was no serious interest in establishing a national "hall of records" until the late 19th Century and despite some 43 fires in various federal buildings between 1880 and 1915, legislation to create such an archive could not pass Congress. Since its founding in 1884, the American Historical Association (AHA) voiced concern over the lack of a national archive, especially in light of continued losses of records. Led by J. Franklin Jameson, the AHA's goal in the establishment of a national archives was the collection of germane documents to substantiate conceptions of national history. After a series of further delays, the National Archives Act of 1934 was passed by the 73rd United States Congress just as the construction of the National Archives Building (started in 1931) was nearing completion. The National Archives and Records Administration has been advertised as an agency of narrative; the archives' façade claims "The Glory and Romance of Our History are Here Preserved." Allen Weinstein said in 2005 that archive employees are "the designated custodians of America's national memory."

== See also ==
- List of national archives
