= Memory of the World Register in Africa =

UNESCO's Memory of the World International Register lists documentary heritage – texts, audio-visual materials, library and archive holdings – that have been judged to be of global importance. The register brings that heritage to the attention of experts and the wider public, promoting the preservation, digitization, and dissemination of those materials. The first inscriptions were added to the register in 1997. As of 2025, 570 pieces of documentary heritage were included in the register. Of these, 41 are from Africa. They include recordings of folk music, ancient languages and phonetics; aged remnants of religious and secular manuscripts; collected lifetime works of renowned figures of literature, science, and music; copies of motion pictures and short films; and accounts documenting changes in the world’s political, economic and social stage.

In additional to the international register, there is a regional register for Africa, maintained by the Africa Regional Committee of the Memory of the World Programme (ARCMoW). As of August 2026, it has two inscriptions, both in the Institute of National Archives of Cabo Verde. The country of Ghana has its own national register, maintained by the Ghana National Committee for UNESCO Memory of the World Programme. As of August 2026, this has nine inscriptions.

== List by country/territory ==
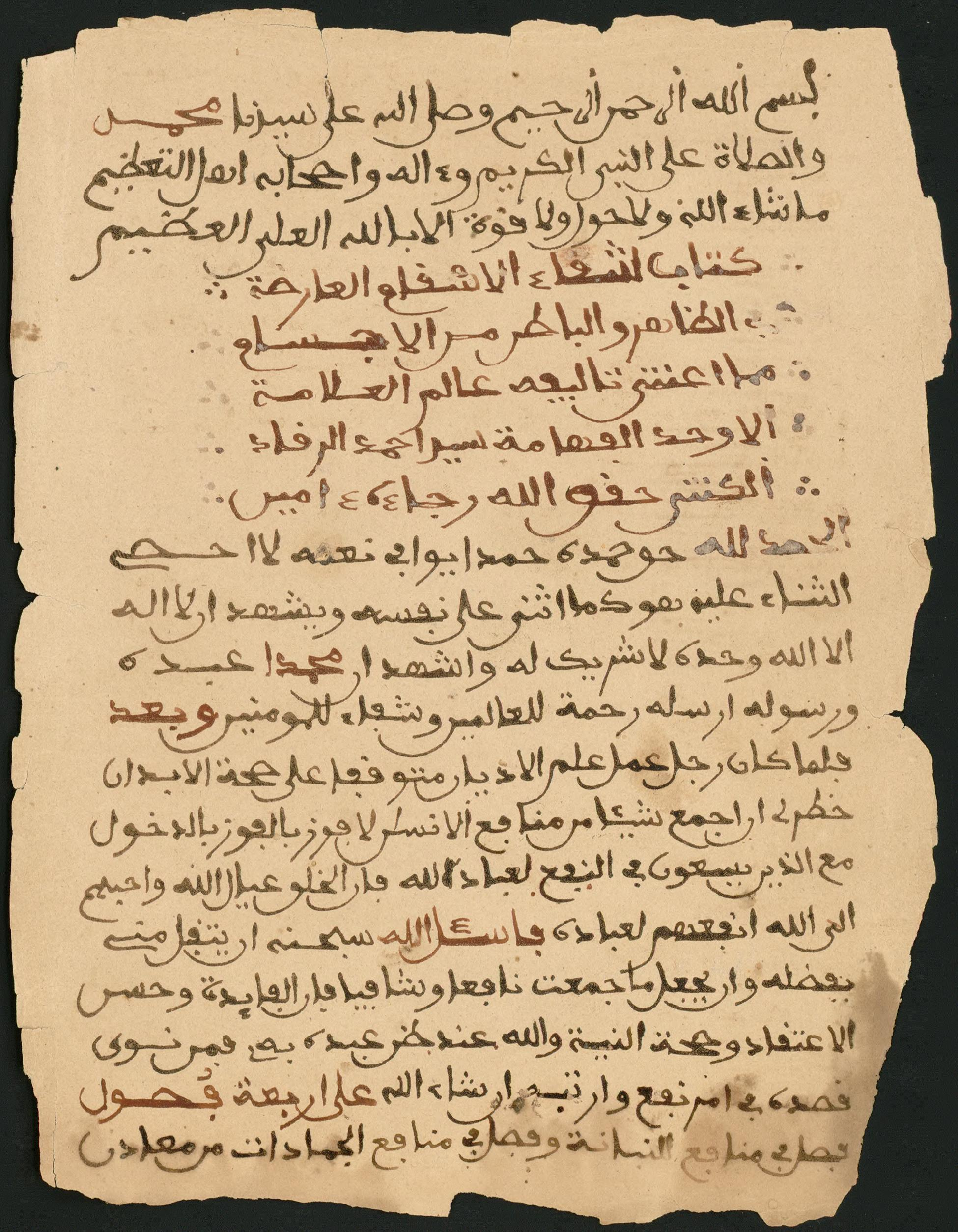
The Book of Healing from internal and external diseases affecting the body, a 17th-century magico-medical manuscript in Timbuktu, Mali

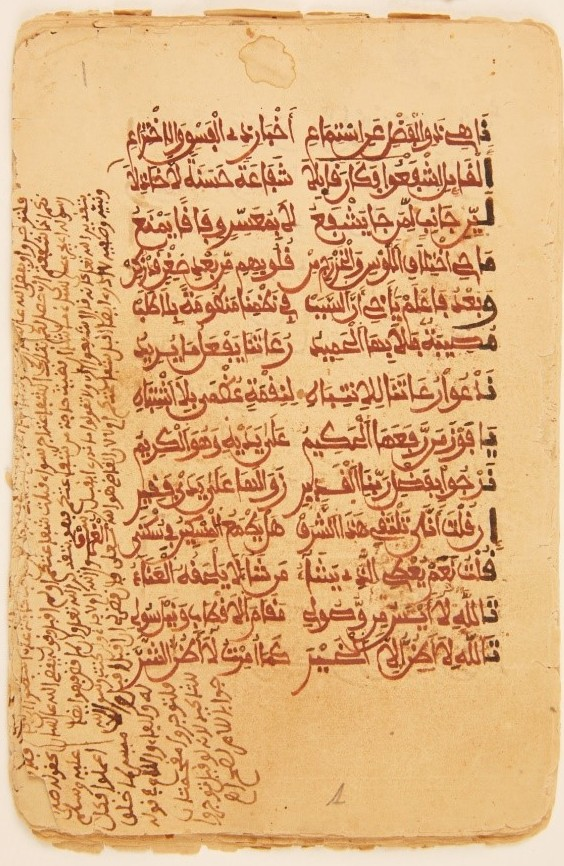
Reminder to those who do not pay attention to the harms caused by the divergence between believers, an acrostic poem in Timbuktu, Mali

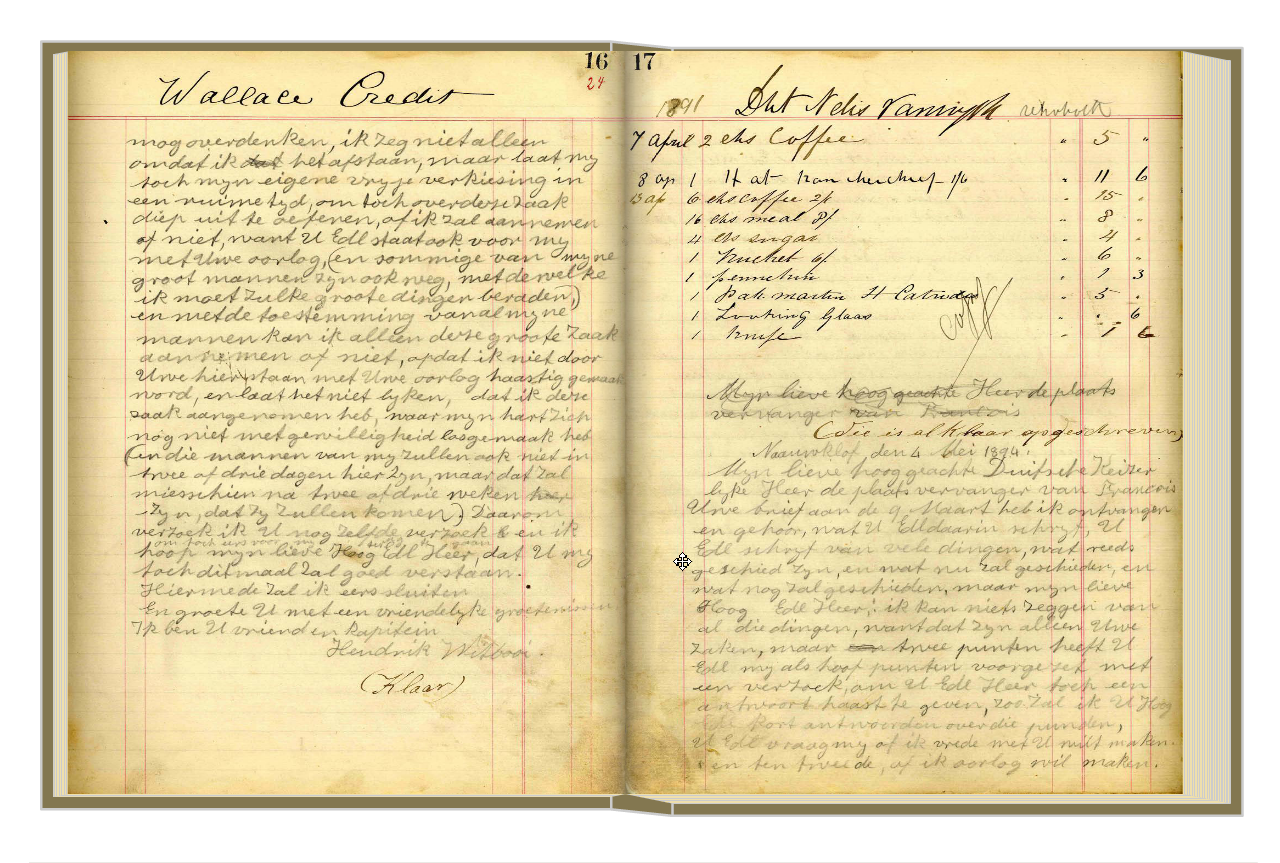
Pages from the Letter Journals of Hendrik Witbooi, National Archives of Namibia

Documentary heritage^{[A]}	Country/Territory	Custodian(s), Location(s)	Year inscribed	Reference
Christopher Okigbo Collection	Africa	Christopher Okigbo Foundation, Brussels 50°49′33″N 4°22′32″E	2007	
Al-Mustamlah Min Kitab Al-Takmila	Algeria	National Library of Algeria, Algiers 36°44′55″N 3°04′19″E	2017	
First Summit Meeting of the Non-Aligned Movement Archives	Algeria, Egypt, India, Indonesia, Serbia	Egyptian National Library and Archives, Cairo 30°03′59″N 31°13′39″E; National Archives of India, Delhi 28°36′57″N 77°13′03″E; National Archives of the Republic of Indonesia, South Jakarta 6°16′43″S 106°49′11″E; Archives of Yugoslavia, Belgrade 44°47′21″N 20°26′31″E; National Archives of Algeria, Algiers 36°43′44″N 3°03′31″E	2023	
Kitab Al-Qanun fi Al-Tibb: the Book of Medical Laws (Book Four)	Algeria	National Library of Algeria, Algiers 36°44′55″N 3°04′19″E	2025	
Arquivos dos Dembos / Ndembu Archives	Angola, Portugal	Arquivo Nacional de Angola, Luanda 8°49′04″S 13°13′52″E	2011	
Colonial archives	Benin	National Archives, Porto-Novo 6°30′39″N 2°36′25″E	1997	
Documents on Slavery in the Archives of the General Secretariat of the Government (Cabo Verde, 1842-1869)	Cape Verde	National Archives Institute of Cape Verde, Praia 14°55′00″N 23°30′27″W	2025	
Memory of the Suez Canal	Egypt	Egyptian Embassy, Paris 48°52′04″N 2°17′46″E; Suez Canal Authority, Ismailia 30°35′18″N 32°16′57″E; Institut du Monde Arabe, Paris 48°50′56″N 2°21′25″E	1997	
Deeds of Sultans and Princes	Egypt	National Library and Archives of Egypt, Cairo 30°04′02″N 31°13′38″E	2005	
Persian Illustrated and Illuminated Manuscripts	Egypt	National Library and Archives of Egypt, Cairo 30°04′02″N 31°13′38″E	2007	
National Library of Egypt's Collection of Mamluk Qur'an Manuscripts	Egypt	National Library and Archives of Egypt, Cairo 30°04′02″N 31°13′38″E	2013	
Treasures from National Archives and Library Organizations	Ethiopia	National Archives and Library, Addis Ababa 9°01′04″N 38°44′58″E	1997	
Dutch West India Company (Westindische Compagnie) archives	Ghana, Netherlands, Brazil, Guyana, Suriname, United Kingdom, United States	National Archives of Ghana, Accra 5°33′40″N 0°12′29″W	2011	
Royal Archives (1824–1897)	Madagascar	Department of National Archives, Antananarivo 18°54′24″S 47°31′09″E	2009	
Kitāb Shifā al-Asqām al-Āriḍat min al-Ẓahir wa al-Bāṭin min al-Ajsām/the Book of Healing from internal and external diseases affecting the body	Mali	Mamma Haidara Commemorative Library, Timbuktu 16°46′20″N 3°00′31″W	2017	
Tadkirat al gāfilin ‘anqubhihtilāf al- mu’minin/ Reminder to those who do not pay attention to the harms caused by the divergence between believers	Mali	Ahmed Baba Institute, Timbuktu 16°46′36″N 3°00′21″W	2017	
Maṣāliḥ al-Insān al-Mutaʿalliqat bi al-Adyānwa al-Abdān, The human being interests linked to the religions and the body	Mali, Nigeria	Mamma Haidara Commemorative Library, Timbuktu 16°46′20″N 3°00′31″W	2017	
Records of the French Occupation of Mauritius	Mauritius	Mauritius Archives, Port Louis 20°11′18″S 57°28′05″E	1997	
The Records of Indentured Immigration	Mauritius	National Archives Department 20°11′18″S 57°27′57″E; National Library 20°09′52″S 57°29′53″E; Mahatma Gandhi Institute 20°13′38″S 57°30′02″E	2015	
The Slave Trade and Slavery Records in Mauritius (1721-1892)	Mauritius	National Archives Department, Coromandel 20°11′16″S 57°27′57″E	2023	
The archival collections on the Bienheureux Père Jacques Désiré Laval - The Apostle of Mauritius	Mauritius	National Archives Department, Coromandel 20°11′16″S 57°27′57″E; National Library of Mauritius, Port Louis 20°09′52″S 57°30′03″E; Centre Père Laval, Sainte-Croix 20°08′53″S 57°31′47″E	2023	
Kitab al-ibar, wa diwan al-mobtadae wa al-khabar	Morocco	al-Qarawiyyin library, Fez 34°03′51″N 4°58′22″W	2011	
Manuscript of al- Zahrāwīsur	Morocco	Bibliothèque Nationale du Royaume du Maroc, Rabat 34°00′30″N 6°50′34″W	2017	
Al Orjoza fi teb by Ibn Toufail	Morocco	Archives du Maroc, Rabat 34°00′34″N 6°50′18″W	2025	
Census of slaves in Angola, Cape Verde and Mozambique determined by Portuguese decree of 12/14/1854	Mozambique, Cape Verde, Angola	Arquivo Nacional de Angola, Luanda 8°49′04″S 13°13′52″E; Arquivo Histórico de Moçambique, Maputo 25°57′55″S 32°34′17″E; National Archives Institute of Cape Verde, Praia 14°55′00″N 23°30′27″W	2025	
Letter Journals of Hendrik Witbooi	Namibia	National Archives of Namibia, Windhoek 22°33′26″S 17°05′11″E; Personal Archives of Dr. Klaus Goebel, Munich 48°08′10″N 11°33′44″E	2005	
Windhoek Declaration	Namibia	Namibia National Commission for UNESCO, Windhoek 22°33′55″S 17°05′03″E	2025	
Fonds of the "Afrique occidentale française" (AOF)	Senegal	National Archives of Senegal, Dakar 16°46′36″N 3°00′21″W	1997	
Collection of old postcards from French West Africa	Senegal	National Archives of Senegal, Dakar 16°46′36″N 3°00′21″W	2015	
William Ponty School Collection of Papers	Senegal	Institut Fondamental d’Afrique Noire Cheikh Anta Diop, Dakar 16°46′36″N 3°00′21″W	2015	
The Bleek collection	South Africa	University of Cape Town/South African Library, Cape Town 33°57′29″S 18°27′39″E	1997	
Archives of the Dutch East India Company	South Africa, Netherlands, India, Indonesia, Sri Lanka	Cape Town Archives Repository (office of the National Archives of South Africa) 33°55′53″S 18°25′26″E; Tamil Nadu Archives, Chennai 13°04′35″N 80°15′38″E; Department of National Archives of Sri Lanka, Colombo 6°54′24″N 79°51′53″E; Arsip Nasional Republik Indonesia (National Archives of Indonesia), Jakarta 6°16′43″S 106°49′08″E; Nationaal Archief (National Archives of the Netherlands), The Hague 52°04′52″N 4°19′35″E	2003	
Criminal Court Case No. 253/1963 (State Versus N. Mandela and Others)	South Africa	National Archives and Records Service of South Africa, Pretoria 25°44′11″S 28°12′21″E	2007	
Liberation Struggle Living Archive Collection	South Africa	Doxa Productions, Hout Bay 34°01′00″S 18°23′21″E	2007	
Archives of the CODESA (Convention For A Democratic South Africa) 1991 - 1992 and Archives of the Multi-Party Negotiating Process 1993	South Africa	National Archives and Records Service of South Africa, Pretoria 25°44′11″S 28°12′21″E	2013	
German Records of the National Archives	Tanzania	National Archives, Dar es Salaam 6°48′35″S 39°17′08″E	1997	
Collection of Arabic Manuscripts and Books	Tanzania	Zanzibar National Archives, Zanzibar 6°10′35″S 39°12′06″E	2003	
Privateering and the international relations of the Regency of Tunis in the 18th and 19th centuries	Tunisia	National Archives of Tunisia, Tunis 36°47′58″N 10°09′53″E	2011	
The Abolition of Slavery in Tunisia 1841-1846	Tunisia	National Archives of Tunisia, Tunis 36°47′58″N 10°09′53″E	2017	
The Music holdings in Baron Rodolphe d'Erlanger's archives (1910-1932)	Tunisia	Centre of Arab and Mediterranean Music, Sidi Bou Saïd 36°52′01″N 10°20′44″E	2023	
Nehanda and Kaguvi mediums’ judgement dockets (April 1897). Case between State versus Nehanda and Kaguvi spirit mediums leading to their execution.	Zimbabwe	National Archives of Zimbabwe, Harare 17°47′40″S 31°03′50″E	2015	

== See also ==
- UNESCO Memory of the World Register – Arab States (includes North Africa)

== Notes ==
Names and spellings provided are based on the official list released by the Memory of the World Programme.
