= Memory of the World Register in Arab States =

UNESCO initiative to preserve heritage

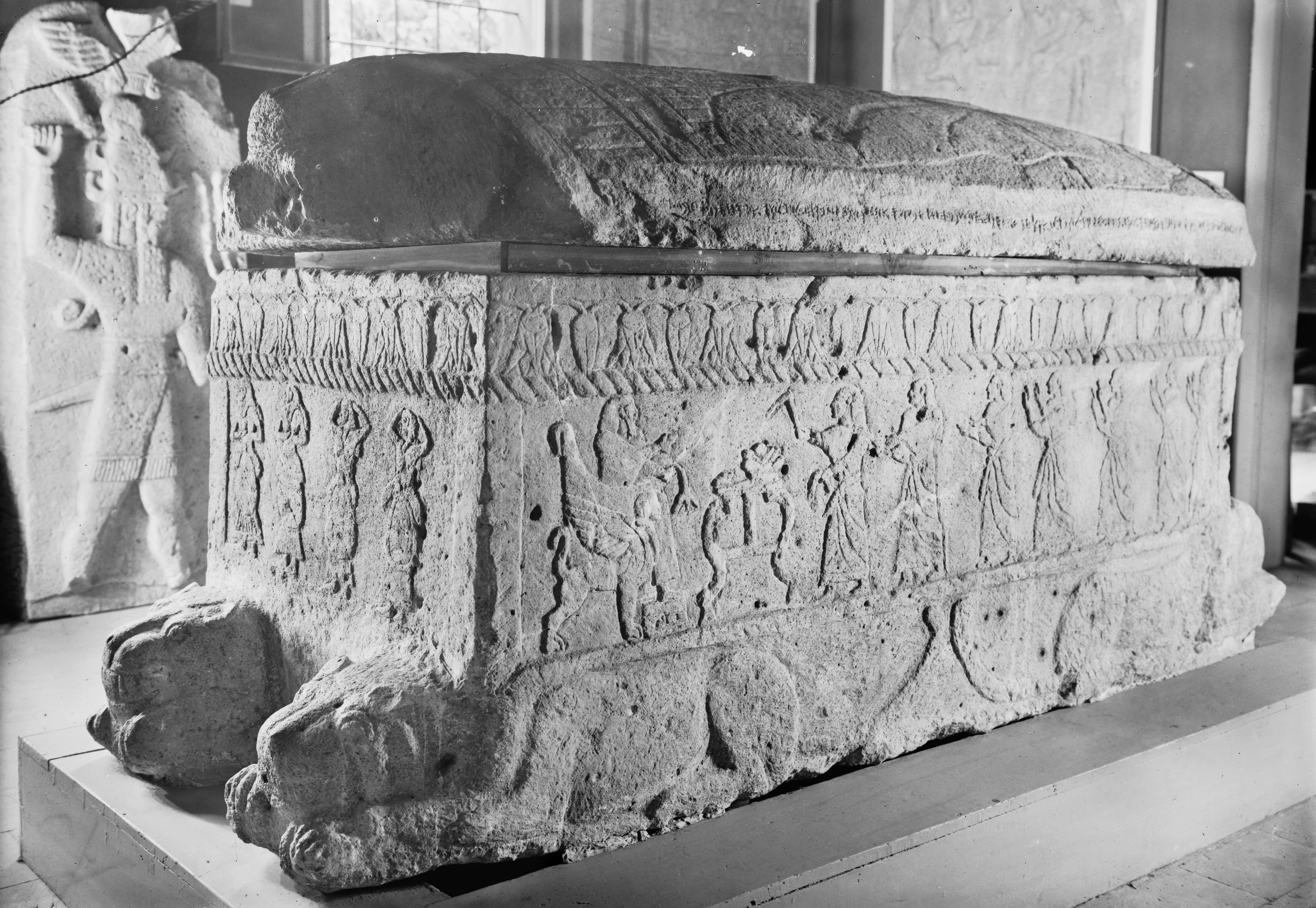
The sarcophagus of Ahiram in Lebanon contains the oldest known inscription of the Phoenician alphabet, the precursor to all alphabets in the world.

UNESCO's Memory of the World International Register lists documentary heritage – texts, audio-visual materials, library and archive holdings – that have been judged to be of global importance. The register brings that heritage to the attention of experts and the wider public, promoting the preservation, digitization, and dissemination of those materials.

The first inscriptions were added to the register in 1997. As of 2025, 570 pieces of documentary heritage had been included in the register. Of these, 24 were nominated or co-nominated by countries from the region of the Arab States. They include religious and secular manuscripts, texts carved on stone, maps, and historical archives.

== Image gallery ==
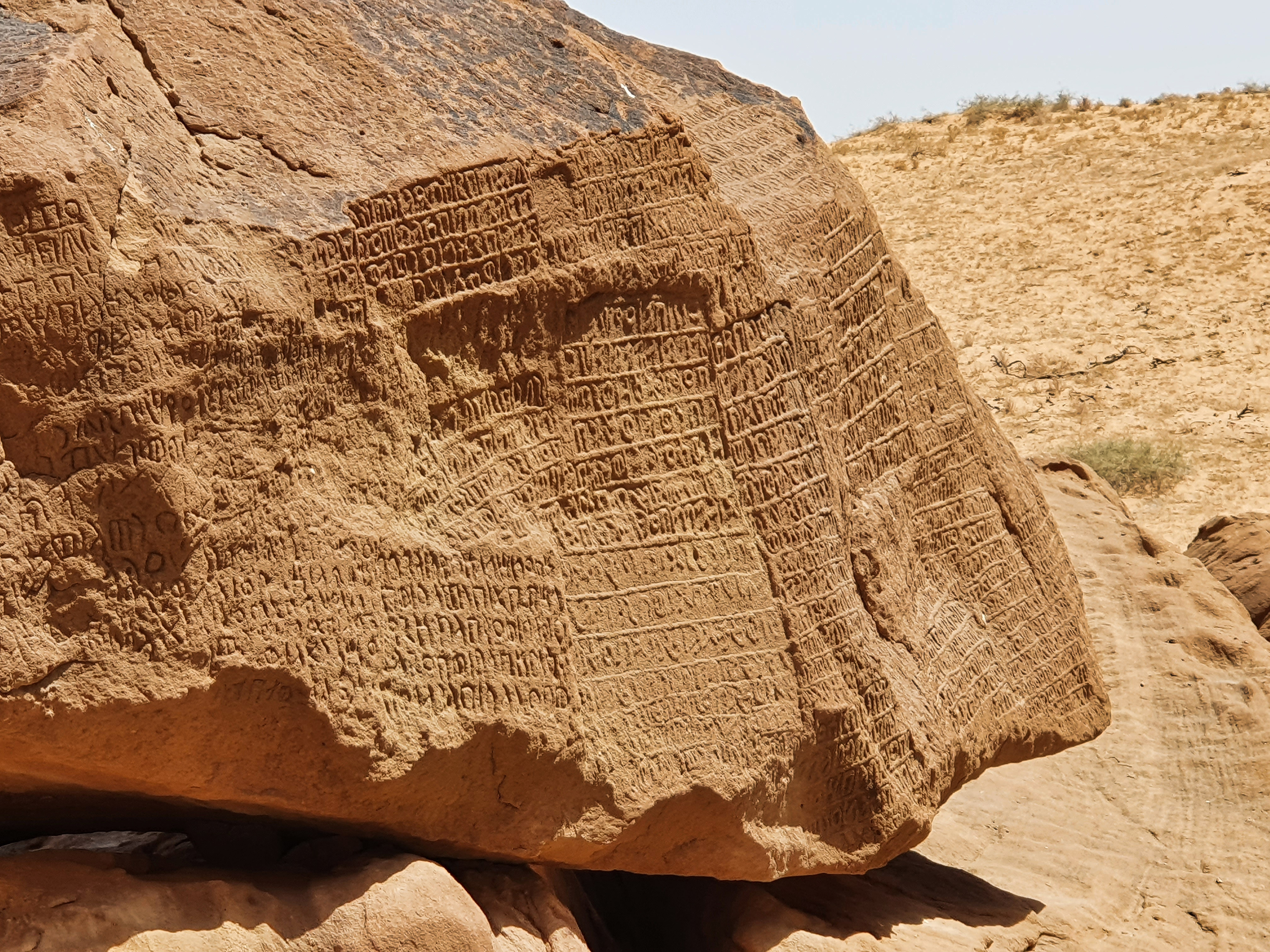
Rock inscriptions at Jabal Ikmah, Saudi Arabia

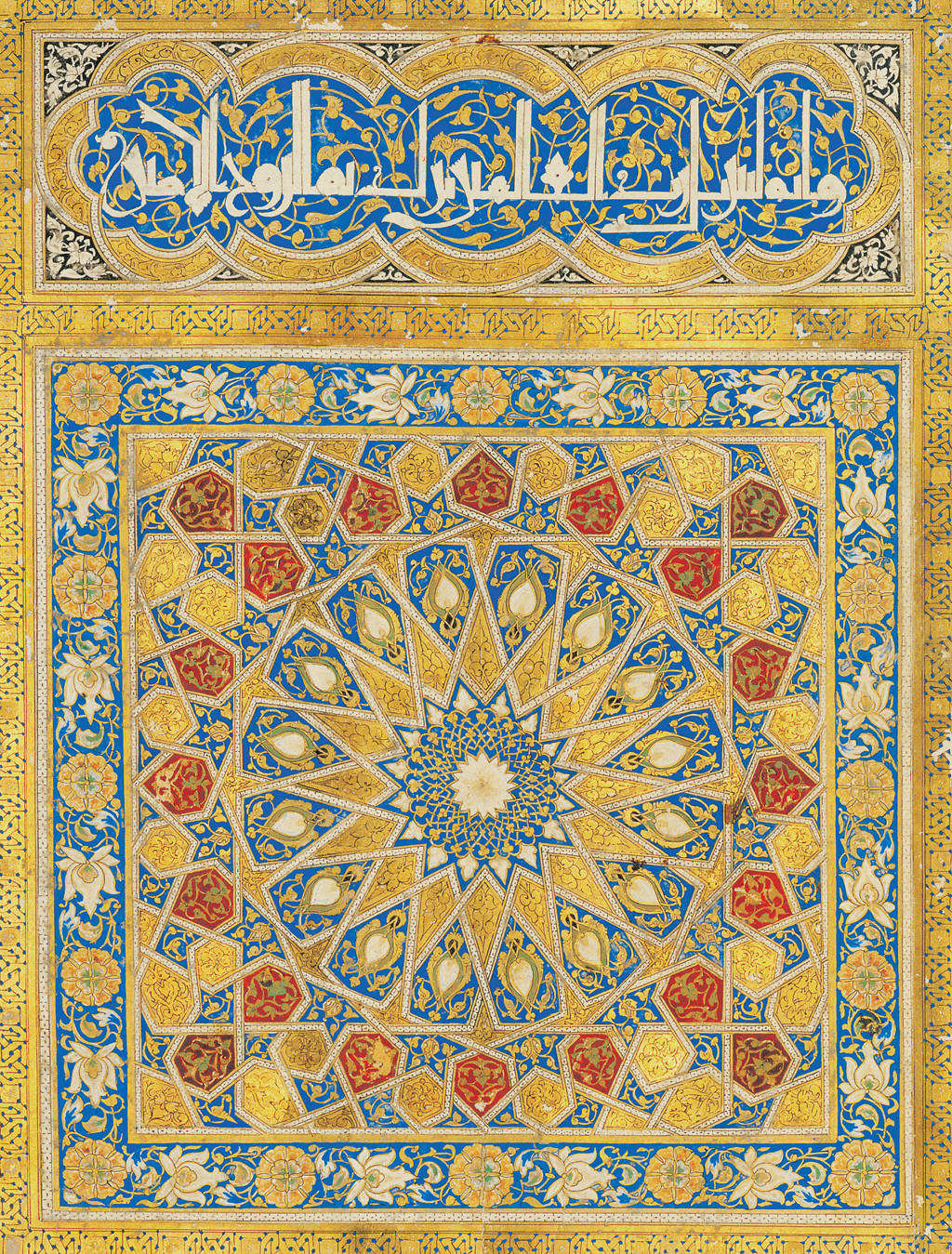
Frontispiece from a Mamluk Quran manuscript, Egyptian National Library

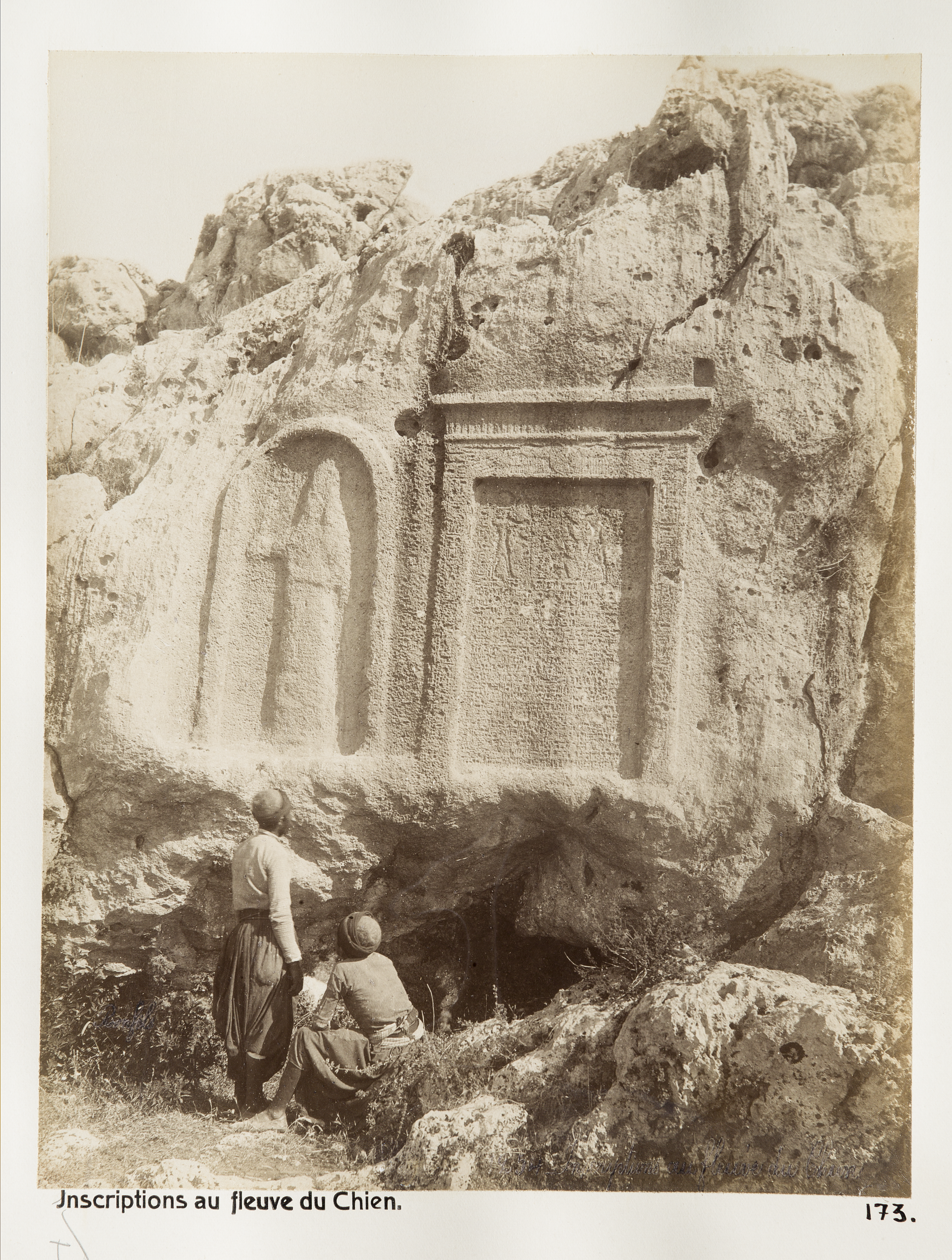
Commemorative stela of Nahr el-Kalb, Lebanon

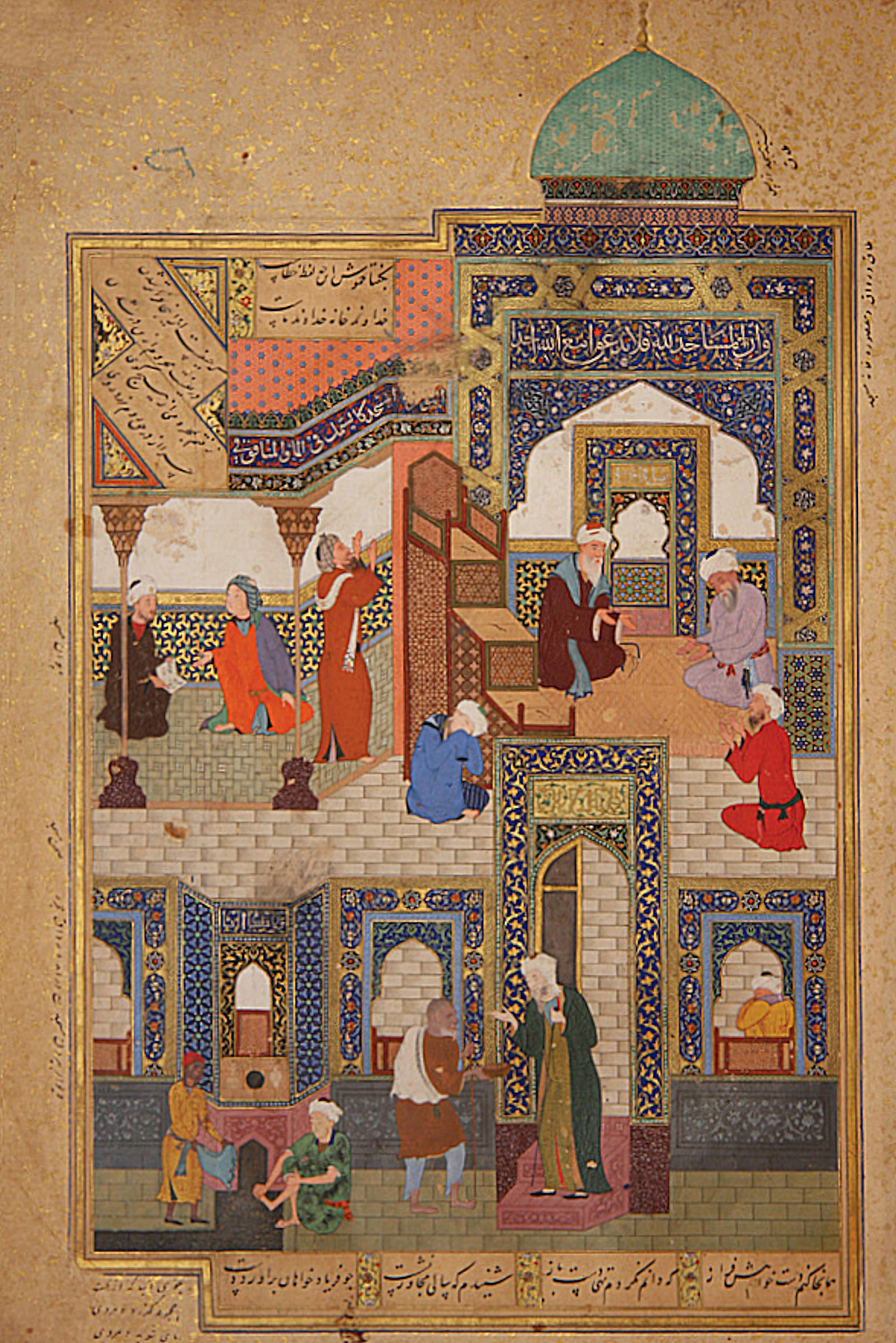
The Beggar at the Mosque from the Persian Illustrated and Illuminated Manuscripts of the Egyptian National Library

== List by country/territory ==
Documentary heritage^{[A]}	Country/Territory	Custodian(s), Location(s)	Year inscribed	Reference
Al-Mustamlah Min Kitab Al-Takmila	Algeria	National Library of Algeria, Algiers 36°44′55″N 3°04′19″E	2017	
First Summit Meeting of the Non-Aligned Movement Archives	Algeria, Egypt, India, Indonesia, Serbia	Egyptian National Library and Archives, Cairo 30°03′59″N 31°13′39″E; National Archives of India, Delhi 28°36′57″N 77°13′03″E; National Archives of the Republic of Indonesia, South Jakarta 6°16′43″S 106°49′11″E; Archives of Yugoslavia, Belgrade 44°47′21″N 20°26′31″E; National Archives of Algeria, Algiers 36°43′44″N 3°03′31″E	2023	
Kitab Al-Qanun fi Al-Tibb: the Book of Medical Laws (Book Four)	Algeria	National Library of Algeria, Algiers 36°44′55″N 3°04′19″E	2025	
Cuneiform Inscriptions of Dilmun Kings on Stone Vessels (c. 1700 BCE)	Bahrain	Bahrain Authority for Culture and Antiquities, Manama 26°14′26″N 50°35′54″E	2025	
Memory of the Suez Canal	Egypt	Egyptian Embassy, Paris 48°52′04″N 2°17′46″E	1997	
National Library of Egypt's Collection of Mamluk Qur'an Manuscripts	Egypt	National Archives of Egypt, Cairo 30°04′02″N 31°13′38″E	2013	
Deeds of Sultans and Princes	Egypt	National Archives of Egypt, Cairo 30°04′02″N 31°13′38″E	2005	
Persian Illustrated and Illuminated Manuscripts	Egypt	National Library and Archives of Egypt, Cairo 30°04′02″N 31°13′38″E	2007	
Itḫāf Al-Mahbṻb	Egypt	Al-Azhar Al-Sharif Library, Cairo 30°03′31″N 31°16′53″E	2025	
The Ikaros Inscription	Kuwait	National Council for Culture, Arts, and Letters, Kuwait City 29°22′21″N 47°58′57″E	2025	
The Phoenician Alphabet	Lebanon	National Museum, Beirut 33°52′42″N 35°30′54″E	2005	
Commemorative stela of Nahr el-Kalb, Mount Lebanon	Lebanon	Municipality of Zouk Mosbeh; Municipality of Dbayeh 33°58′15″N 35°43′37″E	2005	
Camocio Maps	Malta, Czech Republic	Faculty of Science, Charles University, Prague 50°04′08″N 14°25′28″E; Heritage Malta 35°53′34″N 14°31′29″E	2017	
Petrus de Caxaro’s Kantilena	Malta	National Archives of Malta, Rabat 35°52′55″N 14°24′05″E	2025	
Kitab al-ibar, wa diwan al-mobtadae wa al-khabar	Morocco	Bibliothèque al-Quaraouiyyine, Fez 34°03′51″N 4°58′22″W	2011	
Manuscript of al- Zahrāwīsur	Morocco	Bibliothèque Nationale du Royaume du Maroc, Rabat 34°00′30″N 6°50′34″W	2017	
Al Orjoza fi teb by Ibn Toufail	Morocco	Archives du Maroc, Rabat 34°00′34″N 6°50′18″W	2025	
Maden Al Asrar Fi Elm Al Behar Manuscript	Oman	Ministry of Heritage and Culture, Muscat 23°35′55″N 58°25′24″E	2017	
A’nuwniah Al kubra (An important Omani marine navigation manuscript)	Oman	Ministry of Culture, Sports and Youth of Oman 23°36′49″N 58°35′39″E	2025	
Earliest Islamic (Kufic) Inscription	Saudi Arabia	near Al-'Ula and Al Hijr archeological site NW Saudi Arabia 26°48′14″N 37°57′18″E	2003	
Arabian Chronicles in Stone: Jabal Ikmah	Saudi Arabia	Al-'Ula archeological site, NW Saudi Arabia 26°36′31″N 37°55′25″E	2023	
Privateering and the international relations of the Regency of Tunis in the 18th and 19th centuries	Tunisia	National Archives of Tunisia, Tunis 36°47′58″N 10°09′53″E	2011	
The Abolition of Slavery in Tunisia 1841-1846	Tunisia	National Archives of Tunisia, Tunis 36°47′58″N 10°09′53″E	2017	
The Music holdings in Baron Rodolphe d'Erlanger's archives (1910-1932)	Tunisia	Centre of Arab and Mediterranean Music, Sidi Bou Saïd 36°52′01″N 10°20′44″E	2023	

== Notes ==
Names and spellings provided are based on the official list released by the Memory of the World Programme.
