= AL24 News =

Algerian news channel

- Country: Algeria
- Broadcast area: Worldwide
- Headquarters: Algiers, Algeria

Programming
- Languages: Arabic; English; French

History
- Founded: 30 October 2021
- Launched: 1 November 2021

Links
- Website: al24news.com

AL24 News is an Algerian public international news channel broadcasting in Arabic, French and English since 1 November 2021.

== History ==
The concept for the channel was initially proposed by then-Minister of Communication Ammar Belhimer, to project Algerian soft power abroad. Prior to the channel's launch, Belhimer said that "the project to create an international television channel is a major focus of President Abdelmadjid Tebboune's program".

A ceremony marking the channel's official launch took place on 30 October 2021, on the 67th anniversary of the outbreak of the Algerian War, with broadcasts commencing on 1 November 2021 at midnight (WAT). Salim Aggar, a former director of the Algerian Cinematheque, was appointed as its inaugural director-general.

AL24 News and the Russian channel RT Arabic have signed a cooperation agreement on 7 December 2023. This agreement aims to facilitate the exchange of information and audiovisual programs between the two media outlets, as well as provide mutual assistance in the field of television broadcasting.

== Columnists ==
- Nohad Belkhadem:

-The host of the program "Hibdo Show": Belkhadem presents this popular weekly variety program on AL24 News. The program focuses on Algerian culture, tourism, and the achievements of the Algerian diaspora.

-Media Coverage: Her reporting covers a wide range of social and national topics, including: Health and Safety: Campaigns for AIDS awareness and warnings about the dangers of passive smoking. National Affairs: Reporting on the Algerian presidency's efforts to encourage the return of the diaspora. Tourism and Lifestyle: Reports on the digitalization of Algerian tourism and summer safety measures at beaches.

-Presidential Interviews: Belkhadem gained widespread professional recognition as one of the regular interviewers of Algerian President Abdelmadjid Tebboune during his periodic media appearances.

-Radio Experience: Before joining AL24 News, Belkhadem worked as a reporter for Algerian Radio (specifically Channel 3), where she covered a wide range of social and economic topics, including tourism, public health, and local consumer affairs.

- Nariman Zakagh:

-News anchor and TV presenter for AL24news, an international news channel based in Algeria. She has been with the network since at least 2022, starting as a trainee before becoming a full-time journalist and reporter.

-Current Roles: She currently serves as a news anchor and specialized TV presenter, notably hosting segments for "La Grande Émission".

-Education: Zekagh holds a Master’s degree in Communication and Journalism from the Ecole Nationale Supérieure de Journalisme et des Sciences de l'Information (ENSJSI), graduating in 2022 with a focus on media geopolitics.

-Skills: She is known for being trilingual (Arabic, French, and English) and is recognized as one of the top Algerian creators

- Karim Bouaziz:

-Analysis of International Issues: Bouaziz provided analyses of UN resolutions, such as his commentary on Security Council resolutions concerning the events in Gaza and Rafah.

-Coverage of Political Affairs: He contributed to reports on complex international crises, such as the migrant crisis and its impact on political relations in the United States.

-Issues of Diaspora Communities and Lobbying: In his media appearances, he discussed issues related to the Algerian diaspora and the lack of lobbying groups representing them.

== Content ==
According to the state-run Algeria Press Service, the channel intends to strengthen "Algeria's presence on the international media scene and the impact of its positions vis-à-vis regional and international causes". Officially, 60% of content is produced in Arabic, followed by 35% in French and 5% in English.

Programming includes rolling news, debates, talk shows, documentaries, and thematic magazines.

== Reception ==
A July 2022 assessment by Jeune Afrique said that results were "mixed" for AL24 News's audience. Notably, it "failed to distinguish itself with content that is fundamentally different from the many private or public television channels. With 500,000 subscribers and more than 300,000 likes on its Facebook page, it is clear that it has failed to capture the attention of Algerians."

The channel has been criticised by Moroccan pro-government media for its connections to the Algerian state.

== See also ==
- Echorouk News
- Ennahar TV
- Television in Algeria
