= National Library of Madagascar =

- Bibliothèque nationale de Madagascar
- 18.9152068461812°S 47.517286108991925°E
- Location: Antananarivo, Madagascar
- Type: National library
- Established: 1961

The National Library of Madagascar (Bibliothèque nationale de Madagascar) is the national library of Madagascar. It was established in 1961 and it is located in Antananarivo.

== See also ==
- National Archives of Madagascar
- List of national libraries

== Bibliography ==
- Marcel Lajeunesse, ed. (2008). "Madagascar". Les Bibliothèques nationales de la francophonie (PDF) (in French) (3rd ed.). Bibliothèque et Archives nationales du Québec. OCLC 401164333.
