= List of archives in Algeria =

This is list of archives in Algeria.

== Archives in Algeria ==
- Archives de la Wilaya d'Oran
- Centre Algerien de la Cinematographie
- Centre Nationale des Archives (Algeria)

== See also ==
- List of archives
- List of museums in Algeria
- Culture of Algeria

== Bibliography ==
- "الأرشيفي ودوره في تثمين الأرشيف التاريخي للفترة الاستعمارية الفرنسية للجزائر: دراسة ميدانية بمركز أرشيف ولاية قسنطينة" [Development of historical archives of the French colonial period of Algeria: case of the Constantine Province archives center]. Cybrarians Journal (in Arabic) (39). Cairo. 2015. ISSN 1687-2215.
