= National Library of Senegal =

National library, part of the National Archives of Senegal

Coordinates: 14.6633°N 17.4343°W

- Bibliothèque nationale du Sénégal
- Location: Dakar, Senegal
- Established: 1913

The National Library of Senegal (Bibliothèque nationale du Sénégal or Bibliothèque des Archives nationales du Sénégal) is located in Dakar, Senegal.

== History ==
As of 1993, "three libraries perform the functions of a national library" in Senegal: the library of the Archives Nationales (est. 1913), the library of the Institut Fondamental d'Afrique Noire (est. 1938), and the library of the Centre de Recherche et de Documentation (est. 1944). Legal deposit was established in 1976 per decree number 76-493.

== See also ==
- National Archives of Senegal
- Centre de Recherche et Documentation du Senegal
- List of national libraries

== Bibliography ==
- Marcel Lajeunesse, ed. (2008). "Senegal: Bibliothèque des Archives du Sénégal". Les Bibliothèques nationales de la francophonie (PDF) (in French) (3rd ed.). Bibliothèque et Archives nationales du Québec. OCLC 401164333.
- Maack, M.N. (1981). Libraries in Senegal: Continuity and Change in an Emerging Nation. American Library Association: Chicago, IL.
