= Tanzania National Archives =

Historical archives in Tanzania

Coordinates: 6.8095°S 39.2857°E

The Tanzania National Archives (est. 1962) are the national archives of Tanzania. The headquarters are located in Dar es Salaam on Vijibweni Street in Upanga. They contain more than 8,000 files dating back to German East Africa, files from British-administered Tanganyika Territory, and further records since the country's independence.

== History ==
The oldest holdings in the archive date from the time of German colonial rule. During World War I, German East Africa had been conquered by British troops. In 1920 a British officer discovered, amidst a mass of German-language documents, instructions from the last German governor from 1916, according to which the most important files of the German colonial government should be buried in Tabora and other places to prevent them from falling into the hands of the advancing British. This discovery led to negotiations between the British administration in Tanganyika Territory and the German government. In 1921 the latter agreed to send two representatives to assist in excavating the records. Since then, the recovered documents form the core of the German-language holdings of the Tanzania National Archives.

From 1950 onwards, the British government investigated whether a joint archive service could be set up for the then colonies and protectorates of Kenya, Uganda, Tanganyika and Zanzibar. V.W. Hiller, who was Chief Archivist of the then Central African Federation, was in charge of this investigation, but no further steps were taken. After historian Marcia Wright had examined the condition of the records, she submitted her report in November, 1962. It concluded that the records were threatened by ongoing destruction, as they were kept in a roofless warehouse.

By Presidential Decree No. 7 of December 1962, the National Archives became a division of the Ministry of National Culture and Youth of the newly independent government of Tanganyika. In June 1963 the ministry, supported by UNESCO, commissioned J. R. Ede, a professional archivist, to look after documents worthy of archiving. Ede also initiated steps to set up the National Archives as a government agency. The first director was Michael Cook. He initially endeavoured, under sometimes daring circumstances, to recover and secure files that were stored in the attics of provincial and district administrations across the country.

By Government Notice Number 289 of 1999, the archives were transferred from the Ministry of Education and Culture to the Public Service Management at the President's Office, and a Records and Archives Management Division was established the same year. The earlier National Archives Act No. 33 of 1965 was replaced by the Records and Archives Management Act. No.3 of 2002. This act stated the main functions of the division, such as efficient keeping of records by all public offices, transfer and preservation of public records of enduring value to the National Archives, public access and storing of every publication produced by the Parliament, government and higher courts of the country.

The Records and Archives Management Department has a division for records management and a second one for archives management. A third division is dedicated to a museum, archives and research relating to the "Founders of the Nation" Julius Nyerere and Abeid Karume.

=== Location ===
The archives were initially housed in the basement of a government building known as the Old Treasury, facing the harbour near Azania Front Lutheran Church. In October 1964, the archives moved to a former commercial building in the city centre. Finally in 1984, the National Archives were relocated to buildings specially built for this purpose at Upanga, Vijibweni Street No 7. The National Archives are comprised by their headquarters in Dar es Salaam and six regional branch offices located in Mbeya, Mwanza, Arusha, Dodoma, Tanga, and Singida.

== Records in the National Archives ==
The German-language holdings in the Tanzania National Archives are part of UNESCO's Memory of the World Programme.

=== The German-language holdings ===
The German-language holdings consist of a collection of more than 8,000 files from the administration of German East Africa for the period 1890–1918. Finding aids for these are available. UNESCO has recognized the importance of this collection by inscribing it in the Memory of the World international register since 1997.

The German-language holdings initially posed a problem for the archive, as there was initially no one in the archive administration who read German. Michael Cook therefore asked for help from West Germany. After initial difficulties, the German side showed an interest, first commissioning the historian Egmont Zechlin, then staff from the school of archives in Marburg.

This help in sorting and indexing the documents also served to maintain relations between West Germany and Tanzania, at least in the cultural field, since Tanzania had recognized the German Democratic Republic, and the Federal Republic had frozen diplomatic relations and development aid in accordance with the Hallstein Doctrine. Furthermore, part of the colonial records in West Germany had been lost during the World War II, and what was preserved was mostly in the possession of the State Archives of East Germany and was very difficult for researchers from the West to access. The Federal Archives therefore had a significant interest in filming the German-language holdings stored in the Tanzania National Archives.

In this context, the archivist and historian Eckhard Franz and others from the Marburg archives school worked twice over a longer period of time at the Tanzania National Archives in 1967 and 1969. They organized the holdings and made microfiche copies. Since then, further German historians have used the holdings and evaluated documents. The project was subsequently taken over by the German Federal Archives in 1976.

=== The other holdings ===
The Tanzania National Archives also contain

- over 30,000 files from the British administration (Chief Secretary's Office) from the period 1919 to 1960,
- archives from the former provincial, regional and district administrations. All of these documents are arranged in the National Archives according to provenance and original order. There are 12 finding aids for the files of the provincial administrations and 114 for the district documents.
- documents from Tanzanian ministries, authorities, regions, districts and semi-governmental organizations.
- church archives and private documents from the years 1885–1980.
- a small collection of private papers, e.g. from the Universities Mission to Central Africa (UMCA) and from individuals such as Shaaban Robert, Saadan Kandoro or Kanyama Chiume.
- Newspapers.
- Official gazettes from 1919 to the present.
- a collection of maps and plans from the German and British colonial period up to the period since independence.
- photographs from the German and British period and the period since independence.
- postage stamps 1963–2000.
- a library related to the history of Tanzania.

== See also ==
- Tanzania Library Services Board
- List of national archives
- Unesco Memory of the World Register – Africa

== Bibliography ==
- Michael Cook (2019). Meine Tätigkeit in Tansania. Ein Zeitzeugenbericht. In: Archivnachrichten aus Hessen 19/2, pp. 72–75. (in German)
- Philip Haas (2019). Deutsche Akten Afrikas. Erschließung und Verfilmung von Kolonialakten durch die Archivschule Marburg und das Bundesarchiv. In: Archivnachrichten aus Hessen 19/2, pp. 65–68. (in German)
- Marcia Wright (1965). "The Tanganyika Archives". American Archivist. 28 (4): 511–520. doi:10.17723/aarc.28.4.t6p7847l874586t4.
- Leander Schneider (2003). "Tanzania National Archives". History in Africa. 30: 447–454. doi:10.1017/S0361541300003326. JSTOR 3172100. S2CID 161858396.
