= National Archives of Egypt =

Egyptian government agency

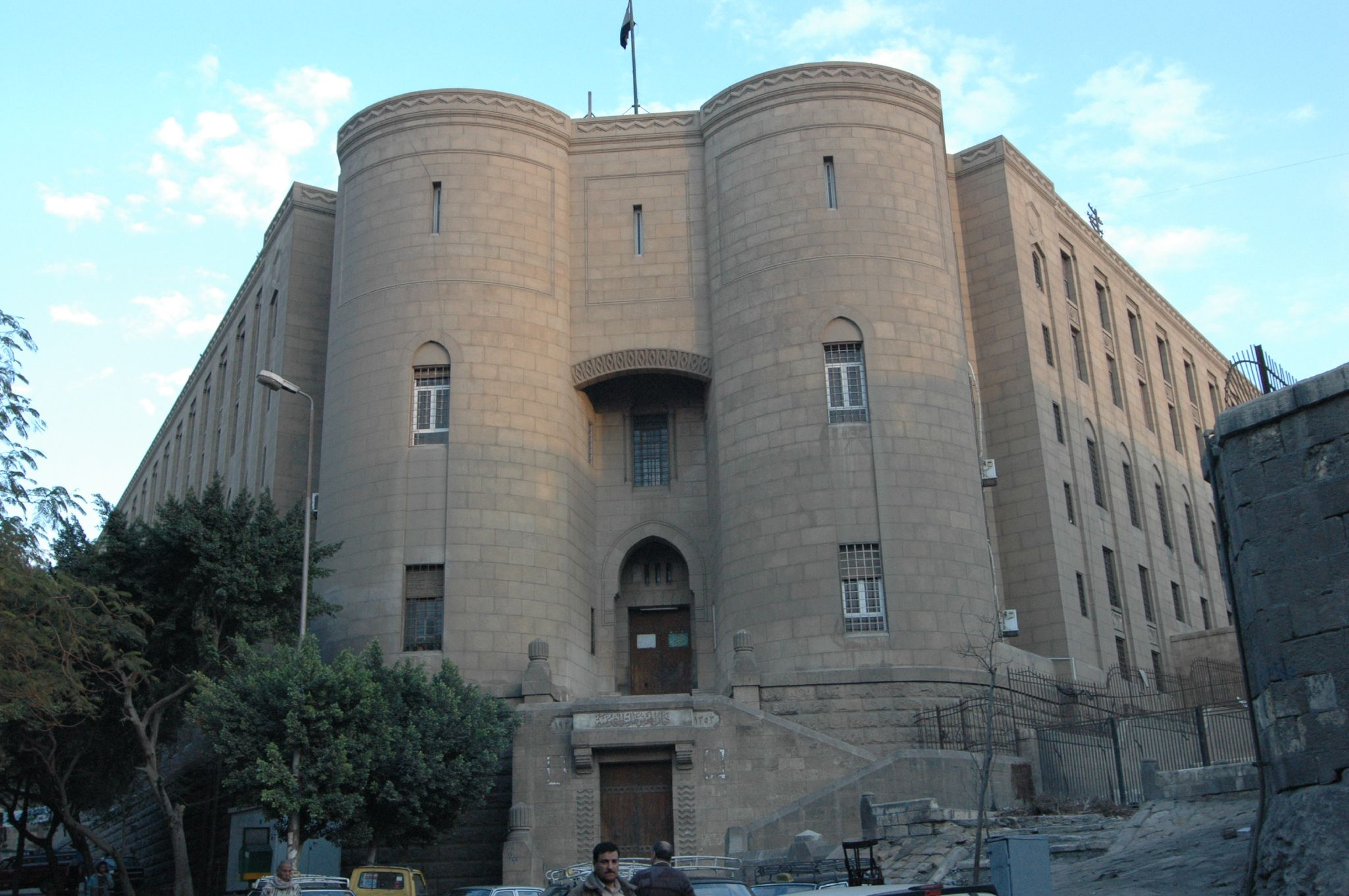

Agency overview
- Formed: 1828; 198 years ago
- Type: Government Agency
- Jurisdiction: Egyptian Government
- Headquarters: Cairo

The National Archives of Egypt is an Egyptian government agency, among the oldest in the world, founded in Cairo, Egypt, in 1828. It dates, therefore, to the 19th century when Mohammed Ali of Egypt constructed a place in the Cairo Citadel to preserve official records and named it Daftarkhana (House of Documentation).

The National Archives of France were established in 1794 and the Public Record Office, London, wasn't established until 1838, following the national archives of Austria, Hungary, Croatia, Switzerland, Netherlands, Poland, Mauritius, Finland, Norway, Indonesia, Argentina, and Uruguay. The main aim behind the construction of the National Archives of Egypt, was collecting written documentation of the state’s activities and maintaining it in one place; thus, it eventually turned to a storehouse of Egypt's national heritage. The first to head Daftarkhana was Ragheb Effendi; whereas, the first to set its internal rules of procedures was John, the expenditure clerk. The Egyptian House of Documentation (Daftarkhana) accumulated so many governmental documents after they were no longer needed that Mohammed Ali was forced to construct Archival Storehouse in governmental ministers and agencies in the capital as well as the provincial governorates.

== Development ==
The government called on a French expert, named Monsieur Rose’, to help it develop special legislation based on systems and bylaws used in the French Archives Nationales. The House of Documentation (Daftarkhana) continued to function under the system established by Mohammed Ali until Khedive Ismail came to power (1863–1879). He closed all the branches previously opened in the provincial governorates, and ordered that all the documents be stored in the original House of Documentation in the Citadel. During the reign of Abbas Helmi II (1892–1914), a new set of law consisting of 24 clauses was issued for the purpose of regulating the ways documents were to be delivered and received. Afterwards, the name of the archives was changed to the Public Records Office, while it remained housed at the Citadel. When King Fouad I came to the throne (1917–1936), some terms were changed: ‘Nezara’ became ‘Wezara’ (Ministry); moreover, the Public Records Office did not publish documents like other world archives. Henceforth, King Fouad entrusted a French orientalist named Jean Dény with the inspection and organization of the Turkish documents saved in the Public Records Office as a step towards rendering these documents accessible to researchers and historians.

== Historical records department ==
In 1932 an order was issued by King Fouad to construct “the Historical Records Department in Abdeen Palace. The order was based on a religious recommendation of some kind. The assigned task of this department, that came to be a modern national archive of Egypt, was indexing and sorting documents. The Department was also able to accomplish a number of tasks, some of which were:

1. Collecting the firmans (decrees) sent by the Ottoman Sultans to Egyptian Walis (viceroys), which numbered 1,046 and dated back to 1597 A.D. This collection of firmans (decrees) was photocopied and published in seven bound volumes by the Egyptian Survey Authority (ESA).
2. Analyzing and organizing the 900,000 foreign documents dating to the period of Ismail Pasha’s reign as well as summarizing and translating some of them into Arabic.
3. Making index cards for a huge number of Arabic and Turkish documents.

== National historical archive ==
After the Egyptian Revolution of 1952, the Historical Records Department in Abdeen Palace was viewed by the revolution's leaders as a storehouse of documents promoting the Mohammed Ali dynasty. Rewriting the history of that period was an urgent demand. A new “National Historical Archive” was established by law no. 356 of 1954, with the purpose of collecting and keeping documents from all periods. In 1969, it was transferred from Abdeen Palace, its first location, to the Citadel in Cairo. In 1990 it was moved to its current location in the Nile Corniche, Cairo. With the issuance of presidential decree no. 176 of 1993, a new independent authority was created that united the Book Organization and the National Archives and separated them from the Egyptian General Book Organization.

== Importance ==
Overall, the National Archives of Egypt is considered one of the most important Archives in the world, due to the huge number of archival resources it contains. In fact, its documents and manuscripts are a reflection of the key status that Egypt has held for so long in world history. It contains documents written in many languages: Arabic, Turkish, English, Italian, French and German as well as a few in Amharic. They cover almost a thousand years of history, from the Abbasid, Fatimid, Ayyubid, Mameluk, and Ottoman Empire eras up to modern times.

== See also ==
- Bibliotheca Alexandrina
- Egyptian National Library and Archives
