= Abdelouahed Mountassir =

Moroccan architect and urban planner

- Born: January 3, 1956 (age 70); Casablanca, Morocco
- Education: University of Lille
- Occupation: Architect
- Awards: Moroccan Architect of the Year, 2008
- Practice: AWM Architectes Urbanistes
- Buildings: National Library of the Kingdom of Morocco, future Ibn Sina University Hospital in Rabat
- Website: www.awmountassir.com

Abdelouahed Mountassir (born 3 January 1956 in Casablanca, Morocco) is a Moroccan architect and urban planner. He is mainly known for his designs of the National Library of the Kingdom of Morocco (2008), for the future Ibn Sina University Hospital in Rabat and for urban development projects in Rabat and Casablanca.

== Life and career ==
Mountassir studied architecture at the University of Lille, France, and graduated as architect with a government diploma (D.P.L.G.) in 1983. In his biography, he mentioned Cuban architect Ricardo Porro, whom he met at the school of architecture in Lille, as an important inspiration for his understanding of contemporary architecture. Before he became an architect, Mountassir was active as painter and participated in several exhibitions in Morocco and abroad. Back in Morocco, he worked as director and lecturer at the training centre for technical professions of the Ministry of the Interior.

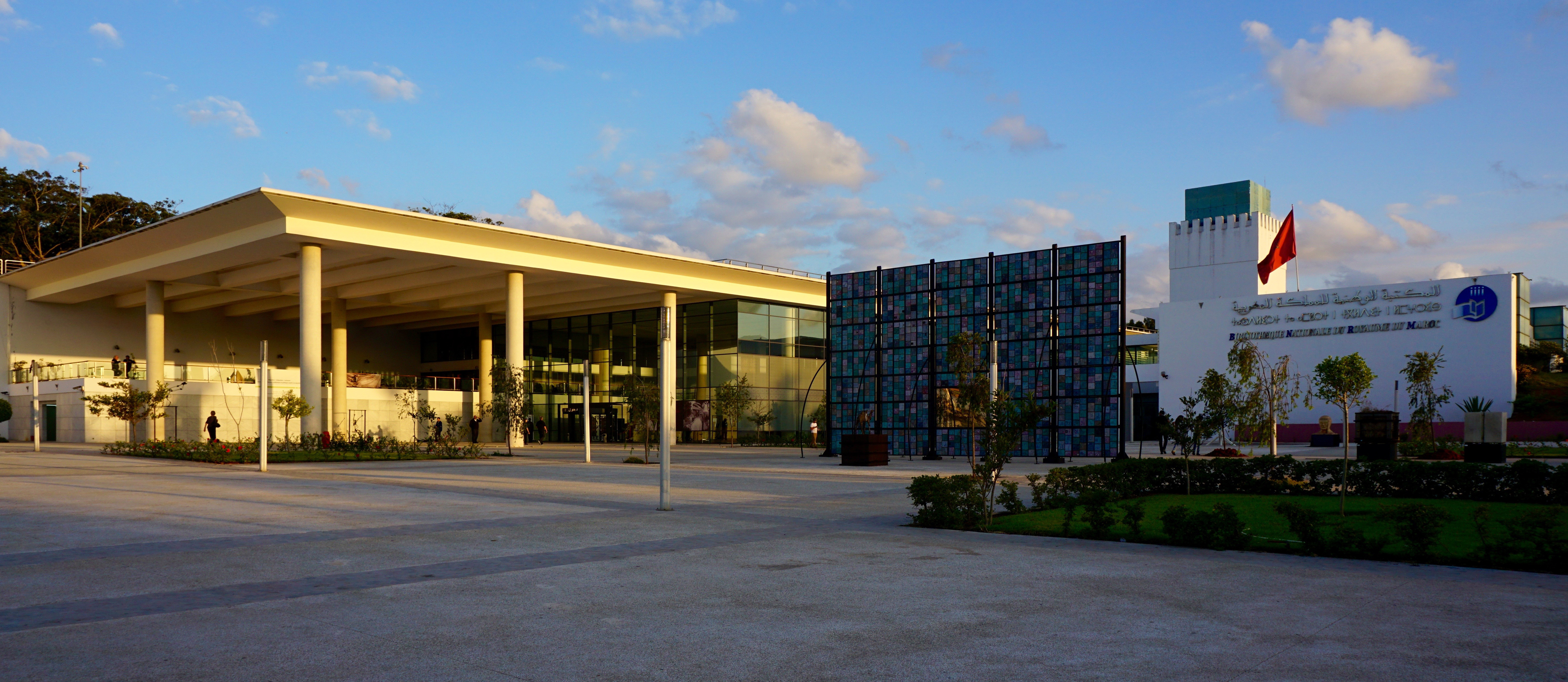
National Library of Morocco, designed by Abdelouahed Mountassir and Rachid Andaloussi

In 1983, he founded his first architectural practice AWM in Casablanca, that has since designed and built several private and public buildings in different Moroccan cities. One of these was the National Library of the Kingdom of Morocco in Rabat-Agdal, designed together with the Moroccan architect Rachid Andaloussi. It was inaugurated by King Mohammed VI on 15 October 2008.

In 2008, Mountassir was distinguished as "Architect of the Year" by the National Order of Architects of Morocco, and from 2014 to 2017, he served as president of the same professional organization. He was included in 2001 in the humanities project ArchNet by the Aga Khan Trust for Culture with his social housing project Nassim in Casablanca and has collaborated in projects with internationally renowned architects such as Norman Forster and Jean Nouvel.

Apart from public and private projects, Mountassir has designed buildings for hotels, railway stations and various educational institutions from kindergarten to primary and secondary schools as well as for a professional training centre. On 5 May 2022, the King of Morocco officially launched the construction of a new complex of modern buildings and medical departments for Ibn Sina University Hospital in Rabat. This future complex of 1000 beds and with a budget of approx. DH 6 billion (c. €537 million) is expected to take four years of construction and accompanying urban developments, including installations for environmental sustainability. AWMountassir studio is in charge of general design and planning, working in cooperation with French company AIA Life Designers, specialised in urban planning for medical installations.

In Mai 2022, the Université Internationale de Rabat (UIR) announced the construction of buildings for their new Faculty of Medicine, a Faculty of Public Health a School of Medical Engineering and an associated hospital. As for the new Ibn Sina University Hospital, AWMountassir studio and AIA Life Designers have been appointed for the design and planning. Both hospital complexes have been designed to include state-of-the-art medical, architectural and environmental features.

The projects of Mountassir's studio for urban planning as part of the Groupement Confluences include the Bab Al Bahr development with the Saphira Marina as part of the Bou Regreg Valley Development project in Salé, as well as the upscale building projects of the Casablanca Marina. Further, he has given interviews and published on the history of architecture in Morocco.

Apart from his activities as painter and architect, Mountassir has published two volumes of poems in Arabic and French. Due to his close relations to Germany, he was nominated Honorary Consul of Germany in Casablanca in 2010.

=== Selected architectural projects ===
- Centre Tertiaire Intermodal (CTI) Tanger Med), with Groupement Confluences and the studio of Jean Nouvel, 2006
- Technopolis, Rabat, 2007
- Bab Al Bahr urban development of the Bou Regreg Valley Development project, 2007
- Royal Air Maroc Academy, Casablanca, 2008
- Headquarters for the Istiqlal Party, Rabat, 2010
- Khouribga Media Centre, 2012
- New railway stations in Meknes, 2013 and Oujda, 2018
- New design for Rabat Central railway station, 2015
- future University Hospital Ibn Sina, Rabat, under construction
- future Faculties of Medicine and Public Health for Université Internationale de Rabat

== See also ==
- Moroccan architecture
