= Oscar Mac Carthy =

French explorer and librarian (1815–1894)

- Born: Oscar Louis Alfred Mac Carthy; 2 July 1815; Paris, France
- Died: 23 December 1894 (aged 79); Algiers, Algeria

Oscar Mac Carthy (2 July 1815 – 23 December 1894) was a French explorer, geographer, archaeologist, librarian, and expert on the Maghreb.

== Early life and family ==
Oscar Louis Alfred Mac Carthy was born in Paris on 2 July 1815. His father was John MacCarthy also known as Jack or Jacque, an Irish immigrant from Cork who had come to France to enlist in the Napoleonic army. His father led the defence of Laghy and the castle at Compiegne, and fought at Waterloo. He was also one of the founders of the Société de Géographie.

== Career ==
Mac Carthy worked for his father as an informal apprentice, collecting data and statistics for geographical publications. By 1830, he had been awarded three medals and a prize of 1000 francs for his regional statistical studies of Württemberg and Brazil. He left Paris in 1848 for Algeria. He spent two years preparing physically and mentally for the exploration he wished to undertake, learning Berber and Arabic in this time. He spent the next 14 years exploring and surveying the Maghreb and published his findings. He had planned to visit Timbuktu, and had permission to enter, by traversing the desert north to south but called off the expedition in 1859 as he deemed it too dangerous. He settled in Algiers in 1863, where he wrote, published and produced maps of the desert. A fervent colonial imperialist, he drew up maps proposing railway lines across the desert, work which was used by French proponents of a north African railway.

In 1869 he was appointed librarian of the Algiers Library and Museum. Among the many people who sought out his extensive knowledge of the Sahara was Charles de Foucauld, whom Mac Carthy tutored and of whom he became a close acquaintance. Foucauld dedicated his book, Reconnaissance au Maroc, to Mac Carthy. He was a founding member of the Société de géographie d'Alger, Société de sciences physiques d'Alger and Société historique algérienne.

Mac Carthy retired from the Library in 1891. He died in Algiers in 1894.

== Publications ==
- Algeria Romana (Paris, 1858)
- Geographique physique (Paris, 1859)
