= National Archives of Senegal =

Archives Nationales du Sénégal
- Interactive map of Archives Nationales du Sénégal
- 14.682910052004214°N 17.43851740240751°W
- Alternative name: National Archives of Senegal
- Location: Dakar, Senegal
- Website: https://askanwinfos.com/

The National Archives of Senegal (Archives Nationales du Sénégal) is headquartered in Dakar, in the Central Park building on Avenue Malick Sy. It was first called Archives Nationales in 1962, but the collection existed since 1913 as the archives of the colonial French West Africa administration. It moved from Saint-Louis to Dakar after 1958.

The archives hold two collections inscribed by UNESCO on the Memory of the World international register. The fonds of the "Afrique occidentale française", inscribed in 1997, contain extensive documentation of the art and culture of French West Africa. A collection of 1,515 postcards from the early 20th century was added to the register in 2015.

== Archivists ==
Archivists have included:

- Claude Faure (1911-1920)
- Prosper Alquier (1921-1922)
- Médoune Mbaye (1922-1936)
- André Villard (1936-1942)
- Marguerite Verdat (1945-1948)
- Jacques Charpy (1951-1958)
- Jean-François Maurel (1958-1959)
- Saliou Mbaye (1976-2005)
- Babacar Ndiaye, circa 2010-2011?
- Fatoumata Cissé Diarra, circa 2013?-present

== See also ==
- Unesco Memory of the World Register – Africa
- Bibliothèque des Archives nationales du Sénégal
- History of Senegal

== Bibliography ==
- Saliou Mbaye (1990). Guide des archives de l'Afrique occidentale française (in French). Dakar. OCLC 491084474. (Includes information about the National Archives of Senegal)
- Saliou Mbaye (1990). "Oral Records in Senegal". American Archivist. 53 (4): 566–574. doi:10.17723/aarc.53.4.pu7105854h265711. (Includes information about the National Archives of Senegal)
- Jacques Charpy (2010). "Les archivistes de l'AOF face à leur temps". Outre-mers (in French). 97 (368): 293–309. doi:10.3406/outre.2010.4507 – via Persee.fr.
- Ramatoulaye Fofana (2003), Etudes, recherche et conservation du patrimoine au Senegal: la Direction des Archives nationales, la bibliotheque de l'Institut Fondamental d'Afrique Noire et la bibliotheque de l'Universite Cheikh Anta Diop de Dakar (PDF) (in French), France: Ecole Nationale Superieure des Sciences de l'information et des Bibliotheques
