= Mahatma Gandhi Institute (Mauritius) =

Mahatma Gandhi Institute (MGI)

Location
- Gentilly Road; Moka; Mauritius
- Coordinates: 20.2272°S 57.5032°E

Information
- School type: Public
- Founded: 1970; 56 years ago

The Mahatma Gandhi Institute (commonly known as MGI), located in Moka on the island of Mauritius, is an educational institution that provides secondary, tertiary and pre-vocational education. The MGI is equally best known for its tradition of promoting and facilitating the research and preservation of cultural heritage and arts.

== History ==
The inspiration behind the creation of the MGI began in December 1969. Mon Desert Alma Limited, the company which owned the Sugar Estate and the lands nearby in Moka, donated a large area of land of 31 arpents. The institute was eventually founded in 1970 through a joint venture between the governments of Mauritius and India. The foundation stone was laid by Prime Minister of India Indira Gandhi on 3 June 1970. Soon afterwards the Legislative Assembly approved the MGI Act on 23 December 1970. It was inaugurated on 9 October 1976 by Seewoosagur Ramgoolam and Indira Gandhi, the then Prime Ministers of Mauritius and India respectively. The institutional compound eventually went on to have a secondary school on site, two auditoriums, a swimming pool, a vast playground, and various institutions for tertiary education. The Mahatma Gandhi Institute Act No. 1970 was later superseded by the MGI Act No.11 of 1982 and MGI Amended Act No. 47 of 2002.

== Education ==
As a whole, the MGI system is composed of various institutions that endeavour to provide quality education to a variety of students.

=== Tertiary education ===
At tertiary level there are 5 schools which operate:

- School of Indian Studies
- School of Performing Arts
- School of Fine Arts
- School of Mauritian & Area Studies
- School of Indological Studies

=== Secondary education ===
The MGI also runs a network of 6 secondary schools located in various regions of the country. They are as follows:

- Mahatma Gandhi Institute Secondary School (Moka)
- Mahatma Gandhi Secondary School (Moka)
- Mahatma Gandhi Secondary School (Flacq)
- Mahatma Gandhi Secondary School (Solferino)
- Mahatma Gandhi Secondary School (Nouvelle France)
- Rabindranath Tagore Secondary School (Ilot).

== Pre-vocational education ==
The Gandhian Basic School (located at Moka) specializes in pre-vocational education based on Gandhian principles.

== Cultural archives ==
The MGI has among its archives the records of those girmityas (Indian indentured labourers) sent to Mauritius under British colonial rule between 1842 and 1910. In 2015, these were inscribed in the UNESCO Memory of the World Register as being of great historical importance, particularly to the history of Mauritians of Indian origin. The records were originally transferred to the National Archives of Mauritius following a cultural agreement with the government of India in 1973, to be moved to the MGI once construction was complete. The newly-built MGI took possession in 1978 and has maintained them since.

These archives are accessible by researchers and descendants of these immigrant labourers.

== Other facilities ==
Other components of the MGI include a specialised Library of Languages and Culture, Folk Museum of Indian Immigration, Art Gallery, Language Resource Centre, multi-lingual Printing Press, Auditorium and Subramania Bharati Lecture Theatre.

== See also ==
- List of secondary schools in Mauritius
- Education in Mauritius
