= Arquivo Histórico Nacional (Angola) =

Angolan national historical archives organization

- Interactive map of Arquivo Histórico Nacional
- 8°49′1.82″S 13°13′54.59″E
- Location: R. Pedro Félix Machado 49, Luanda, Angola
- Type: National

The Arquivo Histórico Nacional is the national archive of Angola. Overseen by the Ministry of Culture, it is headquartered in the city of Luanda on Rua Pedro Felix Machado. As of 2016 a new archives building was under construction in Camama. The Arquivo Histórico Nacional originated in the Centro Nacional de Documentação e Investigação Histórica.

The archive is one of the institutions that hold the Ndembu Archives, which are listed on UNESCO's Memory of the World International Register. A set of slave registration books from 1856 to 1875 formed part of another set of heritage also inscribed on the register.

== Directors ==
- Rosa Cruz e Silva, circa 1997
- Francisco Alexandre, deputy director, circa 2013
- Alexandra Aparício, circa 2017
- Constança Ferreira de Ceita, since 10 April 2023

== See also ==
- Unesco Memory of the World Register – Africa
- National Library of Angola
- List of national archives

== Bibliography ==
- Republica Popular de Angola: Centro Nacional de Documentação Histórica (PDF) (in Portuguese), Paris: Unesco, 1981
- "Angola: Arquivo histórico nacional prepara novas instalações" [National Historical Archive Prepares New Facilities], Angop.ao (in Portuguese), Angola Press News Agency, 19 April 2017
- "Aprovada a Lei dos Arquivos" [Archives Law Approved], Jornal de Angola (in Portuguese), Luanda, 20 April 2017, archived from the original on 24 June 2020
