= National Archives of Madagascar =

The National Archives of Madagascar are the national archives of Madagascar. It holds 30,000 volumes.

The archive holds the Royal Archives (1824–1897) which have been listed by UNESCO on the Memory of the World International Register since 2009.

== See also ==
- Unesco Memory of the World Register – Africa
- National Library of Madagascar
- List of national archives
