= Amin Zaoui =

Algerian novelist

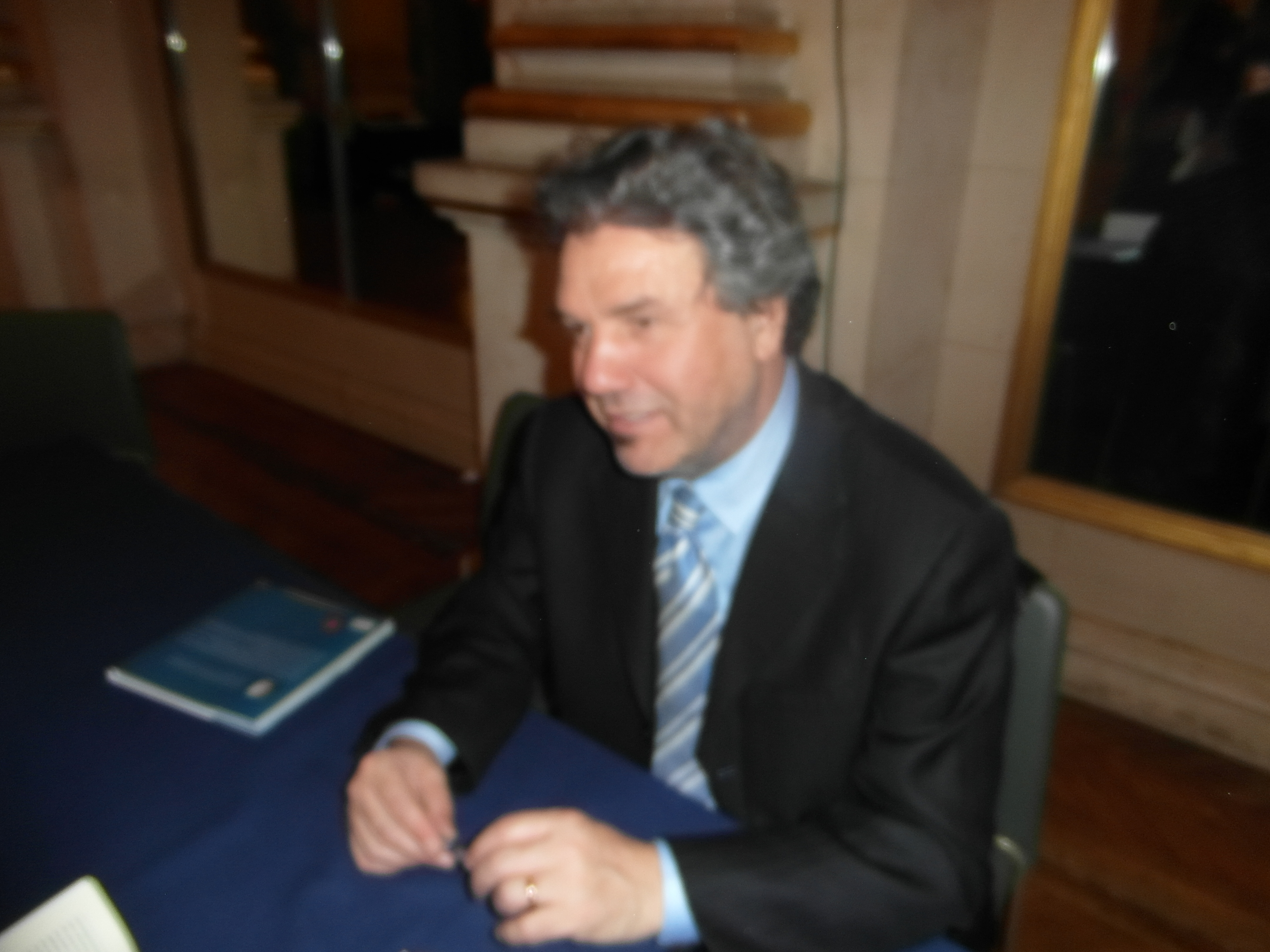
- Amin Zaoui (2014, Paris)
- Born: November 25, 1956 (age 69); Bab El Assa, Algeria
- Writing career
- Language: French and Arabic

Amin Zaoui (born 25 November 1956) is an Algerian novelist. He was born in Bab el Assa in Tlemcen province and studied at the University of Oran, obtaining a PhD in comparative literature. He moved to France during the Algerian civil war, but returned home in 1999. He has served as the Director General of the National Library of Algeria, and currently teaches comparative literature at the Central Algerian University.

Zaoui is a bilingual writer, and has published novels in both French and Arabic. His work has been translated into a dozen languages. Zaoui's French novel Festin de Mensonges has been translated into English by Frank Wynne. In 2012, his Arabic novel The Goatherd was nominated for the Arabic Booker Prize. His Arabic novel Siesta Dream was shortlisted for the 2026 International Prize for Arabic Fiction.

He has also translated French novels by Mohamed Dib and Yasmina Khadra into Arabic.

== Selected works ==
=== Arabic novels ===
- The Neighing of the Body (1985)
- The Tremor (1999)
- Satan's Road (2009)
- The Goatherd (2012) (nominated for the Arabic Booker Prize)

=== French novels ===
- La Soumission (1998)
- Haras de Femmes (2001)
- Festin de Mensonges (2007) (English translation: Banquet of Lies by Frank Wynne)
- La Chambre de la Vierge Impure (2009)
- Le miel de la sieste (2014)
- L'enfant de l'oeuf (2017)
