= National Library of Mauritius =

- 20.164466519428974°S 57.500869193670084°E
- Location: Port Louis, Mauritius
- Type: national library
- Established: 2000
- Reference to legal mandate: National Library Act, 1996 (Act No 32)

Collection
- Legal deposit: Yes

Other information
- Website: http://www.national-library.mu/

The National Library of the Republic of Mauritius is the national library of Mauritius. It has been entrusted by law as the national institution responsible for collecting, bibliographically recording, preserving and making available the nation's collective memory, and also provides information on practically all branches of knowledge, and functions as a center of coordination, planning and stimulation of the country's library system.

The institution was established by the Government under the National Library Act, 1996 (Act No. 32) as a body corporate, under the Ministry of Arts and Culture. The National Library of the Republic of Mauritius was officially opened to the public in January 2000.

== Vision ==
The National Archives and National Library of Mauritius are currently located in two different sites, at Coromandel and at the Fon Sin Building in Port-Louis, respectively. A new building, currently in construction in Moka will house both institutions. https://worldarchitecture.org/architecture-projects/hfnzn/national-archives-26-national-library-project-pages.html

== Vision ==
The National Library of the Republic of Mauritius aims to be a top class library in the provision of information services to the nation, thus contributing to its development.

== Mission statement ==
The National Library would provide equal access to information to all Mauritian nationals, thus leveling educational opportunities and deepening the democratization process. The objectives of the National Library are to promote and encourage the use of library materials; to acquire new library materials generally, and, in particular, materials relating to Mauritius; to lend library materials to the public; to participate in planning library services in Mauritius; to promote research in library fields and provide assistance in information handling techniques; to act as the national bibliographic center and maintain the national bibliography; to act as an organizing agency for national and international lending and exchange of library materials; and to initiate and promote cooperation between the library and other libraries, both at national and international levels.

== Role of the National Library of Mauritius ==
The main role of the National Library of Mauritius is to build a comprehensive collection of our national heritage by collecting, receiving and preserving all publications and productions, printed and produced in Mauritius for present and future generations. The main source of acquisition is by means of the legal deposit system as per the National Library Act 1996 which stipulates that every printer in Mauritius is required to deposit, free of charge, with the Director of the National Library six copies of each publication, be it a book, periodical, report, newspaper or any other printed document. The same rule applies to all the producers in Mauritius who have to deposit six copies of any non-print materials produced. To ensure that access is given to the most comprehensive collection of Mauritiana materials, the National Library has to acquire all print and non-print materials published and printed abroad, whose subject matter is related to Mauritius. The National Library is also responsible to build a collection of foreign reference materials on different subjects of interest for the benefit of the Mauritian public at large. As an apex institution in the field of information in Mauritius, the National Library functions as a central institution for coordination, planning and development of the entire library system of Mauritius.

== Holdings ==
The National Library's Mauritius collection consists of materials in various formats such as: written or graphic records, typescripts, books, newspapers, periodicals, music scores, photographs, maps, drawings, and non-print materials such as films, filmstrips, audiovisual items including tapes, discs and reproductions relating to any subject and produced in Mauritius or relating to Mauritius and produced overseas. The Library's holdings totaled 510,000 as of 2014–15. Subject coverage includes: agriculture, architecture, biography, computer science, economics, geography, handicraft, history, languages, literature, politics, pure and applied sciences, religion and so on. Our holdings also comprise rare documents namely bluebooks, almanacs, administrative reports, National Assembly debates, manuscripts, theses/dissertations, government gazettes, newspapers, and other documents dating back to 1777.

== See also ==
- National Archives of Mauritius
