= National Archives of Mauritius =

National archives of the Republic of Mauritius

Coordinates: 20.1884°S 57.4682°E

The National Archives of Mauritius are located in Coromandel, Mauritius. The archives were officially established in 1815, one of the earliest such institutions established in the Southern Hemisphere.

The national archives hold (at least parts of) four inscriptions on UNESCO's Memory of the World International Register: the Slave Trade and Slavery Records in Mauritius (1721–1892), Records of the French Occupation of Mauritius, the archival collections on the blessed Fr. Jacques Désiré Laval and the Records of Indentured Immigration.

== See also ==
- List of national archives
- National Library of Mauritius
