= Centre Algerien de la Cinematographie =

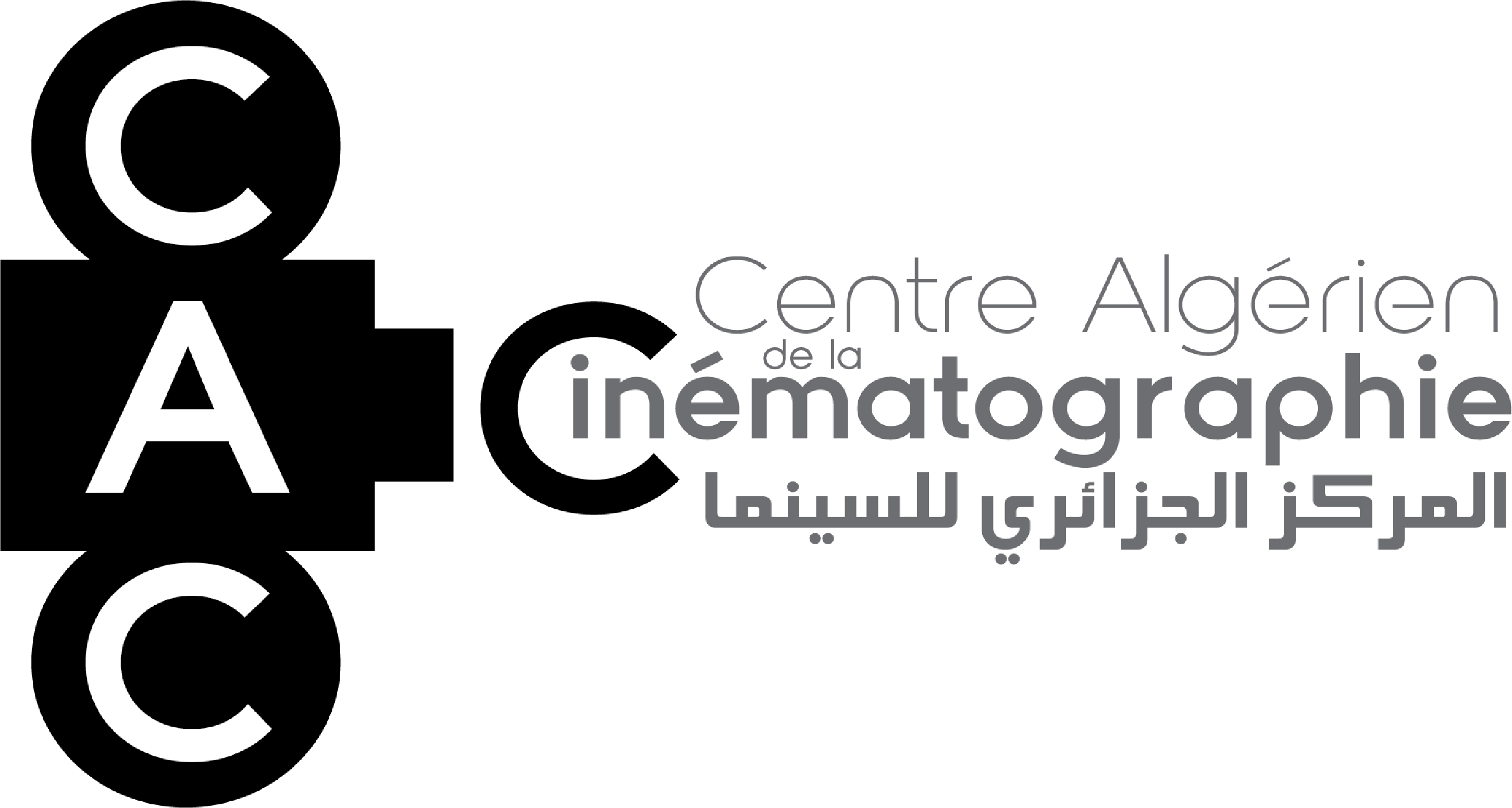
- Headquarters: Algiers

The Centre Algerien de la Cinematographie is a film archive in Algeria.

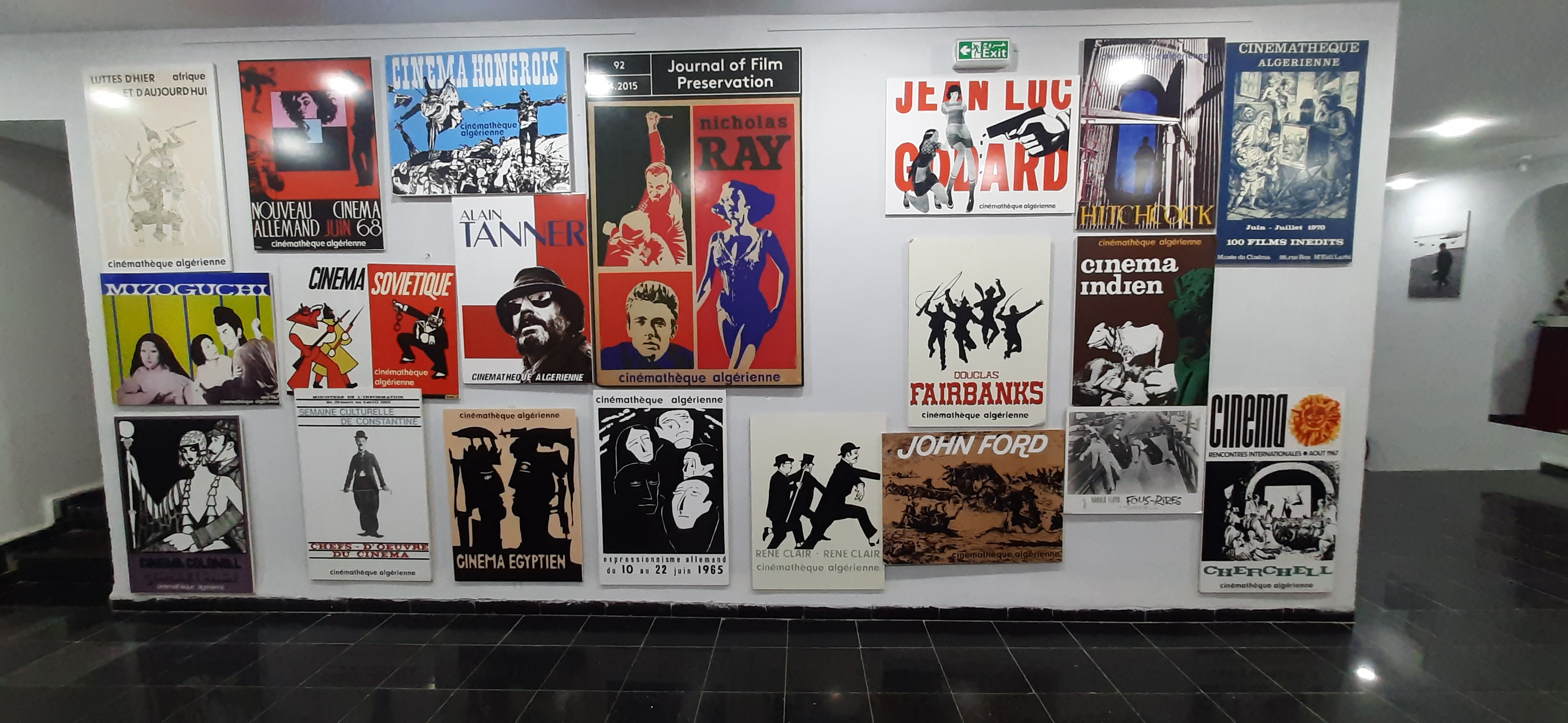
The lobby of the Cinémathèque d'Alger

== See also ==
- List of archives in Algeria
- List of film archives
- Cinema of Algeria
