= Louis-Adrien Berbrugger =

French archaeologist

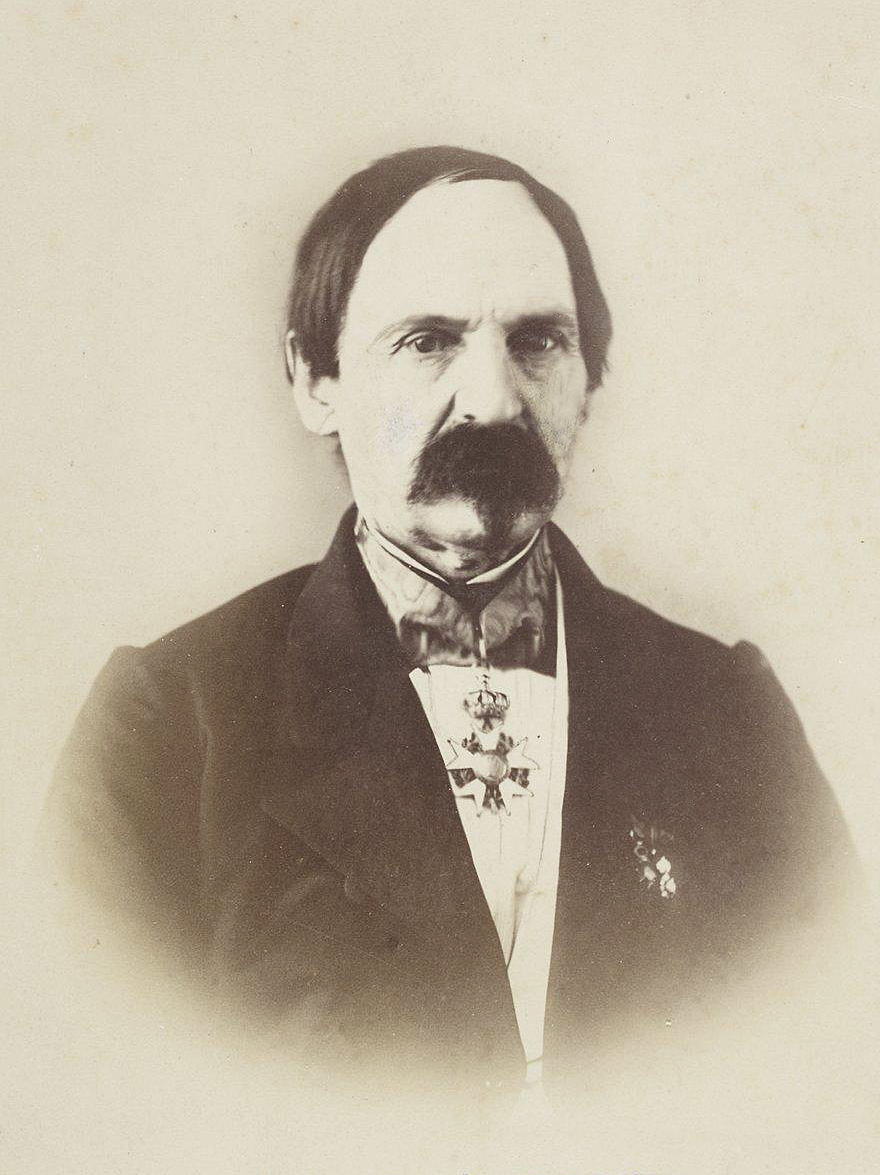
Louis-Adrien Berbrugger

Louis-Adrien Berbrugger (May 11, 1801 – July 2, 1869) was a French archeologist and philologist.

Berbrugger was born in Paris. He was an Arabist, with a Muslim wife, who set up the National Library in Algiers.

== Honors and accomplishments ==
He died in Algiers. His memorial lists his honors and accomplishments (in French):

- Curator of the library and museum of Algiers
- President of the Algerian Historical Society
- Member of the general council of the province of Algiers
- Colonel of the Algerian militia
- Commander of the French Legion of Honor
- Commander of the Order of Nichan Iftikhar
- Knight of the Order of St. Gregory the Great

== Selected writings ==
- Nouveau dictionnaire de poche français-espagnol et espagnol-français, (1829) – New French-Spanish and Spanish-French pocket dictionary.
- Exploration scientifique de l'Algérie pendant les années 1840, 1841, 1842, (1847) – Scientific exploration of Algeria from 1840 to 1842.
- Les époques militaires de la Grande Kabilie, (1857) – The military eras of the Great Kabylia.
- Le Pégnon d'Alger, ou, Les origines du gouvernement Turc en Algérie, (1860) – The Peñón of Algiers, or, the origins of the Turkish government in Algeria
- Le tombeau de la chrétienne, mausolée des rois mauritaniens de la dernière dynastie, (1867) – The Christian tomb at the Royal Mausoleum of Mauretania of the last dynasty.
