= National Library of Algeria =

Algerian national library

National Library of Algeria المكتبة الوطنيّة الجزائريّة
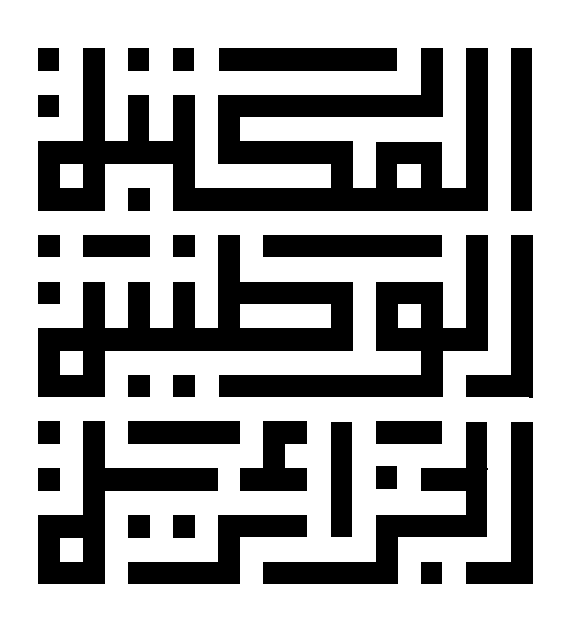

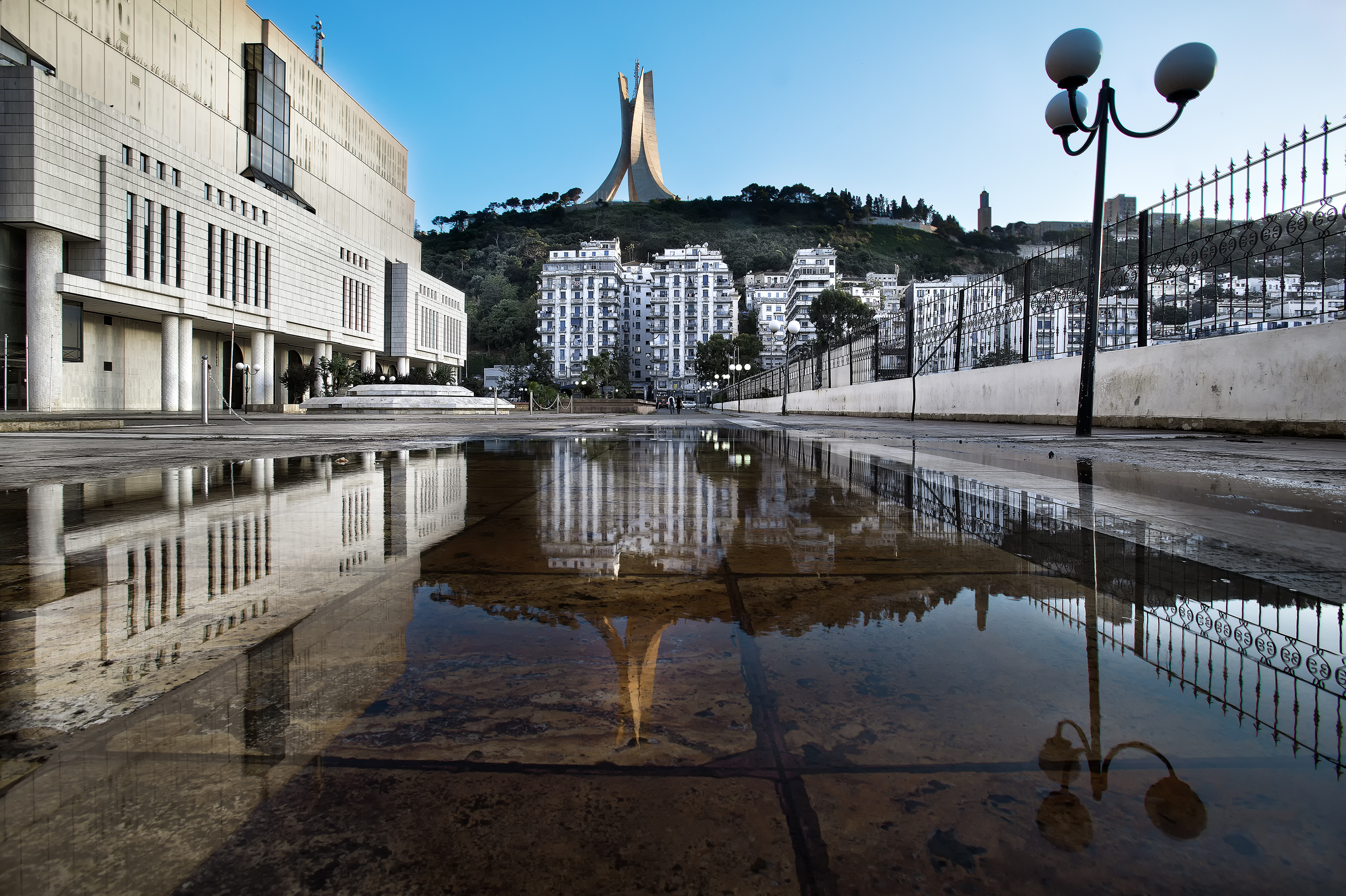
- View of the National Library of Algeria at Hamma in Algiers
- 36.74860475631731°N 3.0716080579152902°E
- Location: Algiers, Algeria
- Type: National library
- Established: 1835

The National Library of Algeria (Arabic: المكتبة الوطنيّة الجزائريّة; French: Bibliothèque nationale d'Algérie) is the main state library of Algeria, located in the Mohamed Belouizdad (formerly Hamma-Anassers) district of Algiers. It was first established in 1835 by the French colonial government, before becoming Algeria's national library when the country gained its independence in 1962.

== History ==
The library was established in 1835 by Adrien Berbrugger at the request of the French Ministry of War. From 1963, the library was housed in Dar Mustapha Pacha, a palace located in the Casbah of Algiers. Alongside the library, the palace also housed an archive and museum.

By 1947, the library had outgrown the space of the palace and was in need of larger premises. In addition to this, the palace was a poor environment for the preservation of rare books. Planning began for the construction of a new, modern building. In 1958, the library moved into premises on Tagarins Hill, Boulevard Frantz-Fanon (named in honor of Frantz Fanon) in 1958. The National Library played a key role in restoring and rebuilding the collection.

1962, a devastating bombing by the group Organisation armée secrète at the Bibliothèque universitaire d’Alger (Algerian University Library) caused a large fire, destroying around 385,000 works.

Following this, in 1984, a new building for the library began construction, which also allowed it to considerably develop its services. This facility opened on 1 November 1994, allowing public access from 16 April 1998. It has a floor area of 67,000 m^{2} (720,000 sq ft) and was designed to house more than 10 million books. It can accommodate more than 2,500 readers at a time. It is the legal deposit and copyright for Algeria.

Algeria's scientific and technical information needs are ensured by two organizations, the Centre for Technical and Scientific Information and Technology Transfer, the Algerian equivalent of the INIS network, and the National Social and Economic Documentation Centre, established in 1971, which ensures the selection and indexing of automated documentation on the social and economic development of the country and the collection of statistical data.

== Administrators - directors ==
=== French Algeria ===
- Adrien Berbrugger (1835-1869)
- Oscar Mac Carthy (1869-1891)
- Émile Maupas (1891-1916)
- Bojeron, per délégation (1916-1920)
- Gabriel Esquer (1920-1948)
- Germaine Lebel (1948-1962)

=== Algeria ===
- Mahmoud-Agha Bouayed (1962-1991)
- Amin Zaoui (2002-2008)
- Azzedine Mihoubi (2010-2013)
- Dahmane Abdelmadjid (20??-2015)
- Yasser Arafat Gana (2015-2017)
- Hayet Gouni (2017-)

== See also ==
- Centre Nationale des Archives (Algeria)

== Bibliography ==
- "Problems affecting the development of libraries in Algeria". Focus on International & Comparative Librarianship. 14. UK: Library Association. 1983. ISSN 0305-8468. (Includes national library)
- "Cultural heritage digitization projects in Algeria". IFLA Journal. 41 (3). 2015. doi:10.1177/0340035215603994. (Describes efforts of the national library)
