= Egyptian National Library and Archives =

National library in Cairo, Egypt

Coordinates: 30°03′59″N 31°13′39″E

Egyptian National Library and Archives دار الكتب والوثائق القومية
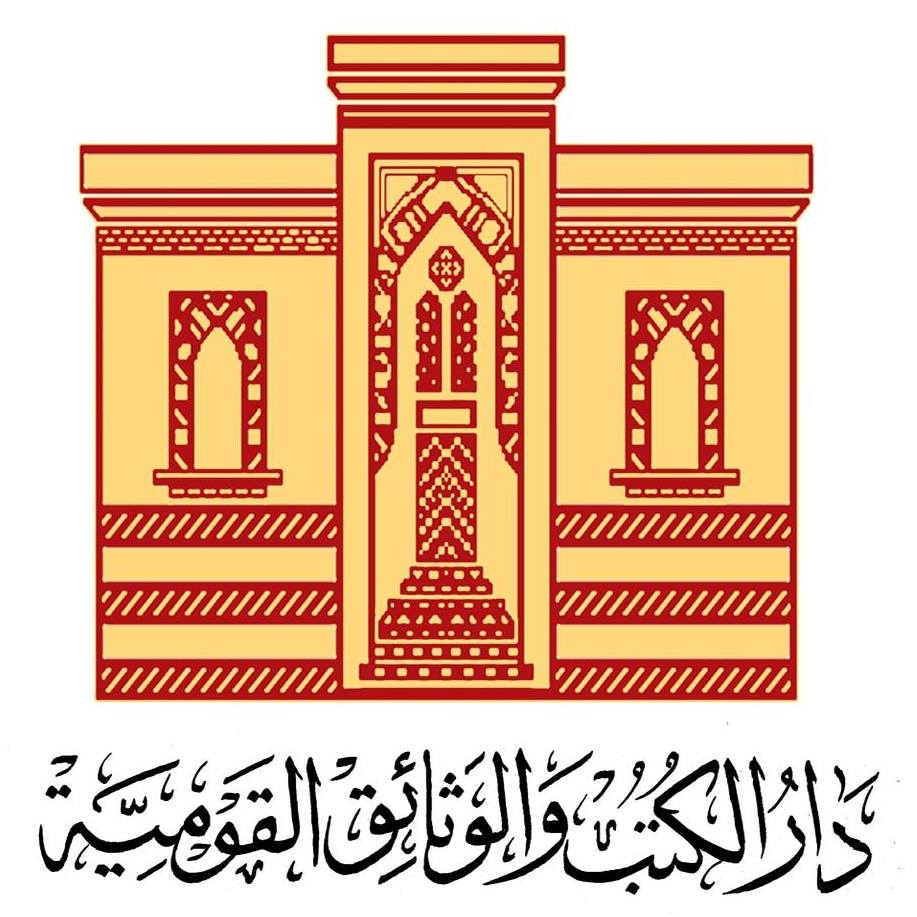
- Location: Cairo, Egypt
- Type: Public, National library and National archives.
- Established: 1870 (156 years ago)

Other information
- Parent organization: Ministry of Culture
- Website: www.darelkotob.gov.eg

The Egyptian National Library and Archives (Egyptian Arabic: دار الكتب والوثائق القومية; "Dar el-Kotob") is located in Nile Corniche, Cairo and is the largest library in Egypt, followed by Al-Azhar University and the Bibliotheca Alexandrina (New Library of Alexandria). The Egyptian National Library and Archives are a non-profit government organization.

The National Library houses several million volumes on a wide range of topics. It is one of the largest in the world with thousands of ancient collections. It contains a vast variety of Arabic-language and other Eastern manuscripts, the oldest in the world. The main library is a seven-story building in Ramlet Boulaq, a district of Cairo. The Egyptian National Archives are contained in an annex beside the building.

The National Archives, located in an annex beside the library, houses a vast and diverse collection. The holdings are particularly significant to those who work on Egyptian social and political history, although it is not open to the public.

== History ==
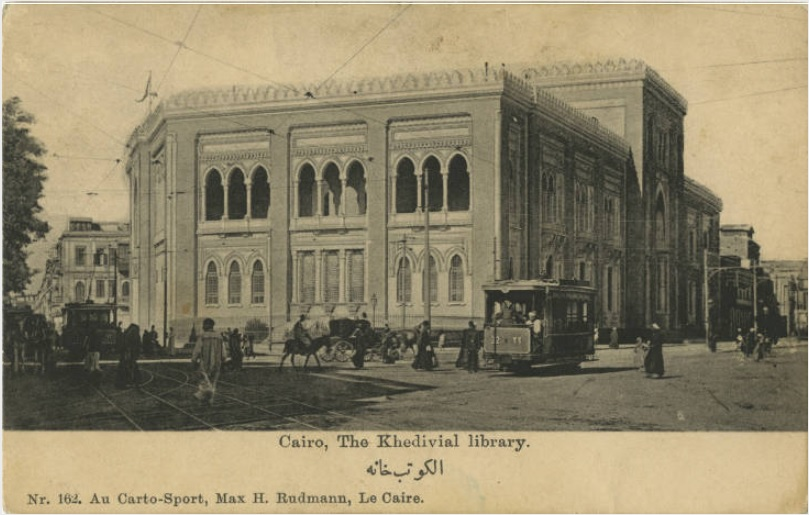
Cairo, the Khedival Library

The Egyptian National Library was proposed by minister Ali Pasha Mubarak, minister of public works, to Khedive Ismail in 1870. The library, which was known then as Khedivial Kutub Khana, was first located at the ground floor of Prince Mustafa Fadel's palace in Darb Al Gamamiz.

In 1889, the library was moved to the Salamlek of the same palace. Later, Khedive Tawfiq ordered a new facility to host the growing collection, but this was not accomplished until the time of Khedive Abbas Helmy II. In 1904 a new building in Bab Al Khalq opened its doors to the public housing both the National Library and the Museum of Islamic Art.

In the 1970s, a newer building was built on the Corniche, with an adjacent one for the archives, but Bab Al Khalq Library is still functioning and houses a museum.

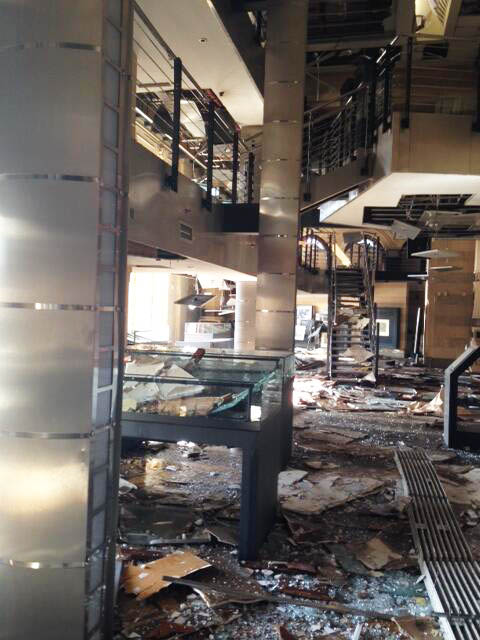
Damage sustained in the library's museum exhibition area after the 2014 car bombing.

On Friday, January 24, 2014, a car bomb meant to destroy the Police Headquarters across the street from the National Library and Archives did quite a bit of damage to the library's building and collections. National Library and Archive head Abdul Nasser Hassan estimated that the losses would be around $2.81 million in repairs. Lighting and ventilation systems were destroyed and the Neo-Mamluk architectural facade was heavily damaged. Showcases and displays containing irreplaceable ancient manuscripts and papyri within the library's museum exhibition area were damaged along with all the furniture in the building. The conservation staff at the National Library and Archives were able to save the documents on display, although they did sustain some damage.

== Contents ==
Collections include a wide variety of manuscripts of the Qur'an, written on paper and parchment. Some of which date back to early Kufic script. Others are written by celebrated calligraphers. Of Egyptian Islamic materials, there is perhaps the outstanding collection of illuminated manuscripts of the Qur'an in the Mamluk text-hand, and in Trilinear and Rayhani hands. There are also collections of Arabic papyri from different sites in Egypt, some dating to the 7th century AD or earlier. The library is a mine of information on early Islamic Egypt's social and cultural life. Ancient Persian and Ottoman documents are also part of the collection.

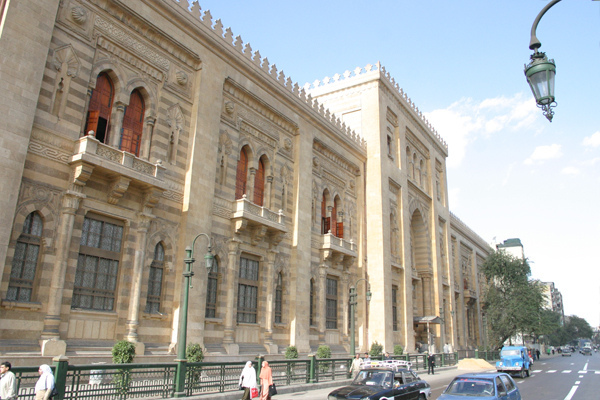
The Port Said street facade.

The library remains Egypt's largest resource of manuscripts and documents that include more than 57,000 of the most valuable manuscripts in the world. The manuscript collection covers a vast number of subjects, fully documented, dated, and compiled. It also houses a rare number of Arabic papyri. These are related to marriage, rent, and exchange contracts, as well as records, accounts of taxes, distribution of inheritance, etc. The oldest papyrus group dates back to the year AH 87 (AD 705); only 444 papyri from this collection were published.

The library also has a large collection of medieval Arabic coins from as early as AD 696, which were published by Stanley Lane-Poole, Bernhardt Moritz and recently by Norman D. Nicol, Jere L. Bacharach and Rifa'at al-Nabarawy in 1982. These collections are of high archeological value.

Collections formed by Ahmed Taymour Pasha, Ahmed Zaki Pasha, Ahmed Tal'aat Bey and Mustafa Fadel all came to the National Library in the early 20th century.

== See also ==
- Library of Alexandria
- National Archives of Egypt
- Unesco Memory of the World Register in Arab States

== Catalogues ==
- Moritz, Bernhardt: "Additions à la collection numismatique de la Bibliothèque Khédiviale". In: Bulletin de l'Institut Egyptien; 4e sér. 4 (1903), pp. 199–204.
- Nicol, Norman D.; el-Nabarawy, R. & Bacharach, J. L.: Catalog of the Islamic Coins, Glass Weights, Dies and Medals in the Egyptian National Library, Cairo. Malibu, California 1983.

== Bibliography ==
- Marcel Lajeunesse, ed. (2008). "Égypte". Les Bibliothèques nationales de la francophonie (PDF) (in French) (3rd ed.). Bibliothèque et Archives nationales du Québec. OCLC 401164333.
- "Egypt", World Report 2010, The Hague: International Federation of Library Associations, OCLC 225182140, archived from the original on 2019-06-29, "Freedom of access to information" (Includes information about the national library)
