= Centre National des Archives (Algeria) =

National Archives of Algeria
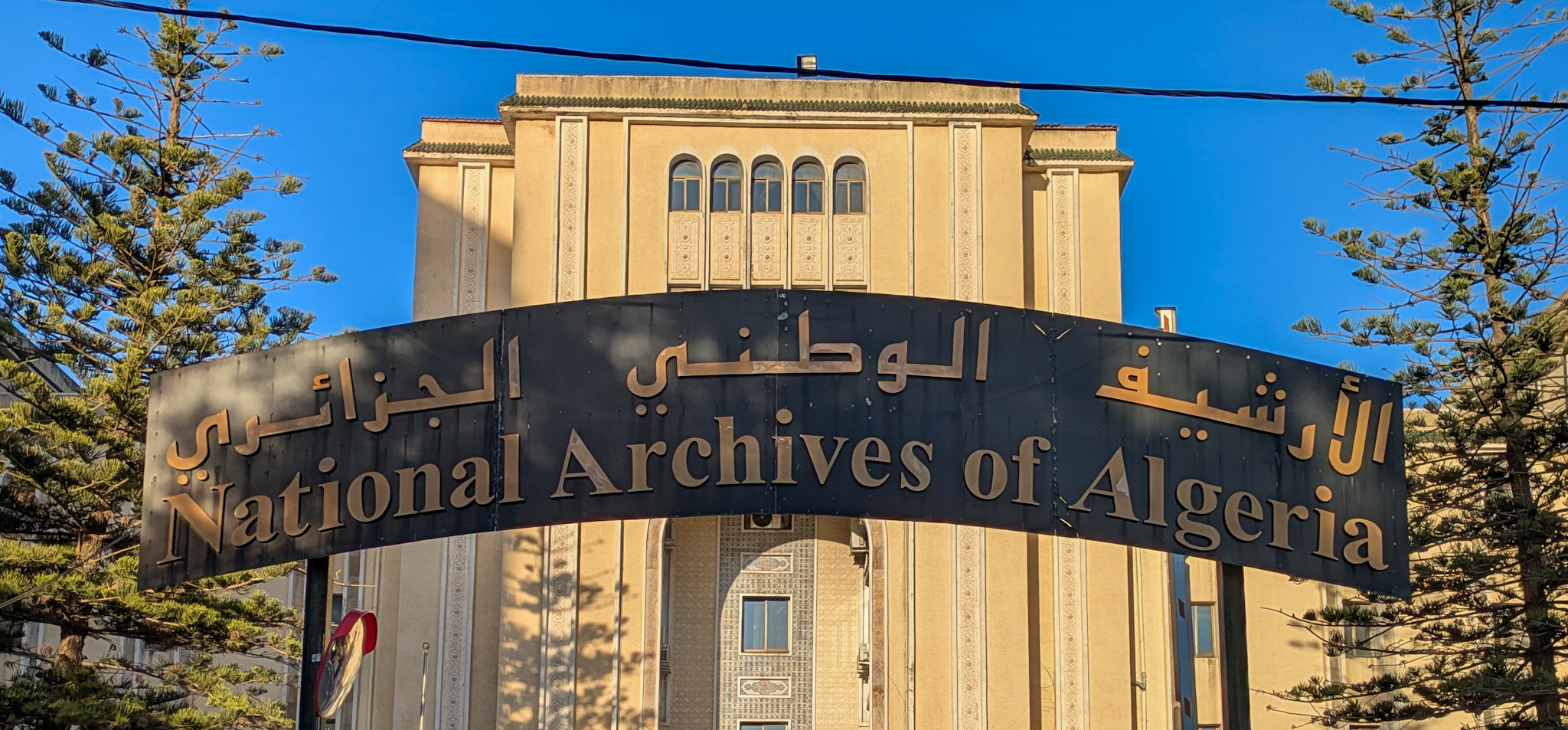
- Interactive map of National Archives of Algeria
- 36°43′45″N 3°03′31″E
- Location: Algiers, Algeria
- Type: Centre National des Archives
- Website: https://archives-can.dz/

The Centre national des Archives (Arabic: الأرشيف الوطني الجزائري, romanized: al-Arshīf al-Waṭanī al-Jazāʼirī) is the national archive of Algeria.

== History ==
The archives were part of the Ministry of Information and Culture from 1962 to 1971. The archives were formerly supervised by the Directorate of National Records (created by Decree No. 71/36, issued on 3 June 1971) and the Advisory Council for the National Archives (created by Decree No. 74/75).

On 20 March 1977, Decree No. 77 was issued, which regulated and clarified the role and functions of the Consultative Council for National Archives, the Central Repository of National Documents, and the Directorate of the National Archives.

Ordinance No. 71/56 of August 5, 1971 related to the management of the National Archives, which was attached to the Ministry of Culture. That order was canceled by Decree No. 83/89 of January 15, 1983.

A number of committees were formed from 1980 to 1987 to study various issues related to the archives, especially the legislative and organizational aspects whose work resulted in the creation of the National Archives Center and the issuance of a number of legislative and regulatory texts related to the archives and national archive institutions. These included Law 88 / 09 and Decrees No. 45 and 46 which established the Archives Foundation, comprising the National Archives Center and the General Directorate of the National Archives.

== See also ==
- List of archives in Algeria
- National Library of Algeria
- List of national archives
