= National Library of the Kingdom of Morocco =

National library of Morocco in Rabat

- المكتبة الوطنية للمملكة المغربية ⵜⴰⵙⴷⵍⵉⵙⵜ ⵜⴰⵏⴰⵎⵓⵔⵜ ⵏ ⵜⴳⵍⴷⵉⵜ ⵜⴰⵎⵔⵔⵓⴽⵉⵜ; Bibliothèque nationale du Royaume du Maroc

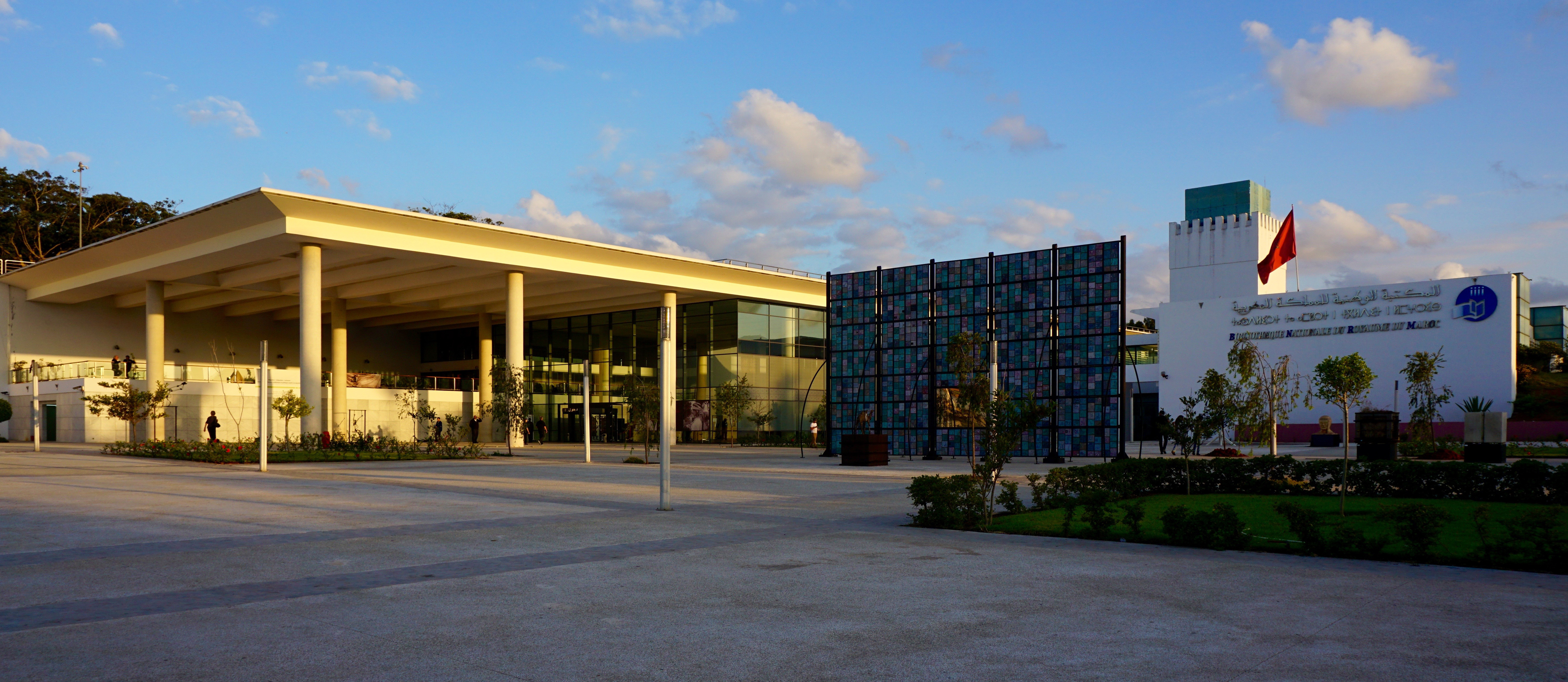
- National Library building in Rabat
- 34°00′30″N 6°50′33″W
- Location: Rabat, Morocco
- Established: 1924
- Reference to legal mandate: Dahir (royal decree), 1926, establishing the library as a public institution; dahir of 11 November 2003, renaming it the National Library of the Kingdom of Morocco
- Branches: 1 (Tetouan)

Other information
- Director: Mohamed El Ferrane

The National Library of the Kingdom of Morocco (Arabic: المكتبة الوطنية للمملكة المغربية, romanized: Al-Maktabah al-Waṭanīyah lil-Mamlakah al-Maghribīyah; Standard Moroccan Tamazight: ⵜⴰⵙⴷⵍⵉⵙⵜ ⵜⴰⵏⴰⵎⵓⵔⵜ ⵏ ⵜⴳⵍⴷⵉⵜ ⵜⴰⵎⵔⵔⵓⴽⵉⵜ; French: Bibliothèque nationale du Royaume du Maroc, formerly Bibliothèque générale and Bibliothèque générale et Archives) is the national library of Morocco. It is located in Rabat and has a branch in Tetouan.

The institution originated as the Bibliothèque Générale, established in 1924. In 2003, it adopted its current name.

== History ==
The first national library in Morocco was founded in 1924. Following a dahir (royal decree) issued in 1926, it became a public establishment. In 1984, Muhammad Abu Khubza authored a library catalog for the Tetouan branch.

The current building in Rabat-Agdal was designed by architects Rachid Andaloussi and Abdelouahed Mountassir of Casablanca and was inaugurated by King Mohammed VI on 15 October 2008. Inspired by the square minarets of traditional Moroccan architecture, the building consists of a main structure and an adjoining tower, topped with a glass roof and decorated with modern Arabic calligraphy. It also includes a large courtyard and outdoor spaces used for cultural events and performances.

== See also ==
- Archives du Maroc
- List of national libraries

== Bibliography ==
- Mohammed Ibrahim El Kettani (1973), Recueil sélectif de textes en arabe provenant d'archives marocaines et présentant un intérêt scientifique comme source pour l'histoire africaine (in French), Unesco, OCLC 493611466. (Includes discussion of items held in the library)
- "Bibliothèque nationale du Royaume: un joyau pour abriter les trésors culturels du Maroc", Le Matin (in French), Casablanca, 24 July 2003
- "Dahir no. 1-03-200 du 16 ramadan 1424 (11 novembre 2003) portant promulgation de la loi no. 67-99 relative à la Bibliothèque nationale du Royaume du Maroc" (PDF). Bulletin officiel du Royaume du Maroc (in French) (5184): 150–152. 2004. ISSN 0851-1217. Archived from the original (PDF) on 2014-02-02.
- Marcel Lajeunesse, ed. (2008). "Maroc". Les Bibliothèques nationales de la francophonie (PDF) (in French) (3rd ed.). Bibliothèque et Archives nationales du Québec. pp. 75–80. OCLC 401164333.
- "Morocco", World Report 2010, The Hague: International Federation of Library Associations, OCLC 225182140, archived from the original on 2019-06-29, "Freedom of access to information" (Includes information about the national library)
