= Archives du Maroc =

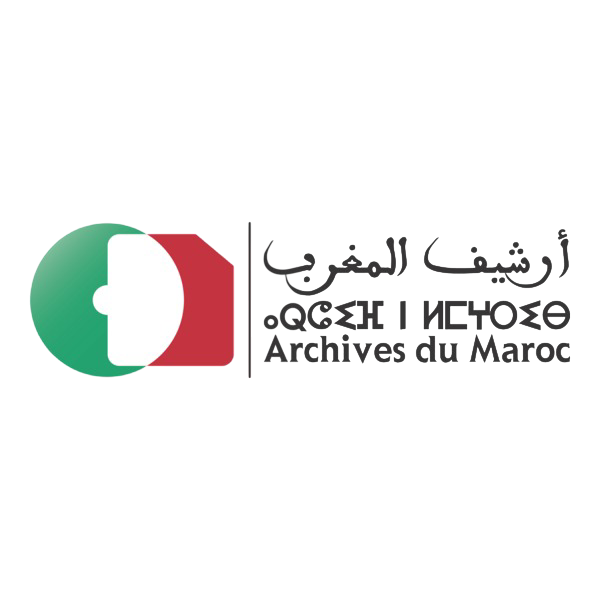
- Established: 2007; 19 years ago
- Type: Public establishment
- Headquarters: Rabat, Morocco
- Director: Latifa Moftaqir
- Parent organization: Ministry of Youth, Culture and Communication
- Website: archivesdumaroc.ma

Archives du Maroc is a Moroccan public institution responsible for the collection, preservation, and promotion of public archives. Based in Rabat, it contributes to safeguarding the national archival heritage and making it accessible to the public.

== History ==
Archives du Maroc was established in 2007 by Law No. 69-99 relating to archives. This law introduced a legal framework for the organization and management of public archives in Morocco.

Before this reform, archival management was handled in a fragmented manner across different public administrations. The creation of the institution made it possible to structure archival policy and centralize the management of archival holdings.

== Missions ==
Archives du Maroc is responsible for implementing the State’s policy on archives. Its missions include:

- the collection and receipt of public archives;
- the preservation, classification, and management of archival holdings;
- the provision of access to archives for the public, in accordance with legal time limits;
- the promotion of archival heritage, notably through exhibitions and publications;
- the supervision of archival management within public administrations.

It also contributes to the development of standards and practices in the field of archiving.

== Organization ==
Archives du Maroc is a public institution with legal personality and financial autonomy. It operates under the authority of the Ministry of Youth, Culture and Communication.

It is headed by a director and includes departments responsible for the collection, processing, preservation, and communication of archives.

The institution preserves documents produced by public administrations across various sectors of state activity. Its collections include administrative, historical, and institutional archives.

== Activities ==
Archives du Maroc conducts activities related to the management and dissemination of archives. It organizes exhibitions, conferences, and awareness initiatives.

The institution also contributes to training and supports public administrations in managing their archival records.

== See also ==
- Archives
- Cultural heritage
- Bibliothèque Nationale du Royaume du Maroc
