= Coromandel, Mauritius =

Suburb of Municipality of Beau Bassin Rose Hill in the Republic of Mauritius

Coordinates: 20.1879°S 57.4659°E

Coromandel is a suburb of the Municipality of Beau Bassin-Rose Hill in the Republic of Mauritius. It is a three-border region located at the edge of the Plaine Wilhems, Port Louis and Black River Districts. The postcode for Coromandel is 71608 and it is home to the Coromandel Industrial Zone and the Coromandel Metro Express Station.
