= Ghana Memory of the World Register =

The Ghana Memory of the World Register is a register of documentary heritage in Ghana. It is one of the national registers of UNESCO's Memory of the World Programme, which also includes an international register and three regional registers. Ghana's national register was launched in April 2026. So far nine pieces of documentary heritage have been inscribed.

Ghana is also a co-nominee of one inscription on the Memory of the World International Register: the archives of the Dutch West India Company, some of which are held at the National Archives of Ghana.

== Inscriptions ==
Title	Year of inscription	Location	Source
The Furley Collection: Colonial Era Manuscripts, Maps, and Printed Works on the Gold Coast (1469–1859)	2026	Balme Library, University of Ghana	
The Bond of 1844	2026	Public Records and Archives Administration Department	
King Edward Prempeh I (Asantehene) Letters 1912–1924	2026	KNUST Library and Manhyia Palace Museum	
Ghana National Museum Inventory (Catalogue/Index) 1929–1990	2026	Ghana Museums & Monuments Board	
Selected State Photographs of Dr Kwame Nkrumah's Administration (1951–1966)	2026	Information Services Department of Ghana	
The Volta River Project — Report of the Preparatory Commission, Appendices to the Report and Engineering Report	2026	Ghana Library	
J. H. Kwabena Nketia Field Recordings (1952–1979)	2026	University of Ghana Archives	
The Ephraim Amu Papers	2026	Carl Christian Reindorf Archives (CCRA)	
Iconic Midnight Speech of Osagyefo Dr. Kwame Nkrumah — March 1957	2026	University of Ghana Archives	
