= Ljunggren =

Ljunggren is a Swedish surname. Notable people with the surname include:

- Anna Elisabeth Ljunggren, née Storm-Mathisen (1943–2010), Norwegian physiotherapist
- Anna Ljunggren (born 1984), Norwegian politician for the Labour Party
- Bobby Ljunggren (born 1961), Swedish songwriter
- Daniel Ljunggren (born 1994), Swedish ice hockey player
- Elisabeth Ljunggren (born 1948), Swedish swimmer
- Florence Ljunggren (1906–1988), American librarian
- Gustaf Ljunggren (academician) (1823–1905), Swedish man of letters, born at Lund, the son of a clergyman
- Gustaf Ljunggren (1894–1966), Swedish chemist
- John Ljunggren (1919–2000), Swedish athlete who competed mainly in the 50 kilometer walk
- Olle Ljunggren (1921–2003), Swedish middle-distance runner
- Michael Ljunggren (1962–1995), Swedish mobster and President of the Bandidos Motorcycle Club's Swedish chapters
- Sten Ljunggren (born 1938), Swedish character actor
- Tor Arne Bell Ljunggren (born 1962), Norwegian politician
- Wilhelm Ljunggren (1905–1973), Norwegian mathematician, specializing in number theory

== See also ==
- Ljungan
- Lugeon
