= List of Memory of the World Register in Brazil =

The Memory of the World International Register, listing documentary heritage of global importance, includes ten works from Brazil. The Emperor's collection was the first recorded work to be included in the list in 2003, a heritage with 23,000 photographs of Brazil and the world from the 19th century, which had been donated by D. Pedro II and integrates the Thereza Christina Maria Collection. The Brazilian National Library is one of the members of the Brazilian Committee program and, as such, participates in the co-ordination of the action plans developed in Brazil.

UNESCO established the Memory of the World Programme in 1992.

The Brazilian National Committee of UNESCO also maintains a Brazil Memory of the World Register, listing documentary heritage of great national importance.

== List ==
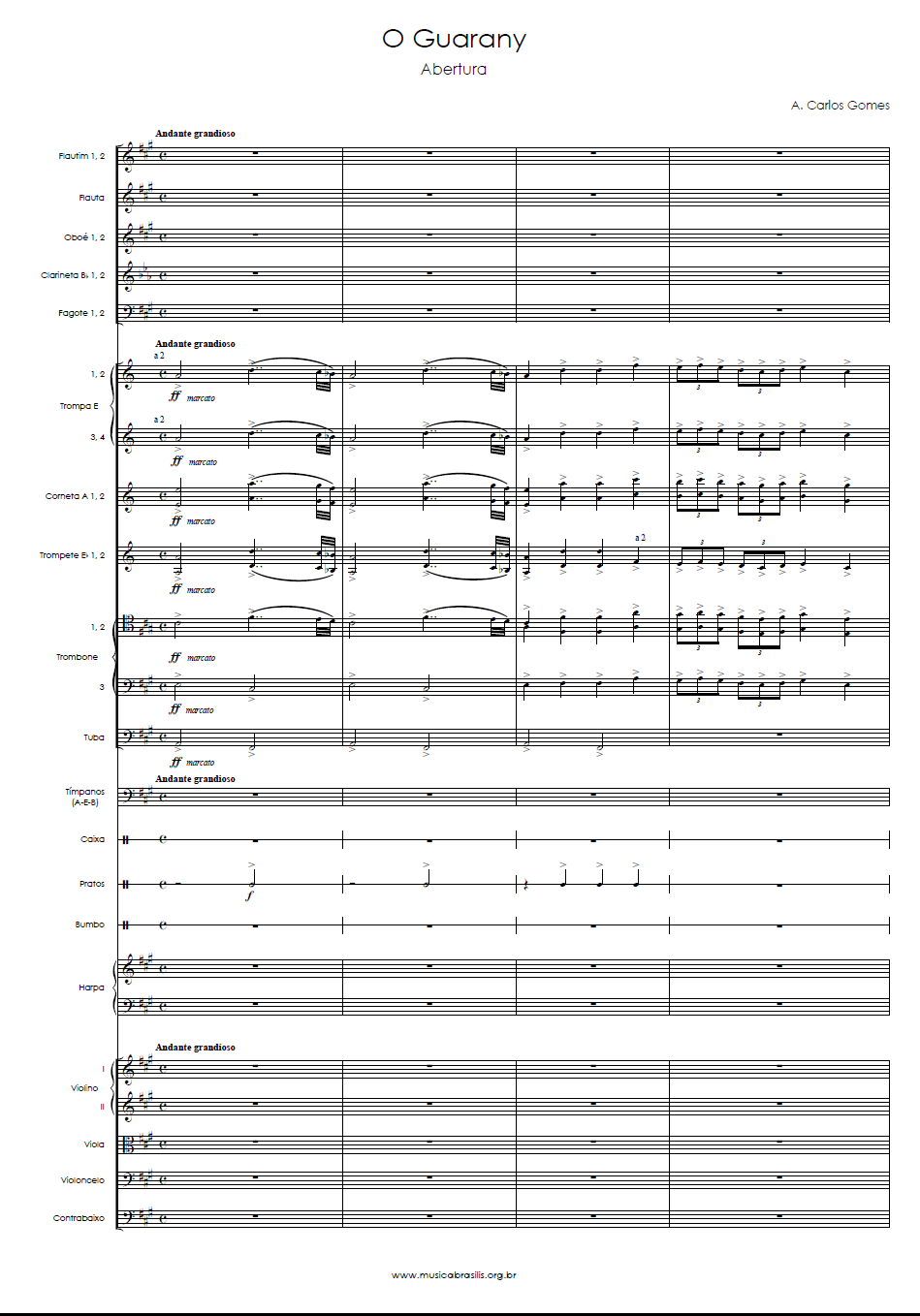
O Guarany

Documentary heritage^{[A]}	Country/territory	Custodian(s)	Year inscribed	Reference
The Emperor's collection: foreign and Brazilian photography in the 19th century	Brazil	Fundação Biblioteca Nacional	2003	
Network of information and counter information on the military regime in Brazil (1964-1985)	Brazil	National Archives of Brazil	2011	
Dutch West India Company (Westindische Compagnie) archives	Brazil, Ghana, Netherlands, Guyana, Netherlands Antilles, Suriname, United Kingdom, United States	Albany County Hall of Records; Archivo Nashonal; Municipal Archives New York; Nationaal Archief; Nationaal Archief Surinamee; The National Archives-Kew; New York State Archives; National archives of Guyana	2011	
Architectural Archive of Oscar Niemeyer	Brazil	Fundação Oscar Niemeyer para Fins Culturais	2013	
Documents regarding the Emperor D. Pedro II’s journeys in Brazil and abroad	Brazil	Museu Imperial	2013	
Antonio Carlos Gomes	Brazil, Italy	Arquivo Nacional (AN) - Ministério da Justiça; Escola de Música da Universidade Federal do Rio de Janeiro; Fundação Biblioteca Nacional; Museu Histórico Nacional; Museu Imperial; Museu da Universidade Federal do Pará	2015	
Fundo Comitê de Defesa dos Direitos Humanos para os Países do Cone Sul (CLAMOR)	Brazil, Uruguay	Centro de Documentação e Informação Científica “Prof. Casemiro dos Reis Filho”	2015	
The War of the Triple Alliance Iconographic and cartographic presentations	Brazil, Uruguay	Biblioteca Nacional del Uruguay; National History Museum of Uruguay	2015	
Collection Educator Paulo Freire	Brazil	Instituto Paulo Freire	2017	
Nise da Silveira Personal Archive	Brazil	Museu de Imagens do Inconsciente	2017	

== See also ==
- Memory of the World Register – Latin America and the Caribbean
