= Memory of the World Register of International Organizations =

UNESCO's Memory of the World International Register lists documentary heritage – texts, audio-visual materials, library and archive holdings – that have been judged to be of global importance. The register brings that heritage to the attention of experts and the wider public, promoting the preservation, digitization, and dissemination of those materials. The first inscriptions were added to the register in 1997. As of 2025, 570 pieces of documentary heritage had been included. Of these, ten were nominated by international organizations.

== List by international organization ==
Documentary heritage (Note: Names and spellings provided are based on the official list released by the Memory of the World Programme.)	International organization	Custodian(s), Location(s)	Year inscribed	Reference
Humanity's First Recordings of its Own Voice: The Phonautograms of Édouard-Léon Scott de Martinville (c.1853-1860)	Association for Recorded Sound Collections (ARSC)	French Academy of Sciences 48°51′26″N 2°20′13″E; National Industrial Property Institute 48°54′17″N 2°15′44″E; Bibliothèque de l’Institut de France 48°51′22″N 2°20′01″E; Société d’encouragement pour l’industrie nationale 48°51′16″N 2°19′52″E	2015	
UNESCO IBE Historical Archives (1925–1969)	International Bureau of Education	International Bureau of Education 46°13′53″N 6°07′54″E	2025	
Archives of the International Prisoners of War Agency, 1914–1923	International Committee of the Red Cross (ICRC)	International Red Cross and Red Crescent Museum, Geneva 46°13′38″N 6°08′13″E	2007	
Archives of the International Tracing Service	International Tracing Service (ITS)	Archives of the International Tracing Service, Bad Arolsen 51°22′41″N 9°01′09″E	2013	
Archives of the International Institute of Intellectual Cooperation, 1925–1946	UNESCO Archive	UNESCO Archive, Paris 48°50′59″N 2°18′23″E	2017	
Drafting of the International Bill of Human Rights – UN Archives and UN Official Documents – 1946 to 1966	United Nations Archives and Records Management Section, United Nations Library & Archives Geneva	United Nations Office at Geneva 46°13′36″N 6°08′25″E	2025	
League of Nations archives 1919–1946	United Nations Office at Geneva (UNOG)	United Nations Office at Geneva 46°13′36″N 6°08′25″E	2009	
UNRWA Photo and Film Archives of Palestinian Refugees	United Nations Relief and Works Agency for Palestine Refugees (UNRWA)	The United Nations Relief and Works Agency for Palestine Refugees in the Near East Public Information Office, Jerusalem 31°47′49″N 35°13′33″E	2009	
Records of the Smallpox Eradication Programme of the World Health Organization	World Health Organization (WHO)	Records and Archives Unit, WHO Headquarters, Geneva 46°13′58″N 6°08′04″E	2017	
IMO Legacy Collection	World Meteorological Organization	World Meteorological Organization, Geneva 46°12′47″N 6°07′09″E	2025	
