= Brazil Memory of the World Register =

The Brazil Memory of the World Register lists cultural heritage of national importance, as part of the UNESCO Memory of the World Programme. There are also many Brazilian entries on the Memory of the World International Register.

Documentary heritage^{[A]}	Custodian(s), Location(s)	Year inscribed	Reference
Getúlio Vargas Collection	Centro de Pesquisa e Documentação de História Contemporânea do Brasil - CPDOC / Fundação Getúlio Vargas	2007	
João Guimarães Rosa Collection	Instituto de Estudos Brasileiros da Universidade de São Paulo	2007	
Machado de Assis Collection	Academia Brasileira de Letras	2007	
Oswaldo Cruz Collection	Casa de Oswaldo Cruz / Fundação Oswaldo Cruz (FIOCRUZ)	2007	
Filme Limite	Fundação Cinemateca Brasileira	2007	
NOVACAP Fund	Arquivo Público do Distrito Federal	2007	
Inconfidência em Minas - Levante de Tiradentes	Arquivo Nacional (AN) 22°54′23″S 43°11′27″W	2007	
Polícias Políticas no Estado do Rio de Janeiro	Arquivo Público do Estado do Rio de Janeiro (APERJ)	2007	
Vereanças do Senado da Câmara	Arquivo Geral da Cidade do Rio de Janeiro (AGCRJ)	2007	
Joaquim Nabuco Collection	Fundação Joaquim Nabuco	2008	
Carta de Abertura dos Portos	Fundação Biblioteca Nacional 22°54′35″S 43°10′31″W	2008	
Conjunto Livros Foreiros	Arquivo Público Municipal Antonino Guimarães	2008	
Conselho de Fiscalização das Expedições Artísticas e Científicas no Brasil	Museu de Astronomia e Ciências Afins (MAST)	2008	
Carlos Chagas Fund	Casa de Oswaldo Cruz / Fundação Oswaldo Cruz (FIOCRUZ)	2008	
Fundo Força Expedicionária Brasileira	Arquivo Histórico do Exército	2008	
Fundo SPI – Serviço de Proteção aos Índios	Museu do Índio	2008	
Lei Áurea	Arquivo Nacional (AN) 22°54′23″S 43°11′27″W	2008	
Tribunal da Relação do Estado do Brasil	Fundação Pedro Calmon / Centro de Memória e Arquivo Público da Bahia	2008	
Jesco von Puttkamer Collection	Universidade Católica de Goiás / Instituto Goiano de Pré-História e Antropologia	2009	
Canudos Archive	Museu da República; Instituto Brasileiro de Museus (IBRAM)	2009	
Atas da Câmara Municipal da Cidade de Salvador	Arquivo Histórico Municipal de Salvador / Fundação Gregório de Mattos	2009	
Florestan Fernandes Fund	Universidade Federal de São Carlos (UFSCar / Biblioteca Comunitária)	2009	
Paraguayan War Fund	Arquivo Histórico do Exército / Diretoria do Patrimônio Histórico Cultural do Exército	2009	
Livros de Registro - Matrícula de Imigrantes	Memorial do Imigrante [Transferido em 2010 para o Arquivo Público do Estado de São Paulo]	2009	
Marks of Slavery - Register of Slaves' Burials - Banguê Books (under digitization)	Santa Casa de Misericórdia da Bahia	2009	
Missão de Pesquisas Folclóricas	Acervo Histórico da Discoteca Oneyda Alvarenga / Centro Cultural São Paulo	2009	
Relações de Vapores do Serviço de Polícia Marítima, Aérea e de Fronteiras / São Paulo - Santos	Arquivo Nacional (AN) 22°54′23″S 43°11′27″W	2009	
Abrindo Estradas no Mar: folhas de bordo e relatórios de levantamento hidrográfico da DHN (1901- 1975)	Diretoria de Hidrografia e Navegação da Marinha	2010	
Agência Nacional	Arquivo Nacional (AN) 22°54′23″S 43°11′27″W; Fundação Cinemateca Brasileira	2010	
Arquivo Tamandaré: uma janela para o Estado Imperial brasileiro	Diretoria de Hidrografia e Navegação da Marinha	2010	
Atlas Vingboons: mapas e cartas da costa atlântica da América do Sul no século XVII	Instituto Arqueológico, Histórico e Geográfico Pernambucano (IAHGP)	2010	
Alexandre Rodrigues Ferreira Collection	Fundação Biblioteca Nacional 22°54′35″S 43°10′31″W; Museu Nacional	2010	
Registro de Entrada de Passageiros no Porto de Salvador (Bahia)	Arquivo Público da Bahia	2010	
Secretaria de Governo da Capitania	Arquivo Público do Estado do Pará (APEP)	2010	
Roquette-Pinto Collection	Academia Brasileira de Letras	2011	
Rui Barbosa Collection	Fundação Casa de Rui Barbosa	2011	
As famosas Armadas Portuguesas da Carreira das Índias (1496–1650)	Diretoria do Patrimônio Histórico e Documentação da Marinha – Arquivo da Marinha	2011	
Atas da Câmara de Recife	Instituto Arqueológico, Histórico e Geográfico de Pernambuco (IAHGP)	2011	
Francisco Bhering Fund – A Carta do Brasil ao Milionésimo	Arquivo Nacional (AN) 22°54′23″S 43°11′27″W	2011	
Imagens Paulistanas: álbuns fotográficos da cidade de São Paulo	Biblioteca Mário de Andrade cidade de São Paulo	2011	
Matrizes de gravura da Casa Literária do Arco do Cego	Fundação Biblioteca Nacional 22°54′35″S 43°10′31″W	2011	
Herbert de Souza Archive	Centro de Pesquisa e Documentação de História Contemporânea do Brasil (CPDOC/Fundação Getúlio Vargas)	2012	
Atlas e Mapa Ciera	Fundação Biblioteca Nacional 22°54′35″S 43°10′31″W	2012	
Câmara Municipal de Ouro Preto	Arquivo Público Mineiro	2012	
Carlos Gomes Collection	Museu Imperial 22°30′29″S 43°10′31″W	2012	
Coleção de Livros do Tombo do Mosteiro de São Bento da Bahia	Mosteiro de São Bento da Bahia	2012	
Colônia Agrícola Nacional de Dourados (CAND)	Fundação de Cultura do Estado de Mato Grosso do Sul – FCMS/Arquivo Público Estadual	2012	
Livro dos Bens Livres pertencentes aos Jesuítas dos Colégios de Olinda e Recife, Pernambuco	Instituto Arqueológico Histórico e Geográfico de Pernambuco (IAHGP)	2012	
Mapa Etno-Histórico do Brazil e Regiões Adjacentes, por Curt Nimuendajú	Museu Paraense Emílio Goeldi	2012	
Negativos de Vidro do Fundo Instituto Oswaldo Cruz	Casa de Oswaldo Cruz / Fundação Oswaldo Cruz (FIOCRUZ)	2012	
Processos trabalhistas: dissídios coletivos e individuais	Tribunal Regional do Trabalho da 6a Região – Memorial da Justiça do Trabalho em Pernambuco	2012	
Assembleia Geral Constituinte e Legislativa do Império do Brasil - 1823	Câmara dos Deputados	2013	
War of Canudos	Arquivo Histórico do Exército	2013	
Cartas Régias 1648–1821	Fundação Pedro Calmon / Arquivo Público do Estado da Bahia	2013	
Coleção Memória da Psiquiatria Brasileira	Universidade Federal do Rio de Janeiro / Instituto de Psiquiatria – IPUB / UFRJ	2013	
Coleção Sanson – Fotografias estereoscópicas de vidro pelo fotógrafo amador Octávio Mendes de Oliveira Castro	Museu Imperial 22°30′29″S 43°10′31″W	2013	
Comissão Organizadora do Segundo Congresso Operário Brasileiro	Arquivo Geral da Cidade do Rio de Janeiro (AGCRJ)	2013	
Manuscritos musicais de Ernesto Nazareth	Fundação Biblioteca Nacional 22°54′35″S 43°10′31″W	2013	
Processos Trabalhistas do Tribunal Regional do Trabalho da 4ª Região	Tribunal Regional do Trabalho da 4ª Região (Porto Alegre)	2013	
Acervo documental e iconográfico de Abdias Nascimento	Instituto de Pesquisa e Estudos Afro Brasileiros (IPEAFRO)	2014	
Cartas Andradinas	Fundação Biblioteca Nacional 22°54′35″S 43°10′31″W	2014	
Francisco Curt Lange Collection	Museu da Inconfidência	2014	
Plínio Salgado Fund	Arquivo Público e Histórico do Município de Rio Claro “Oscar de Arruda Penteado”	2014	
O Jornal Abolicionista "A Redempção"	Arquivo Público do Estado de São Paulo	2014	
Primeiro Empréstimo Externo Brasileiro	Museu da Fazenda Federal	2014	
Série Aforamentos	Arquivo Geral da Cidade do Rio de Janeiro (AGCRJ)	2014	
Série Falas do Trono	Senado Federal	2014	
Acervo da Comissão Construtora da Nova Capital - Belo Horizonte (1892–1903)	Arquivo Público da Cidade de Belo Horizonte - APCBH/FMC; Museu Histórico Abílio Barreto - MHAB/FMC; Arquivo Público Mineiro (APM)	2015	
Arquivo da Secretaria de Governo da Capitania de São Paulo (1611–1852)	Arquivo Público do Estado de São Paulo	2015	
Personal Archive of Rubens Gerchman (1942–2008)	Instituto Rubens Gerchman	2015	
Cultura e Opulência do Brasil, De André João Antonil	Fundação Biblioteca Nacional 22°54′35″S 43°10′31″W	2015	
Decisões que Marcaram Época: A Caminhada do Poder Judiciário no Reconhecimento de Direitos Sociais aos Homossexuais	Justiça Federal de 1º Grau no Rio Grande do Sul – Seção Judiciária do RS (SJRS)	2015	
Iconografia do Rio de Janeiro na Coleção Geyer (séculos XVI a XIX)	Casa Geyer; Museu Imperial 22°30′29″S 43°10′31″W; IBRAM	2015	
Partituras - Obras de Heitor Villa Lobos (1901- 1959)	Museu Villa Lobos; IBRAM	2015	
Processos Judiciais Trabalhistas: Doenças Ocupacionais na Mineração em Minas Gerais – Dissídio Individuais e Coletivos (1941–2005)	Tribunal Regional do Trabalho da 3ª Região – Minas Gerais	2015	
Registros Fotográficos Oficiais das Intervenções Urbanas na Cidade do Rio de Janeiro (1900–1950)	Arquivo Geral da Cidade do Rio de Janeiro	2015	
República e Positivismo: A Produção Intellectual da Igreja Positivista do Brasil	Igreja Positivista do Brasil (IPB)	2015	
Archive of Jean-Pierre Chabloz: Referente à Batalha da Borracha	Museu de Arte da Universidade Federal do Ceará	2016	
Arthur Ramos archive	Fundação Biblioteca Nacional 22°54′35″S 43°10′31″W	2016	
Garcia Circus archive	Centro de Memória do Circo, da Secretaria Municipal de Cultura de São Paulo	2016	
Arquivo da Comissão Teotônio Vilela de Direitos Humanos, 1983–2016	Arquivo Público do Estado de São Paulo	2016	
Coleção de Obras Raras da Biblioteca Mineiriana do Instituto Cultural Amilcar Martins	Instituto Cultural Amilcar Martins	2016	
Conjunto Documental Companhia Empório Industrial do Norte, 1891- 1973	Arquivo Público do Estado da Bahia, da Fundação Pedro Calmon	2016	
Dissídios Trabalhistas do Conselho Nacional do Trabalho: Um Retrato da Sociedade Brasileira da Era Vargas	Tribunal Superior do Trabalho	2016	
Pensar o Brasil: A Revista do Instituto Histórico e Geográfico Brasileiro, 1839–2011	Instituto Histórico e Geográfico Brasileiro	2016	
Lima Barreto Collection	Fundação Biblioteca Nacional 22°54′35″S 43°10′31″W	2017	
Atas do Montepio Geral de Economia dos Servidores do Estado – o início da Previdência no Brasil	Mongeral Aegon Seguros e Previdência	2017	
Coleção Família Passos	Museu da República	2017	
Coleção Tribunal de Segurança Nacional: an atuação ao Supremo Tribunal Militar como instância revisional (1936–1955)	Superior Tribunal Militar	2017	
Vladimir Kozák Collection: Acervo Iconográfico, Filmográfico e Textual de Povos Indígenas Brasileiros (1948 – 1978)	Museu Paranaense	2017	
Correspondência Original dos Governadores do Pará com a Corte. Cartas e Anexos (1764–1807)	Arquivo Nacional (AN) 22°54′23″S 43°11′27″W	2017	
Formulário Médico: manuscrito atribuído aos Jesuítas e encontrado em uma arca da Igreja de São Francisco de Curitiba	Fundação Oswaldo Cruz	2017	
Livros de Registros da Polícia Militar da Bahia	Polícia Militar da Bahia	2017	
Registros Iconográficos da Revolta da Armada (1893- 1894)	Arquivo Geral da Cidade do Rio de Janeiro; Instituto Moreira Salles; Museu Histórico Nacional 22°54′21″S 43°10′10″W	2017	
Testamento do Senhor Martim Afonso de Sousa e de Sua Mulher Dona Ana Pimentel	Universidade Federal de Minas Gerais	2017	
Acervos de quatro fortificações da Capitania de Mato Grosso, 1768- 1822	Superintendência do Arquivo Público do Estado de Mato Grosso	2018	
Africanos Livres na Justiça Amazonense do Século XIX	Tribunal de Justiça do Estado do Amazonas	2018	
Em busca da felicidade: roteiros da primeira radionovela brasileira, 1941–1943	Empresa Brasileira de Comunicação (EBC)	2018	
Feminismo, ciência e política – o legado Bertha Lutz, 1881–1985	Arquivo Histórico do Itamaraty; Arquivo Nacional (AN) 22°54′23″S 43°11′27″W; Centro de Documentação e Informação da Câmara dos Deputados; Centro de Memória da Universidade Estadual de Campinas – CMU/UNICAMP	2018	
Fundo Assessoria de Segurança e Informações da Fundação Nacional do Índio – ASI/Funai, 1968–2000	Arquivo Nacional (AN) 22°54′23″S 43°11′27″W	2018	
Imprensas negra e abolicionista do século XIX na Biblioteca Nacional	Fundação Biblioteca Nacional 22°54′35″S 43°10′31″W	2018	
Inventários post-mortem do Cartório do Primeiro Ofício de Mariana, 1713- 1920	Arquivo Histórico da Casa Setecentista de Mariana (AHCSM)	2018	
Livro de Inventários da Catedral de Mariana, 1749- 1904	Arquivo Eclesiástico Dom Oscar de Oliveira	2018	
Processos de reconhecimento da união estável homoafetiva pelo Supremo Tribunal Federal e a garantia dos direitos fundamentais aos homossexuais	Supremo Tribunal Federal	2018	
Relíquia da Irmandade Devoção de Nossa Senhora da Solidade dos Desvalidos, Actas 1832- 1847	Sociedade Protectora dos Desvalidos	2018	
