= National Archives of Ghana =

Organization in Ghana

The National Archives of Ghana were located in Accra. The efforts to create an archive started in 1946 and the first Ghanaian chief archivist was J. M. Akita in 1949. The National Archives was replaced by the Public Records and Archives Administration Department in 1997.

A department was established in the Government's Agent's office, Kumasi on 3 August 1959. The original intention was to house archives for the Ashanti, Brong-Ahafo and Northern Ghana regions. A further office was subsequently opened in the regional administration offices in Tamale, capital of the Northern Region.

The archive is one of the institutions holding the records of the Dutch West India Company which have been added by UNESCO to its Memory of the World International Register as globally important documentary heritage.

== See also ==
- Unesco Memory of the World Register – Africa
- List of national archives

== Bibliography ==
- Dumett, R. E. Survey of Research Materials in the National Archives of Ghana at Google Books
