= Arolsen Archives =

German centre for research on Nazis and the Holocaust

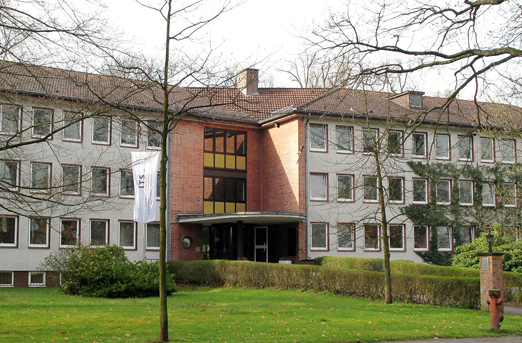
- The main building of the International Tracing Service
- Interactive map of Arolsen Archives
- 51.37821746260278°N 9.019545509244857°E
- Location: 5-9 Große Allee, Bad Arolsen, Hesse, Germany
- Affiliation: BArch
- Director: Moritz Wein
- Employees: c. 220
- Website: arolsen-archives.org

The Arolsen Archives: International Center on Nazi Persecution (formerly the International Tracing Service (ITS); German: Internationaler Suchdienst; French: Service International de Recherches) in Bad Arolsen, Germany, is an internationally governed centre for documentation, information and research on Nazi persecution, forced labour and the Holocaust in Nazi Germany and its occupied regions. The archive contains about 30 million documents from concentration camps, details of forced labour, and files on displaced persons. ITS preserves the original documents and clarifies the fate of those persecuted by the Nazis. The archives have been accessible to researchers since 2007. In May 2019 the Center uploaded around 13 million documents and made it available online to the public. The archives are currently being digitised and transcribed through the crowdsourcing platform Zooniverse. As of September 2022, approximately 46% of the archives have been transcribed.

== History ==
In 1943, the international section of the British Red Cross was asked by the Headquarters of the Allied Forces to set up a registration and tracing service for missing people. The organization was formalized under the Supreme Headquarters Allied Expeditionary Forces and named the Central Tracing Bureau on February 15, 1944. After the war the bureau was moved from London to Versailles, then to Frankfurt am Main, and finally to Bad Arolsen, which was considered a central location among the areas of Allied occupation and had an intact infrastructure unaffected by war.

On July 1, 1947, the International Refugee Organization took over administration of the bureau, and on January 1, 1948, the name was changed to International Tracing Service. In April 1951, administrative responsibilities for the service were placed under the Allied High Commission for Germany. When the status of occupation of Germany was repealed in 1954, the ICRC took over the administration of the ITS. The Bonn Agreement of 1955 (which stated that no data that could harm the former Nazi victims or their families should be published) and their amendment protocols dating from 2006 provided the legal foundation of the International Tracing Service. The daily operations were managed by a director appointed by the ICRC, who had to be a Swiss citizen. After some discussion, in 1990 the Federal Republic of Germany renewed its continuing commitment to funding the operations of the ITS. The documents in the ITS archives were opened to public access on November 28, 2007.

Tracing missing persons, clarifying people's fates, providing family members with information, also for compensation and pension matters, have been the principal tasks of the ITS since its beginning. Since the opening of the archives, new tasks such as research and education and the archival description of the documents gain more importance in relation to the tasks of tracing and clarifying fates. Since these new activities are not part of its humanitarian mission, the ICRC withdrew from the management of the ITS in December 2012. The Bonn Agreement was replaced on December 9, 2011, when the eleven member states of the International Commission signed two new agreements in Berlin on the future tasks and management of the ITS.

The ITS was founded as an organization dedicated to finding missing persons, typically lost to family and friends as a result of war, persecution or forced labour during World War II. The service operates under the legal authority of the Berlin Agreements from December 2011 and is funded by the government of Germany. The German Federal Archives are the institutional partner for the ITS since January 2013.

== Organization ==
The organization is governed by an International Commission with representatives from Belgium, France, Germany, Greece, Israel, Italy, Luxembourg, Netherlands, Poland, United Kingdom, and the United States. The Commission draws up the guidelines for the work to be carried out by the ITS and monitors these in the interests of the former victims of persecution.

The director of the ITS is appointed by the International Commission and is accountable directly to the commission. Since January 2016, Floriane Azoulay is the director. There are about 220 staff employed by the ITS. The institution is funded by the German Federal Foreign Office.

== Application for information ==
=== Application forms ===
On November 28, 2007, the ITS archives were made broadly available to the general public. The ITS records may be consulted in person, or by mail, telephone, fax or e-mail; addresses and contact numbers are available on the ITS website. Inquiries can be submitted to the ITS using the online form on the organization's website. The archives are also open for research.

=== New obligations ===
After the end of the Second World War the main task of the ITS was initially to conduct a search for the survivors of Nazi persecution and their family-members. Today, this accounts for no more than about three percent of its work. However, a large number of new obligations have been taken on over the course of the decades.

These include certification of the forms persecution took, confirmation for pension and compensation payments, allowing victims and their family members to inspect copies of the original documents and enabling the following generations to find out what happened to their forebears.

=== Answers ===
More than 70 years after the end of World War II, the ITS receives more than 1,000 inquiries every month from all around the world. Most of them now come from younger generations who are seeking information about the fate of their family members. In 2015, the ITS received around 15,500 requests regarding the fate of 21,909 persons from survivors, family members or researchers.

During the compensation phase of Eastern European forced labourers through the "Remembrance, Responsibility and Future" Foundation between 2000 and 2007, around 950,000 enquiries were sent to the Tracing Service. As a result of this flood of enquiries, the ITS was tremendously over-extended. Consequently, this created a gigantic backlog, which temporarily did considerable damage to the standing of the institution. Especially enquiries, which had no direct bearing on the foundation, remained unprocessed.

== The archives ==
=== Inventory ===
ITS's total inventory comprises 26,000 linear metres of original documents from the Nazi era and post-war period, 232,710 meters of microfilm and more than 106,870 microfiches. Work is under way to digitize the files, both for purposes of easier search and for preserving the historical record. Since 2015, the digitized material is gradually being published on the archive's Digital Collection Online platform.

The inventory is split up into three main areas: incarceration, forced labour and displaced persons. The variety of documents is enormous. They include list material and individual documents, such as registration cards, transport lists, records of deaths, questionnaires, labour passports, health insurance and social insurance documents. Among the documents are also examples of prominent victims of Nazi persecution like Anne Frank and Elie Wiesel.

In addition to this there are smaller sections associated with the work of a tracing service: the alphabetical-phonetic Central Name Index, the child search archives and the correspondence files. The Central Name Index represents the key to the documents. With 50 million references on the fate of over 17.5 million people, it is based on an alphabetic-phonetic filing system that was developed especially for ITS.

=== Finding aids ===
Making the inventory researchable for all historical issues is an urgent responsibilities after opening the archives. To date, the arrangement of the documents having been collected over a period of six decades was subject to the requirements of a tracing service, which brought families together and clarified the fates of individuals. The Central Name Index was the key to the documents, while the documents were arranged according to victim groups.

This principle no longer is sufficient, since historians ask not only for names, but also for topics, events, locations or nationalities. The goal is to compile finding aids that can be accessed and published online and are based on international archival standards. The first series of inventories could be published on the Internet (for the time being in the German language only). The documents were indexed according to their origin and content. In view of the volume of the documents to be described, this process will take some years.

=== Copies made available ===
The International Commission at its May 2007 meeting approved the US Holocaust Memorial Museum's proposal to permit advance distribution of the material, as it is digitized, to the designated repository institutions prior to the completion of the agreement ratification process officially opening the material. In August 2007, the USHMM received the first installment of records and in November 2007, received the Central Name Index. Materials will continue to be received as they are digitized.

One institution is designated for each of the 11 countries to receive a copy of the archive. The following locations have been designated by their respective countries.

- United States - United States Holocaust Memorial Museum
- Israel - Yad Vashem
- Poland - Institute of National Remembrance
- Luxembourg - Centre de Documentation et de Recherche sur la Resistance
- Belgium - National Archives of Belgium
- France - French National Archives (Archives Nationales)
- United Kingdom - The Wiener Library for the Study of the Holocaust & Genocide

On May 21, 2019, millions of digitized documents were made available online. The Archives of the International Tracing Service were added to the UNESCO Memory of the World register in 2013.

=== Other specialised archives ===
Archives on the fate of prisoners of war exist in Geneva at the ICRC, Central Tracing Agency. Inquiries are addressed.

Other archives deal with missing Germans on occasion of flight and expulsion and with missing German Wehrmacht soldiers. German Red Cross searches for German missing persons except those who were prosecuted by Nazi regime. Kirchlicher Suchdienst has knowledge on population of former eastern regions of Germany. Deutsche Dienststelle (WASt) has the archives of Wehrmacht soldiers killed in action. German War Graves Commission has an online inventory of war graves.

== Controversy ==
The ITS had been criticized before 2008 for refusing to open its archives to the public. The ITS, backed by the German government, had cited German archival law to support their position. The laws mandate a 100-year gap between releasing records in order to protect privacy. However, their critics argued that the ITS as such is not subject to German law. One accusation raised against Germany and the ITS by critics was that the archive was kept closed out of a desire to repress information about the Holocaust.

Critics cited the fact that all eleven governments sitting on the International Commission of the ITS endorsed the Stockholm International Forum Declaration of January 2000, which included a call for the opening of various Holocaust-era archives. However, since the Declaration was made, there had been little practical change in the operations of the ITS, despite repeated negotiations among the ITS, ICRC, and various Jewish and Holocaust survivor advocacy groups. A critical press release from the United States Holocaust Memorial Museum written in March 2006 charged that "In practice, however, the ITS and the ICRC have consistently refused to cooperate with the International Commission board and have kept the archive closed." In early 2006, several newspaper articles also raised questions about the quality of the ITS' management and the underlying reasons for the existing backlog.

In May 2006, the International Commission for the ITS decided to open the archives and documents for researchers' use, and to transfer, upon request, one copy of the ITS archives and documents to each one of its member states. This took place once all 11 countries ratified the new ITS Protocol. On November 28, 2007, it was announced that Greece, as the last of the member countries, filed its ratification papers with the German Foreign Ministry. It was then announced that the documents in the archive were open to public access.

== Covert role in Cold War ==
Associated Press (AP) reporters who were given access to ITS files found a carton of documents related to an escapee program run by the Truman Administration. The AP reporters used these files and declassified US documents to describe how the United States asked the ITS to run background checks on escapees from Eastern Europe. The Central Intelligence Agency reviewed their histories and then recruited some of them to return to their countries of origin, to spy for the United States. The program did not return very much useful intelligence, because these recruits, motivated to impress their handlers, supplied information that was not reliable, and because by 1952, the Soviets had largely exposed these efforts. Many recruits disappeared, presumed dead.

== School projects ==
A group of students participated from 2013 to 2014 in the project "DENK MAL – Erinnerung im öffentlichen Raum" at the school. The students, including the author Tariq Abo Gamra, erected a plaque at the entrance of the school in remembrance of the murdered and prosecuted Jewish students in Nazi Germany. A commemoration ceremony took place on November 10, 2014. The project received letters from German Chancellor Angela Merkel and the German President Joachim Gauck congratulating them. The project was supported by the International Tracing Service.
