= Maurice Lugeon =

Swiss geologist (1870–1953)

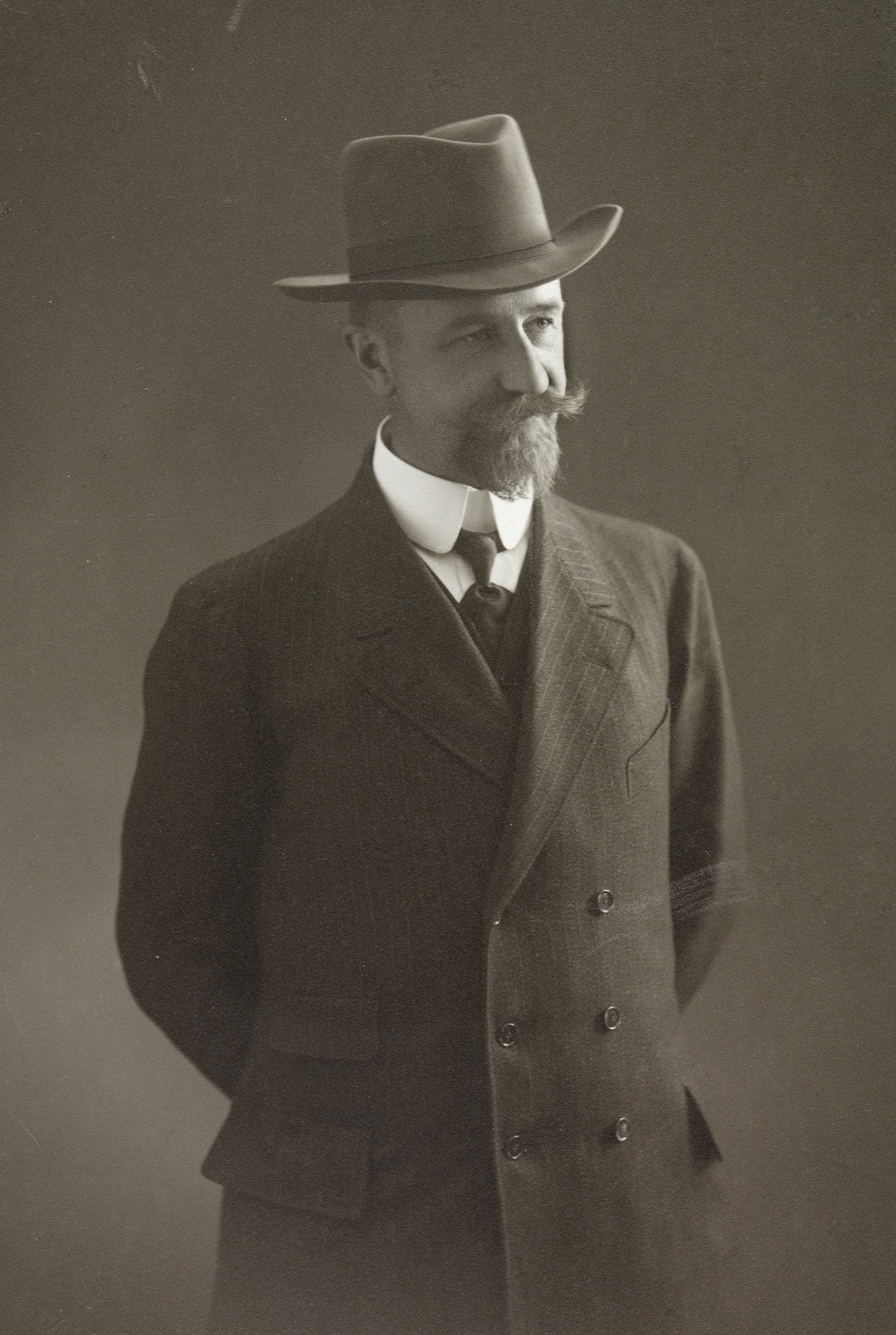
- Maurice Lugeon
- Born: 10 July 1870
- Died: 23 October 1953 (aged 83)
- Known for: nappe tectonics
- Awards: Marcel Benoist Prize (1932); Wollaston Medal (1938); Fellow of the Royal Society; Gustav-Steinmann-Medaille (1949)
- Scientific career
- Fields: geology

Maurice Lugeon FRS(For) HFRSE FGS (10 July 1870 – 23 October 1953) was a Swiss geologist, and the pioneer of nappe tectonics. He was a pupil of Eugène Renevier. Named for Maurice Lugeon, the lugeon is a measure of transmissivity in rocks, determined by pressurized injection of water through a bore hole driven through the rock. One Lugeon (Lu) is equivalent to one litre of water per minute, injected into 1 metre of borehole at an injection pressure of 10 atmospheres.

== Life ==
He was born in Poissy near Paris on 10 July 1870. His family moved to Lausanne in Switzerland in 1876. From the age of 15 he showed a strong interest in geology.

He spent most of his academic life at the University of Lausanne becoming Professor of Geology in 1906. He retired in 1940. He became an expert on dam locations and was consulted widely on this.

He died in Lausanne in Switzerland on 23 October 1953.

== Publications ==
- Dams and Geology (1933)

== Family ==
He was married to Ida Welti.
