= AUC Libraries and Learning Technologies =

Library in New Cairo, Egypt

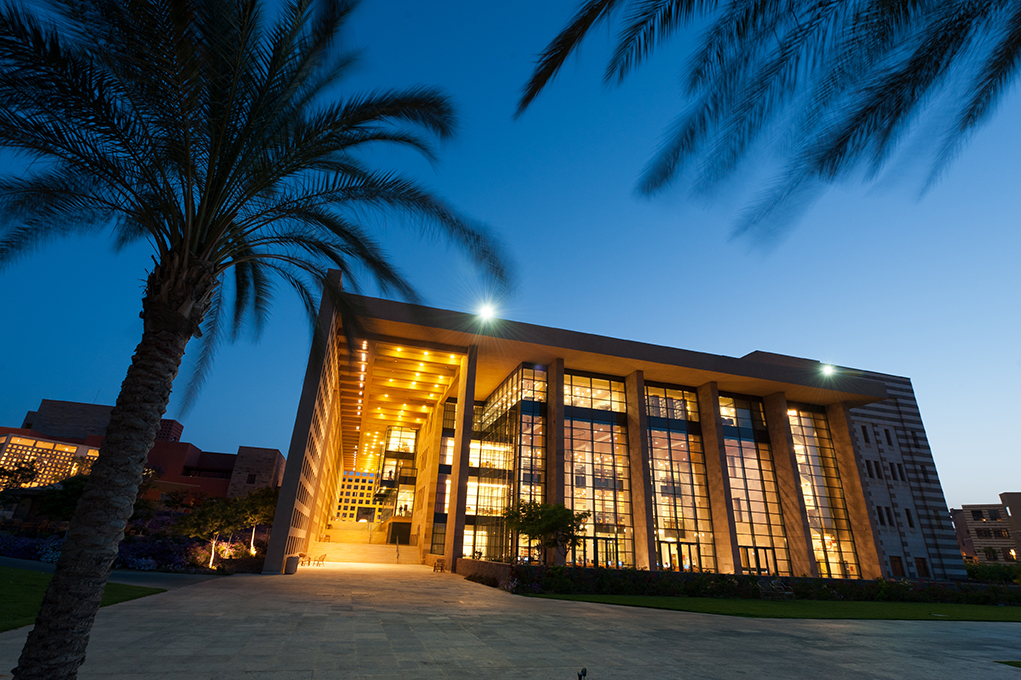
- AUC Library on the New Cairo campus, in 2014
- Location in New Cairo
- 30°01′12″N 31°30′01″E
- Location: New Cairo, Egypt, Egypt
- Type: Academic library
- Established: 1922
- Branches: 30.020118°N 31.500185°E New Campus location, 5th Settlement, New Cairo; 30.042783°N 31.236692°E Old Campus location, Tahrir Square, Cairo

Collection
- Items collected: Books, journals, databases, official publications, sheet music, sound and music recordings, maps, postage stamps, prints, architectural drawings, manuscripts, ephemera, films and photographs.
- Size: 480,000

Access and use
- Access requirements: AUC members & visiting scholars. Faculty, PhD & MA students at national universities may register.

Other information
- Director: Shahira El Sawy
- Website: library.aucegypt.edu

AUC Libraries and Learning Technologies (LLT) is the main library of the American University in Cairo. It is located on the University’s New Campus, in New Cairo, Egypt.

LLT is composed of several units: the Main Library, the Rare Books and Special Collections Library (RBSCL; includes University Archives and Records Management), and the Center for Learning and Teaching (CLT).

Together, these units form one of the largest, and most important academic research libraries in Egypt . Despite its physical location in Egypt, the American University of Cairo is accredited in the United States by the Middle States Commission of Higher Education (formerly a part of MSA); the School of Libraries and Learning Technologies therefore implements US standards and practices in all aspects of its work.

AUC Libraries and Learning Technologies is a member of the Association of College and Research Libraries, a division of the American Library Association (ALA), a member of the Center for Research Libraries’ Global Resources Network, and a member of IFLA. It is also a member of the AMICAL Consortium, and participates in OCLC’s resource-sharing programs ILLiad and SHARES.

As of February 2015, its holdings include some 70,000 electronic journals in over 138 databases; over 480,000 volumes of printed books (of which: 348,453 volumes in English, 102,655 volumes in Arabic, 26,657 volumes in French, 6,071 volumes in German, in addition to minor holdings in other languages). The Libraries also provides access to over 250,000 e-book titles, and several thousand titles in theses, maps, microforms, and audiovisual materials.

The Libraries are open to all AUC faculty members, students and staff. Visiting researchers whose work requires use of the collections are also admitted.

== History ==
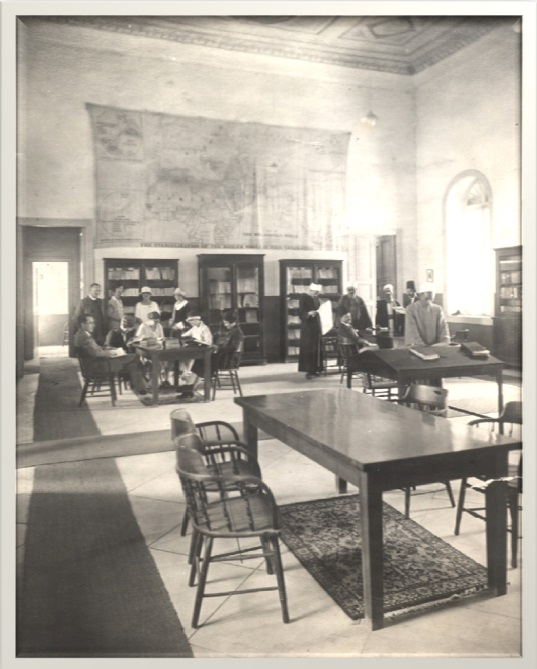
Reading room, School of Oriental Studies, AUC, in 1922

By 1922, three years after its founding, AUC had a small reading room as part of the School of Oriental Studies at the Tahrir Campus. In 1959, the Library was moved to Hill House and managed by faculty librarians and staff. The collection comprised primarily English and Arabic titles. In 1973, the Library created the first computerized serials holdings list. The collection was reclassified from the Dewey Decimal system to the Library of Congress call number system between 1972 and 1975. In 1982, the Main Library moved into a new purpose-built facility on the Greek Campus (a plot on the corner of Muhammad Mahmoud and Yousuf Elguindi Streets, originally belonging to the Greek community). In 1986, the Library implemented one of the first online catalogs in the Middle East through the German-Belgian Dobis/Libis system.

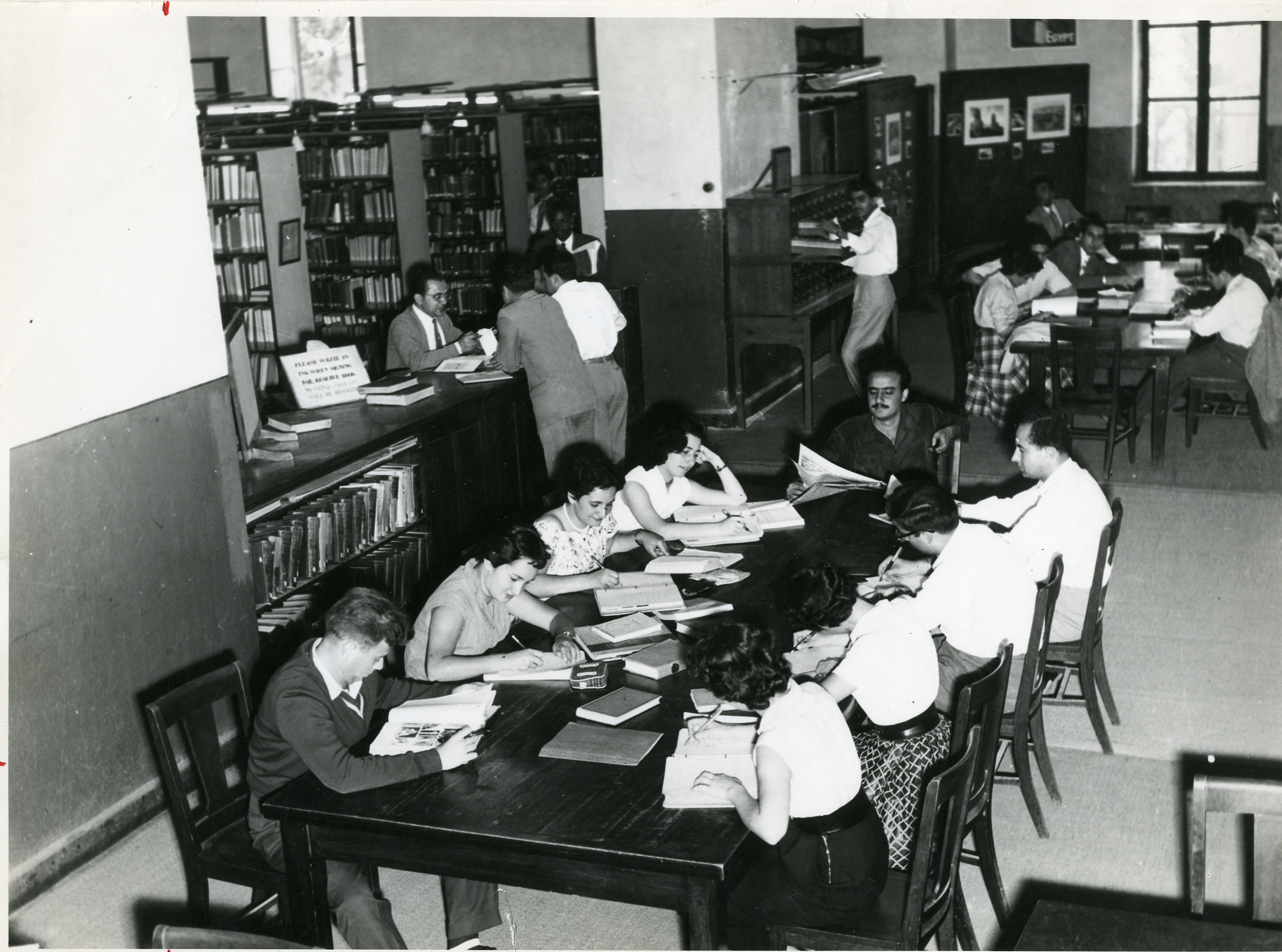
Interior view of the Library in Hill House, Tahrir Campus, in 1955

In 1995, the Main Library was the first in the region to create a department of Information Literacy, and more faculty members were added as services were expanded to meet the specialized needs of new academic departments and developing technologies. The year 1990 saw the inauguration of the Rare Books and Special Collections Library. In 1998, the Director of the Library was elevated to the rank of Dean. Shortly thereafter, in 2000, the Library was merged with the Departments of Media Services, Academic Computing, and Web Communications. The Centre for Learning and Teaching was inaugurated in the 2002. In the summer of 2008, Libraries and Learning Technologies moved from downtown Cairo to its present location on the University’s new 265-acre campus in New Cairo.

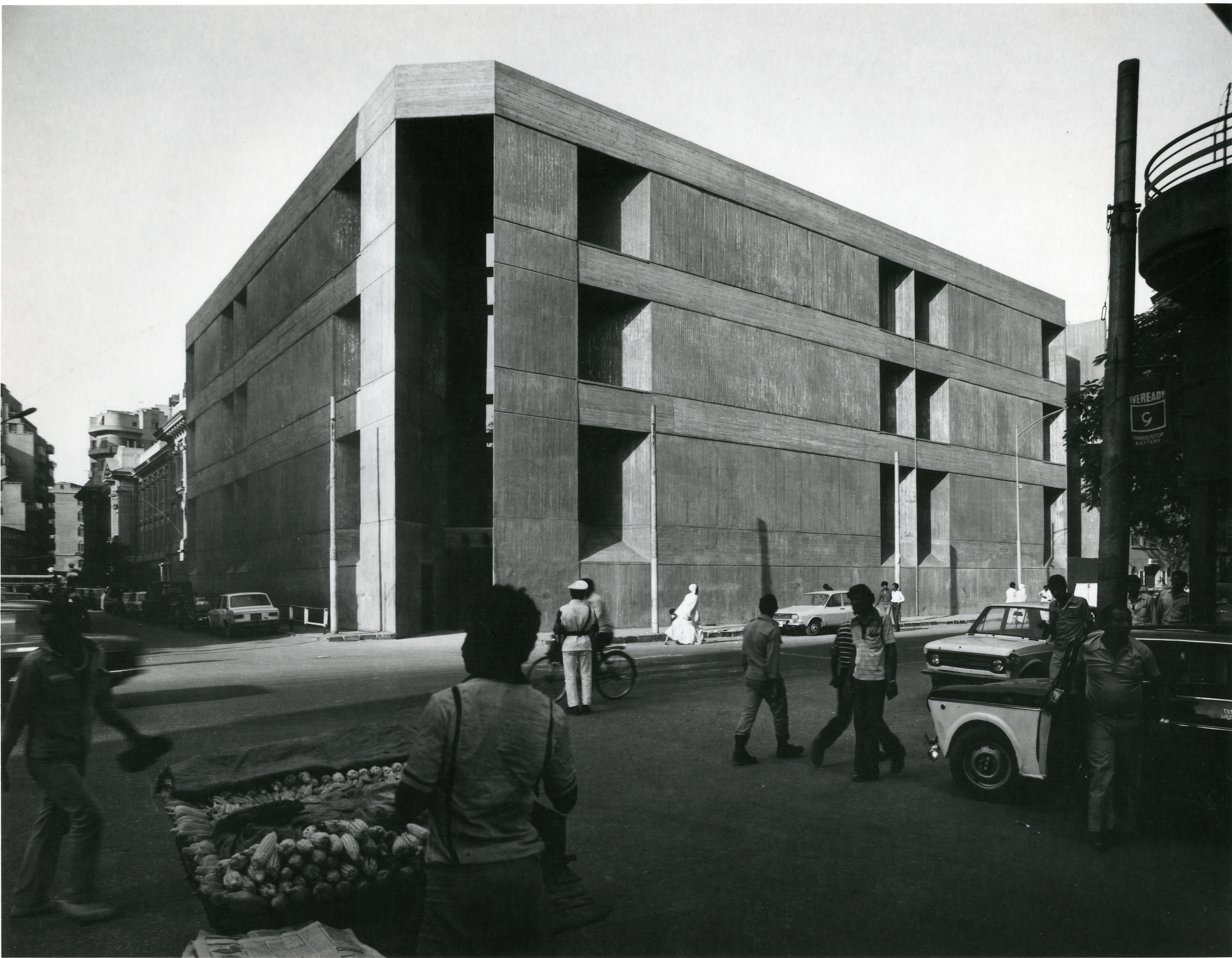
AUC Library on the Greek Campus, downtown Cairo, in 1981

=== Chronological list of deans and directors ===
- Gamal ed-Din Hafaz Awad - Librarian, 1922-1923
- Helen Flinn - Librarian, 1928-1931
- Hughes Gibbons - Librarian, 1932-1937
- Worth C. Howard - University Librarian, 1940-1955
- George Henry Gardner - University Librarian, 1955-1959
- Sayed Mahmoud Sheniti - University Librarian, 1957-1962
- Florence Ljunggren - University Librarian, 1962-1966
- Frederick Arnold - University Librarian, 1966-1967
- James Van Luik - Library Director, 1967-1970
- Grace Larudee - Library Director, 1969-1971
- Everett Moore - Library Director, 1971-1973
- Jesse Duggan - Library Director, 1973-1985
- Smith Richardson - Library Director, 1986-1989
- Kenneth Oberembt - Director of Library and Media Services, 1990-1995
- Shahira El Sawy - Director of Library and Media Services, 1995-1998; Dean, Libraries and Learning Technologies, 1998-2018
- Lamia Eid - Interim Dean of Libraries and Learning Technologies 2018-2020
- Daniel Ortiz - Dean of Libraries and Learning Technologies 2020- 2023
- Lamia Eid - Dean of Libraries and Learning Technologies 2023 -

== Units ==
=== Main Library ===
The Main Library consists of the following units:

- Automated Systems (Library IT support and development)
- Collections (management physical, and electronic collections)
- Public Services (user education and patron services)

=== Rare Books and Special Collections Library (RBSCL) ===
AUC’s Rare Books and Special Collections Library (RBSCL) was created in 1992, the combination of the Main Library’s Special Collections unit which maintained university archives and assorted rare books and maps, and the library of the university’s Center for Arabic Studies, focused on Islamic art and architecture. These libraries had been brought together in a restored 19th-century villa at the downtown Tahrir Square campus, but the RBSCL moved with most of the university to a new campus in the suburbs of Cairo after 2009. During the Egyptian Revolution of 2011, the Library's staff and preservation experts helped save some of the contents of the Library of the nearby Institut d'Égypte.

This unit of LLT comprises several sections. It maintains the Digital Archive and Research Repository, and RBSCL Digital Library, where some of its holdings are made available to the public. It also archives websites through the ArchiveIt we archiving subscription service by the Internet Archive.

==== Rare Books ====
The Rare Books and Special Collections Library’s collections were built largely through the acquisition or donation of the private libraries of several collectors, among them K.A.C. Creswell, Max Debbane, Labib Habachi, and Selim Hassan. Their chief areas of interest - Islamic art and architecture, Egyptology, and travel literature - make up the core of the Library's collections.

In addition to the collectors above, the Library has acquired works from scholars and bibliophiles like Mahmoud Saba, Esmat Allouba, Constant DeWitt, Charles Issawi, and Charles Hedlund, Charles Faltas, Muhammad Shawqi Mustafa, and Fr. Pierre Riches. In recent years, the Library has received the libraries of public figures, such as Anis Mansour and Boutros Boutros-Ghali (2013).

Among the library's rare book holdings are the monumental Description de l'Égypte and multiple volumes of the lithographs of artist David Roberts' paintings of Egypt and the Levant.

==== Special Collections ====
In the mid-1990s, the library began to acquire collections of personal papers, like those of Egypt’s leading 20th century architect Hassan Fathy. From that time the library made steady acquisitions of archival resources documenting the artistic, cultural, intellectual, political, and social life of modern Egypt. Holdings include the private papers of pioneering Egyptian feminist Huda Sha'arawi, the writings of Egyptian journalist Anis Mansour, the papers of Coptic musicologist Ragheb Moftah.

Photography, including numerous images of the architecture and landscape of Egypt dating to the late 19th century, represents another core holdings area. Key collections of photographs include the prints depicting Islamic architecture produced and collected by K.A.C. Creswell, and the photographic archive of Egypt’s most prominent 20th century studio and art photographer, Van Leo.

==== University Archives & Records Management ====
The University Archives document the AUC’s history, mission, and activities, through materials in a variety of formats, dating to the early 20th century. AUC Records Management assists University offices in handling their inactive records. The unit also maintains an online archive of web content from Egypt.

==== Regional Architecture Center ====
The Rare Books and Special Collections Library began collecting architectural archives with the acquisition of the corpus of the work of Hassan Fathy, Egypt’s leading 20th century architect, in 1994. In subsequent years the library acquired the collections of other leading Egyptian architects like Hassan Fathy, Ramses Wissa Wassef, Sayed Karim, Ahmad Hamid, and Gamal Bakry. Preservation and processing of collections like these were supported by grants from the Getty Grant Foundation and U.S. National Endowment for the Humanities.

==== Center for Excellence for the Middle East and Arab Cultures (CEMEAC) ====
The Center supports advanced scholarly research by building on strengths of the outstanding existing collections in Arabic and Middle Eastern studies.

=== Center for Learning and Teaching ===
The Center for Learning and Teaching (CLT) promotes excellence in teaching, including the effective application of technology to the teaching/learning process. Together with other institutional partners, CLT promotes open access to scholarship.
