= Public Records and Archives Administration Department =

Public Records and Archives Administration Department (PRAAD) is the organisation which takes care of public records, archives and documents in Ghana. This department took over the role of the National Archive of Ghana in 1997.

Concerns were raised in 2015 that insufficient funding meant that there were significant risks of the loss of vital national records in the event of natural disaster or human error.

In 2022 a report by Angela Berkoh (PRAAD), Harry Akussah (University of Ghana) and Noah Darko-Adjei (University of Ghana) was published which provided a feasibility study for the establishment of a digital repository at PRAAD.
