= Memory of the World Programme =

UNESCO initiative to preserve heritage

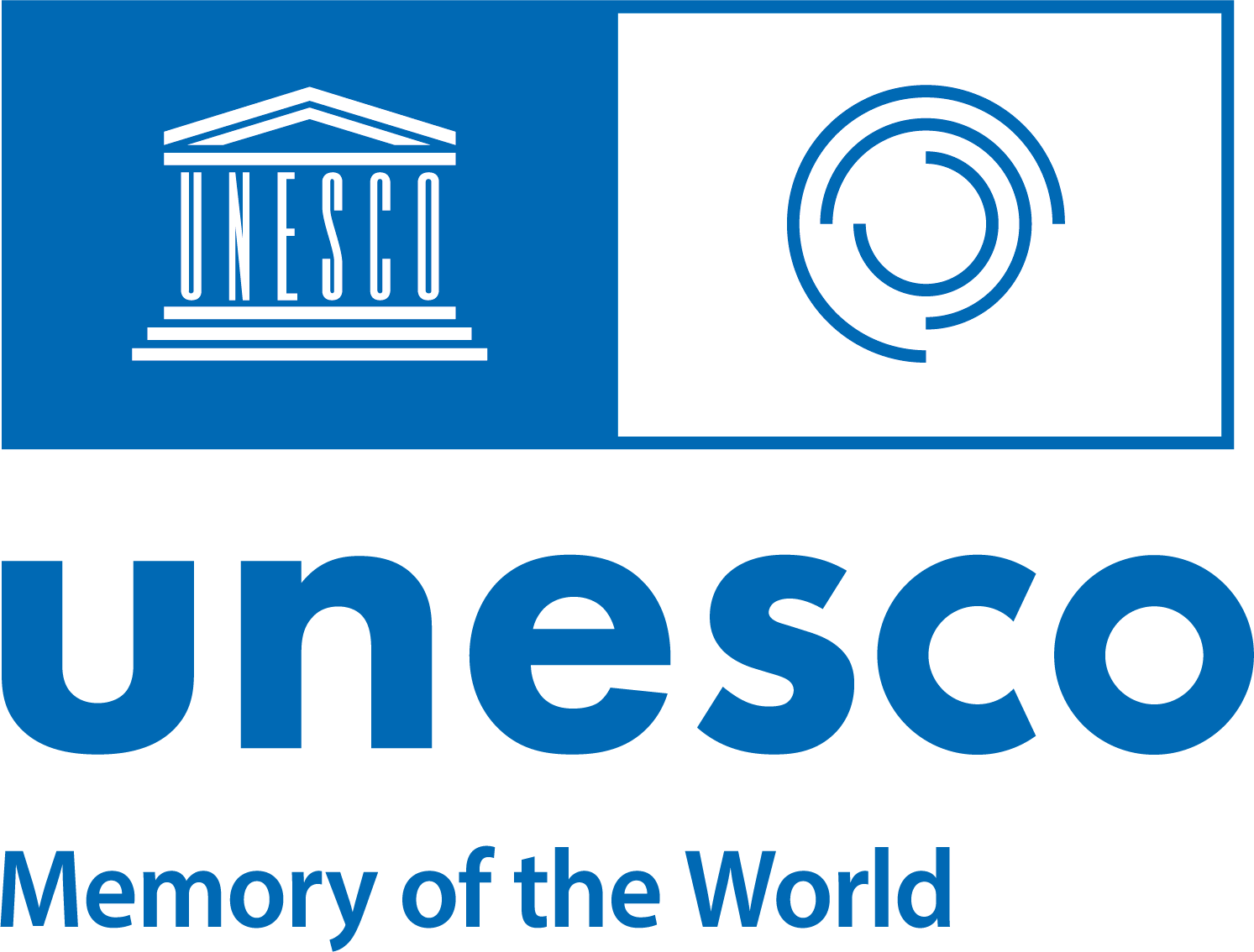
Logo of the Memory of the World Programme

UNESCO's Memory of the World (MoW) Programme is an international initiative that recognises documentary heritage of global importance. It aims to safeguard the documentary heritage of humanity against collective amnesia, neglect, decay over time and climatic conditions, as well as deliberate destruction. It calls for the preservation of valuable archival holdings, library collections, and private individual compendia all over the world for posterity and increased accessibility to, and public awareness of, these items.

Following the establishment of the Memory of the World International Register, UNESCO and the Memory of the World Programme have encouraged the creation of autonomous national and regional committees as well as national and regional registers which focus on documentary heritage of great regional or national importance, but not necessarily of global importance.

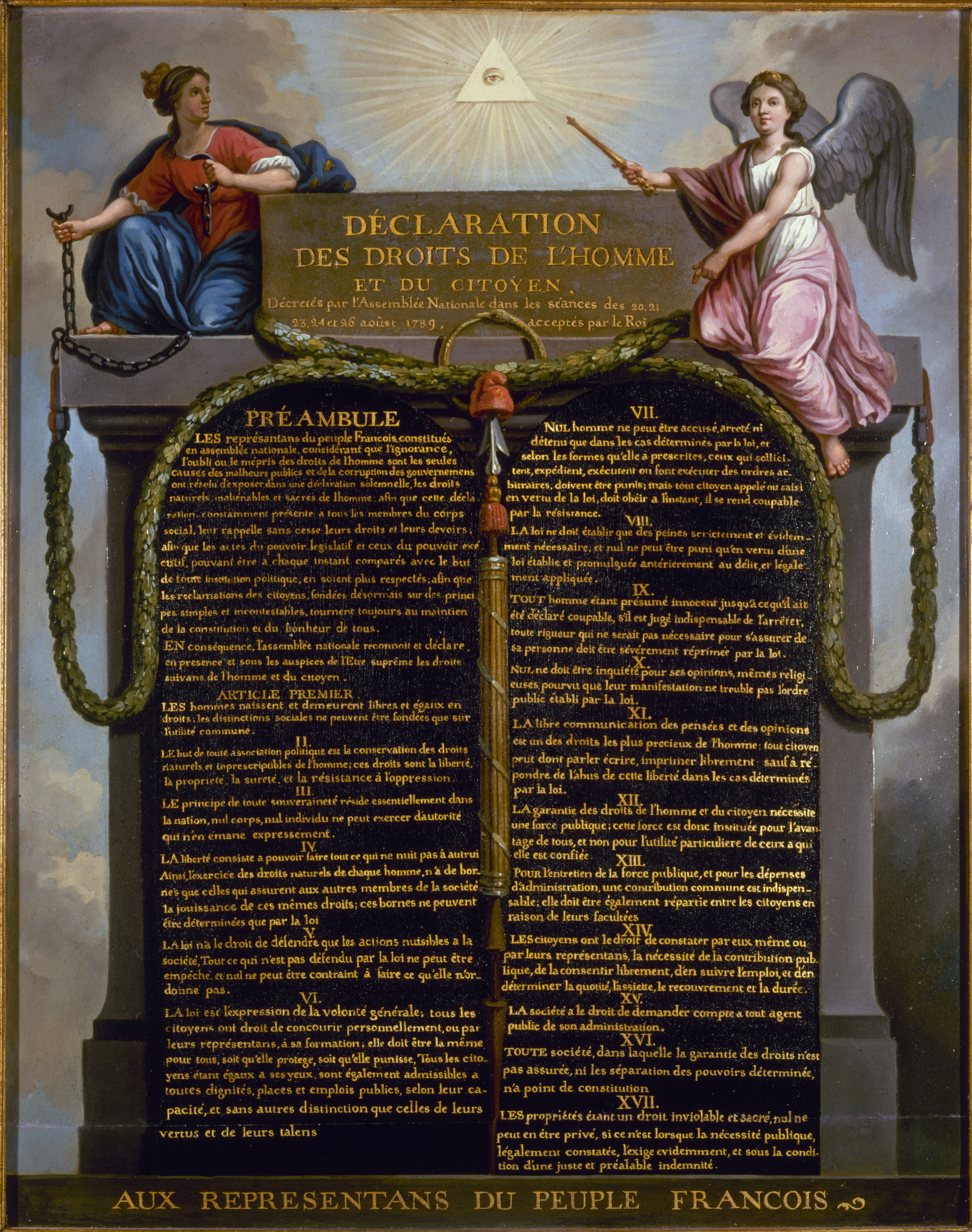
The Declaration of the Rights of Man and of the Citizen (1789) was used to disseminate to the political community the first French Constitution.

== Memory of the World International Register ==
The Memory of the World International Register is a list of the world's documentary heritage with outstanding global significance – such as manuscripts, oral traditions, audio-visual materials, and library and archive holdings. It catalogues documentary heritage that has been recommended by the International Advisory Committee and endorsed by the Director-General of UNESCO, using the selection criteria "world significance and outstanding universal value." As well as raising awareness of this heritage, the register aims to promote its preservation, digitization, and dissemination by calling upon the programme's networks of experts. The program also uses technology to provide wider accessibility and diffusion of information about the items inscribed on the register.

The first inscriptions on the International Register were made in 1997. The various properties in the register include recordings of folk music; ancient languages and phonetics; aged remnants of religious and secular manuscripts; collective lifetime works of renowned giants of literature; science and music; copies of landmark motion pictures and short films; and accounts documenting changes in the world's political, economic, and social stage.

As of April 2025, 570 pieces of documentary heritage had been inscribed in the International Register. The register is divided into five regional groups, and some inscriptions relate to international organisations. An inscription can be associated with more than one region if multiple countries are involved in its nomination.

Region	Number of inscriptions to the Register
Memory of the World Register in Africa	41
Memory of the World Register in Arab States	24
Memory of the World Register in Asia and the Pacific	180
Memory of the World Register in Europe and North America	315
Memory of the World Register in Latin America and the Caribbean	83
Memory of the World Register of International Organizations	10

=== Top 10 countries by number of inscriptions ===
Rank	Country	Number of inscriptions
1	Germany	33
2	United Kingdom	27
3=	Netherlands	26
3=	France	26
5	South Korea	21
6	Poland	19
7	China	18
8=	Spain	16
8=	Russia	16
8=	Indonesia	16

=== Process ===
Any organization or individual can nominate a documentary item for inscription on the International Register via UNESCO Member States through their National Commission for UNESCO. In the absence of a National Commission, the nomination is sent through the relevant government body in charge of relations with UNESCO, involving, if one exists, the relevant national MoW committee. Two proposals per UNESCO Member State are considered in each nomination cycle. There is no limit on joint nomination proposals from two or more UNESCO Member States.

The program is administered by the International Advisory Committee (IAC), whose 14 members are appointed by the Director-General of UNESCO. During its meetings, the IAC examines the full documentation of the item's description, origin, world significance, contemporary state of conservation and other criteria for admissibility. The IAC recommends to the Executive Board of UNESCO the items proposed for inscription. The IAC is responsible for the formulation of major policies, including the technical, legal and financial framework for the program. It also maintains several subsidiary bodies:

- Bureau: Maintains an overview of the Programme between IAC meetings and makes tactical decisions in liaison with the Secretariat, reviews the use of the Memory of the World logo, and liaises with national Memory of the World committees and monitors their growth and operation.
- The Preservation Sub-Committee: Develops, regularly revises and promulgates information guides on the preservation of documentary heritage, and offers advice on technical and preservation matters.
- Register Sub-Committee: Oversees the assessment of nominations for the Memory of the World International Register and provides recommendations, with reasons, for their inscription or rejection to each meeting of the IAC.
- Education and Research Sub-committee: Develops strategies and concepts for institutionalizing education and research on documentary heritage and helps developing innovative curricula and research on Memory of the World.
- The Secretariat at UNESCO: Provides support services to the International Advisory Committee (IAC) and its subsidiary bodies, and the general administration and monitoring of the Program. It is the contact point of the Program.
- The Memory of the World Programme is implemented by UNESCO through regional and national committees. These committees are autonomous from UNESCO and are composed of dedicated local heritage professionals.

== National and regional registers ==
Some national and regional Memory of the World committees maintain their own Memory of the World registers, highlighting documentary heritage of great national or regional importance. National registers include:

- Australian Memory of the World Register
- Memory of Austria
- Brazil Memory of the World Register
- Canada Memory of the World Register
- Finland Memory of the World
- Ghana Memory of the World Register
- Mexican National Register of the Memory of the World
- Netherlands Memory of the World
- New Zealand Memory of the World Register
- Norges dokumentarv (Norway)
- Philippines Memory of the World Register
- UK Memory of the World Register

There are presently three regional registers: the Asia Pacific Regional Register, the Register for Latin America and the Caribbean. and the African Regional Register. In the Asia-Pacific region, in 2014–2015, there were 18 member nations of MOWCAP (6 without national committees), while in 2016, there were 16 national MoW committees.

== Jikji Prize ==
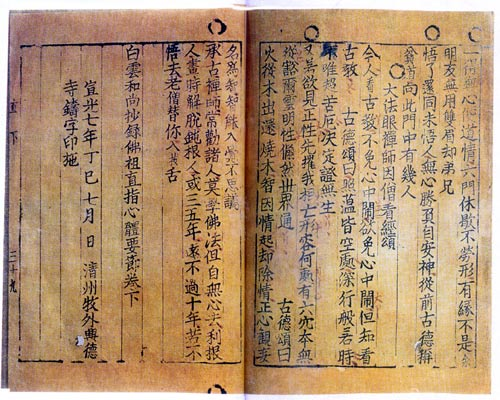
The Jikji, created in 1377, is the earliest known book printed with movable metal type.

The Jikji Prize was established in 2004 by UNESCO in cooperation with the South Korean government to further promote the objectives of the Memory of the World Programme, and to commemorate the 2001 inscription of the country's Jikji on the Register. The award, which includes a cash prize of $30,000 from the Korean government, recognizes institutions that have contributed to the preservation and accessibility of documentary heritage.

The prize has been awarded biannually since 2005 during the meeting of the IAC.

=== Recipients ===
- 2005: Czech National Library (Prague)
- 2007: Phonogrammarchiv of the Austrian Academy of Sciences
- 2009: National Archives of Malaysia (Kuala Lumpur)
- 2011: National Archives of Australia
- 2013: Apoyo al Desarrollo de Archivos y Bibliotecas (Mexico City)
- 2016: Iberarchivos Programme for the Development of Ibero-Ameran Archives
- 2018: SAVAMA-DCI (Mali)
- 2020: Tuol Sleng Genocide Museum (Cambodia)
- 2022: American University in Cairo's Libraries and Learning Technologies, Rare Books and Special Collection Library in Egypt
- 2024: National Library of Indonesia
- 2026: Abdul Latif Hashim and Haneen Al-Amassi

== Audiovisual heritage ==
UNESCO'S concern for audiovisual heritage within the MoW Programme originated the Recommendation for the Safeguarding and Preservation of Moving Images, adopted by the General Conference in October 1980. The recommendation acknowledged the rapid disappearance of film materials, with early cinema particularly affected: by the mid-1990s, more than three-quarters of the earliest film production had been lost. Films from as recently as 1990 required restoration. The document identified three periods of large-scale film loss linked to changes in taste or commercial interest: the destruction of early cinema, the transition from silent to sound film, and the replacement of nitrate stock with acetate base.

To mark the centenary of cinema (1895–1995), UNESCO's General Information Programme and UNISIST compiled Memory of the World: National Cinematic Heritage (CII.95/WS/7, Paris, September 1995). This was the first list published as part of the MoW Programme.

UNESCO contacted national film archives and similar institutions, requesting each to identify approximately fifteen films considered representative of their national cinematic heritage. Responses were received from fifty countries and territories: Angola, Australia, Austria, Bolivia, Brazil, Burkina Faso, Canada, Chile, China, Colombia, Côte d'Ivoire, the Czech Republic, Denmark, Ecuador, Egypt, Ethiopia, Finland, Germany, Greece, the Holy See, Hungary, India, Indonesia, Ireland, Israel, Italy, Kazakhstan, Laos, Lebanon, Mexico, New Zealand, Norway, Pakistan, Papua New Guinea, Peru, Poland, Portugal, Puerto Rico, the South Korea, Slovakia, Slovenia, Spain, Sweden, Switzerland, the Former Yugoslav Republic of Macedonia, Ukraine, the United States, Venezuela, and Yugoslavia.

== History ==
In 1992, the program began as a way to preserve and promote documentary heritage, manuscripts, maps, rock inscriptions, court documents, diplomatic exchanges and more that are deemed to be of such global significance as to transcend the boundaries of time and culture. This recorded memory reflects the diversity of languages, people, and cultures. UNESCO, the world agency responsible for the protection of the world's cultural and natural heritage, realized the need to protect such fragile yet important component of cultural heritage. The Memory of the World Programme was established to facilitate the preservation of, universal access to, and public awareness about humanity's documentary heritage.

People the world over are creating [memories] in forms that are less and less permanent—be it sound recordings, film, videotape, newsprint, photographs, or computer-based documents. It must be said that the output of the present century alone is probably greater than the total output of all previous centuries put together; and ironically and tragically, it is being lost faster than ever before. It is a tragedy indeed, for what is at stake is the recorded memory of mankind.

— Dato' Habibah Zon, Director-General of the National Archives of Malaysia,

Regular meetings were held by the IAC in its interim capacity beginning in 1993, culminating in the creation of the Memory of the World International Register during its second meeting in 1995, with the first inscriptions on the register in 1997, after the statutes that created the IAC as a standing committee took effect.

=== Memory of the World IAC meetings ===
Biennial meetings of the International Advisory Committee are used to discuss and inscribe items onto the register. The meeting normally takes place in odd-numbered years:

IAC Session	Date	Site	IAC chairperson	Number of nominations evaluated	Number of inscriptions to the register	References
1st	1993; Sept 12–14	Pułtusk, Poland	Jean-Pierre Wallot (Canada)	none	none	
2nd	1995; May 3–5	Paris, France	Jean-Pierre Wallot (Canada)	none	none	
3rd	1997; Sept 29 – Oct 1	Tashkent, Uzbekistan	Jean-Pierre Wallot (Canada)	69	38	
Bureau Meeting	1998; Sept 4–5	London, United Kingdom	Jean-Pierre Wallot (Canada)	none	none	
4th	1999; Jun 10–12	Vienna, Austria	Bendik Rugaas (Norway)	20	9	
5th	2001; Jun 27–29	Cheongju, South Korea	Bendik Rugaas (Norway)	42	21	
6th	2003; Aug 28–30	Gdańsk, Poland	Ekaterina Genieva (Russian Federation)	41	23	
7th	2005; Jun 13–18	Lijiang, China	Deanna B. Marcum (US)	53	29	
8th	2007; Jun 1–15	Pretoria, South Africa	Alissandra Cummins (Barbados)	53	38	
9th	2009; Jul 27–31	Bridgetown, Barbados	Roslyn Russell (Australia)	55	35	
10th	2011; May 22–25	Manchester, United Kingdom	Roslyn Russell (Australia)	84	45	
11th	2013; Jun 18–21	Gwangju, South Korea	Helena R Asamoah-Hassan (Ghana)	84	56	
12th	2015; Oct 4–6	Abu Dhabi, United Arab Emirates	Abdulla El Reyes (United Arab Emirates)	86	44	
13th	2017; Oct 24–27	Paris, France	Abdulla El Reyes (United Arab Emirates)	132	78	
14th	2023; Mar 8–10, Apr 11	Paris, France + online	Abdulla El Reyes (United Arab Emirates)	88	64	
15th	2025; Feb 26–28	Paris, France	Joie Springer (Barbados)	122	74	

=== Controversy ===
During the 2013–2015 cycle, China's application concerning the Nanjing Massacre was accepted while the comfort women application was rejected. These decisions triggered diplomatic tensions, including Japan’s threat to suspend UNESCO funding and renewed efforts by South Korean and other Asian activists to resubmit the comfort women application in 2017. In 2017, the comfort women records jointly nominated by nine countries, including South Korea, China, Japan, and Taiwan, failed to be inscribed on UNESCO’s Memory of the World Register.

== See also ==
- Digital preservation
- Domesday Project
- National memory
- Project Gutenberg
- World Heritage Site
