= Lugeon =

A Lugeon is a unit devised to quantify the water permeability of bedrock and the hydraulic conductivity resulting from fractures; it is named after Maurice Lugeon, a Swiss geologist who first formulated the method in 1933. More specifically, the Lugeon test is used to measure the amount of water injected into a segment of the bored hole under a steady pressure; the value (Lugeon value) is defined as the loss of water in litres per minute and per metre borehole at an over-pressure of 1 MPa.

Although the Lugeon test may serve other purposes, its main object is to determine the Lugeon coefficient which by definition is water absorption measured in litres per metre of test-stage per minute at a pressure of 10 kg/cm^{2} (1 MN/m^{2}).
