= Documentary heritage =

Documentary heritage is a field of tangible and movable cultural heritage focused on the conservation and communication of documents of heritage interest such as bound volumes, works on paper, iconographic documents of varying media such as lithographs, engravings, and etchings, cartographic documents, and manuscripts, ephemera, and other unica. These documents and works can be of interest for display, scholarly research, and preservation for future generations, and can be preserved through preventative and interventionist conservation measures. The character of these documents can be of interest to the collective memory of a limited audience, such as a map of a 17th or 18th century region or city, or can be testamentary to a level of human creative genius with outstanding universal value, such as a collection of literature which exemplifies the humanist spirit of the European renaissance or the architectural drawings of a structure which influenced the spatial arrangements of buildings across multiple cultures and time periods.

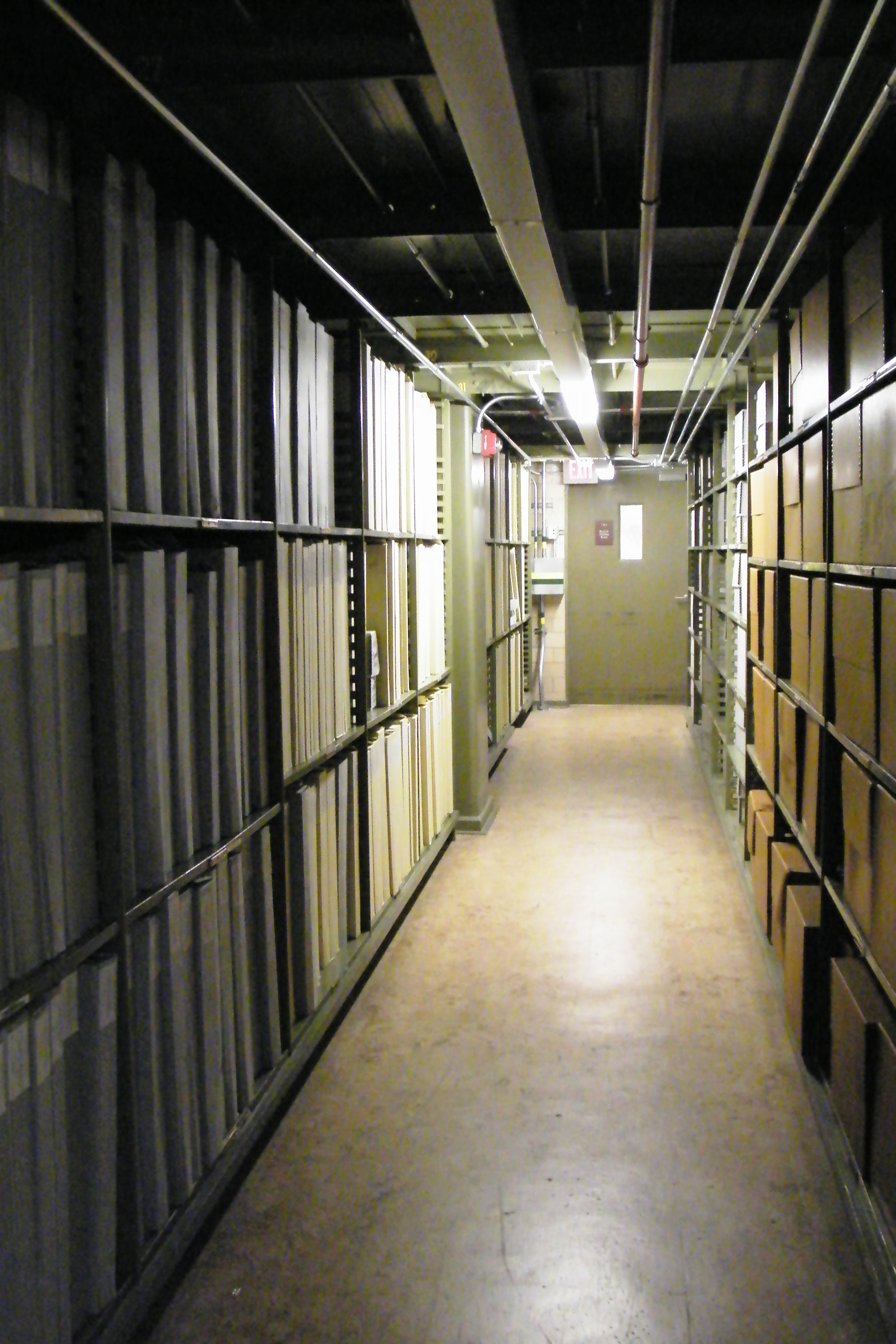
National Archives and Records Administration, Washington, D.C.

== Technical media ==
=== Bound volumes ===
Bound volumes consist of works on paper, parchment, or similar media enclosed within boards typically composed of vellum, leather, cloth, or similar materials bound together within a spine which forms the joints between the pages and boards. Two common forms of paper are laid paper and wove paper. Laid paper was the most common until about 1800 CE and was made from wood pulp which was formed within a wooden vat and drained through a wire mesh. This mesh consisted of a series of perpendicular wires which formed lines in the finished leaf of paper known as laid lines and chain lines. Laid paper is chemically stable due to its neutral pH and is comparatively resistant to dissolving when submerged in water. Wove paper was the most common from about 1800 CE and can be identified from its smooth surface which was woven from strands of wood pulp in a paper mill. Wove paper is chemically unstable when contrasted to laid paper due to its low pH and is more subject than laid paper to acidic burning and foxing. Its finely woven pattern also makes it thinner and easier to dissolve or warp in water when compared to laid paper.

=== Iconographic and cartographic documents ===
Iconographic and cartographic documents consist of individual leaves of paper or paper-like media, which contain images, maps, or similar depictions. The images can be applied to the media through a variety of printmaking processes such as lithography, engraving, and etching. In lithography, an image is applied to a stone with chemical properties that allow the image to be copied through a press onto a series of prints. In engraving, an image is carved into a copper or zinc plate with a burin, or pointed tool, which allows ink to be spread into the carved recesses of the plate and transferred onto the media, forming the image. In etching, an acid chemically bites into a ground mixture on the plate to form the recesses instead of mechanical carving with the burin, allowing for colored images to be applied to the media with the aid of hard and soft ground mixtures and multiple etching plates, each carved with different recesses to accommodate lines of varying colors applied to different locations on the media.

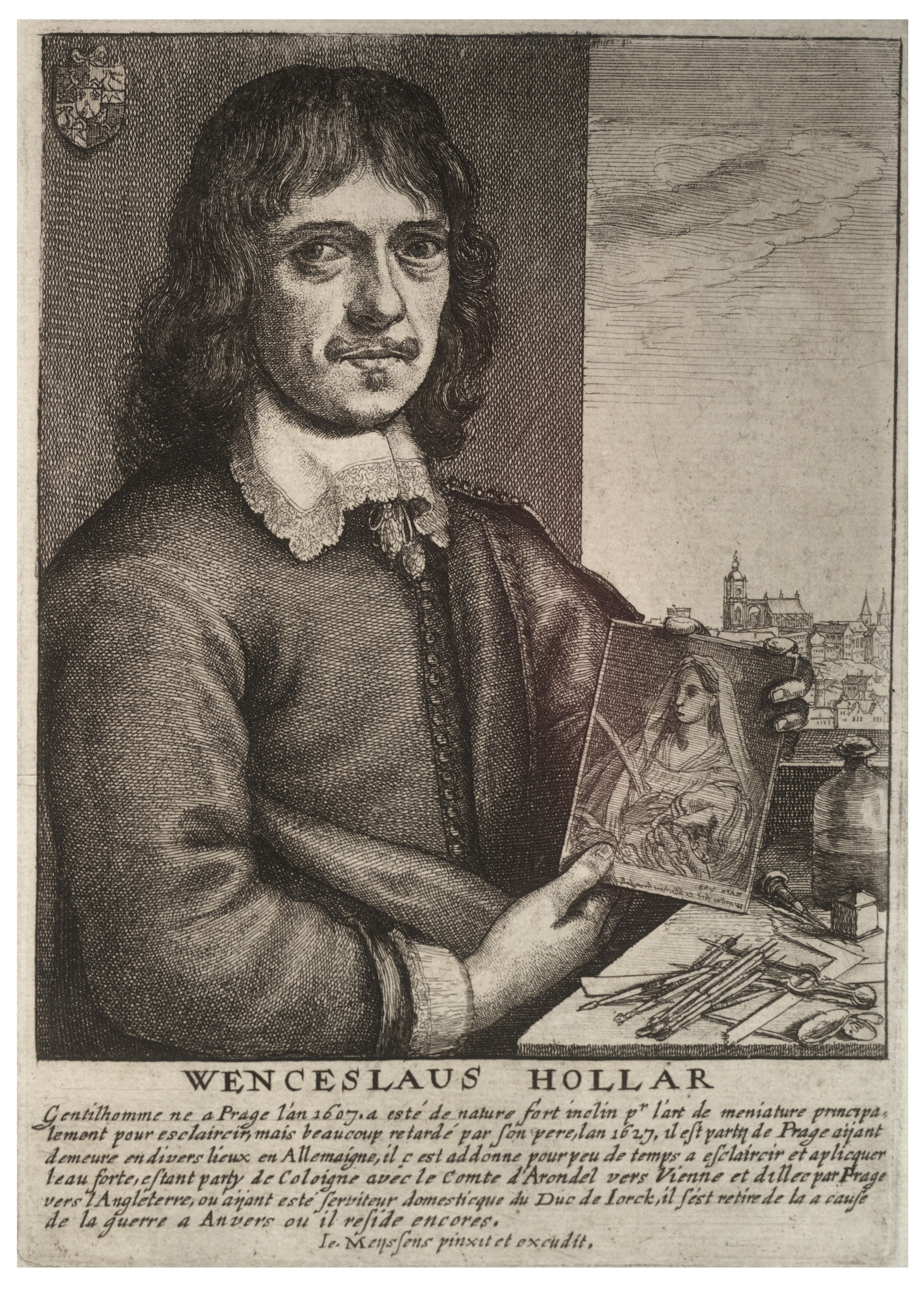
Wenceslaus Hollar etching

=== Manuscripts ===
Manuscripts are documents which can consist of bound volumes or individual leaves, in which each example was copied or drawn without the aid of mechanical processes such as printing presses or printmaking techniques. Because no two manuscripts are copied in an identical fashion, manuscripts are considered to constitute unica, meaning that there can be no more than one identical example of each extant document. Common features for longer manuscripts include capitulation, in which the content of the manuscript is organized into chapters grouped under headings, and rubrication, in which the chapter headings are drawn in red for added differentiation from the body of the black text block.

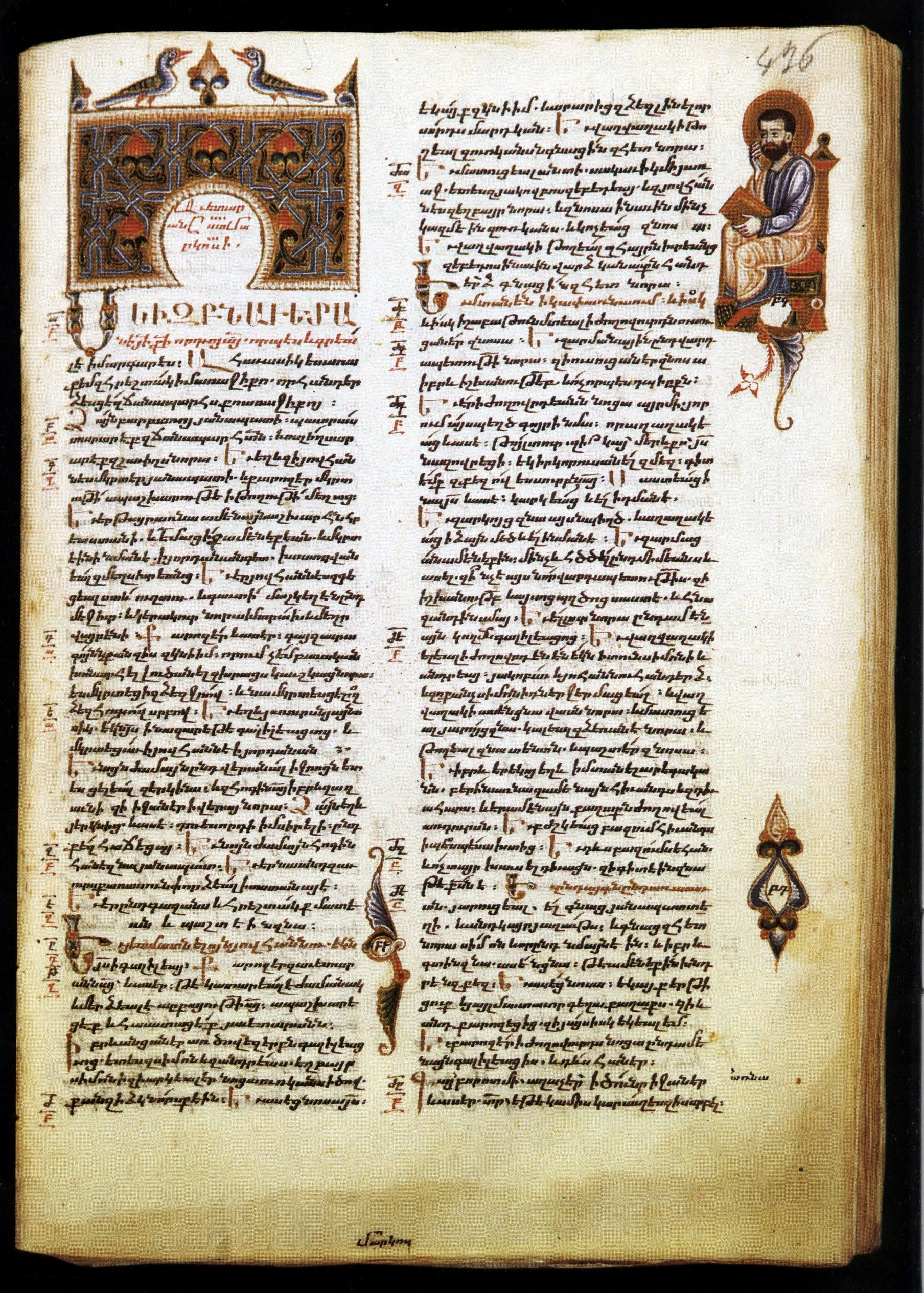
Armenian Manuscript with Capitulation and Rubrication

== Preventative conservation methods ==
=== Consistency of temperature and relative humidity ===
Heritage documents are best conserved in an environment with a stable temperature and relative humidity. Fluctuations in climatic conditions associated with attics, basements, and restrooms can facilitate a poor state of preservation due to the chemical and physical weaknesses of the media, such as expansion and contraction of joints, leaves, and attachment points. Humid environments also contribute to the spread of chemical threats to the integrity of the documents such as mold and red rot, which are often irreversible and pose a threat to the integrity and safety of heritage collections and handlers. Thermometers and hygrometers designed for use around documentary heritage materials can be obtained relatively inexpensively through conservation suppliers.

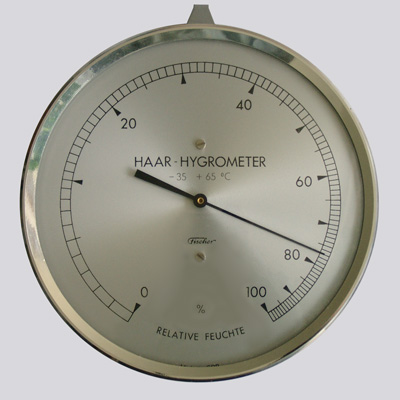
Dial Hygrometer

=== Protection from direct sunlight and UV radiation ===
Radiation from the sun and UV/UVB rays can pose a threat to the integrity of works on paper. Where possible, framed iconographic documents can be hung on walls against windows or stored in dedicated magazines instead of hung on walls across from windows in order to minimize exposure to direct sunlight. Additionally, more important collection items may warrant consideration of an investment in a UV glass frame when on display, which filters out many of the more harmful forms of radiation which can cause fading and chemical damages to the work.

=== Care and handling ===
Physical manipulation of works of documentary heritage with the hands can be minimized to reduce the risk of physical damage of torn leaves and worn edges as well as chemical damage from the acidic uric acids of the skin coming into contact with and burning or foxing the media. Frequent hand washing reduces the risk of chemical damage as many of the uric acids of the skin are found in sweat which can be washed away. With a few exceptions, such as handling photographic negatives, the risk of physical damage outweighs the risk of chemical damage to documentary heritage materials, and the benefits of wearing gloves as a barrier to the acids of the skin being transferred onto the media are generally outweighed by the risks of physical damage to the leaves caused by reduced sensation and dexterity incidental to the wearing of the gloves.

Bound volumes shouldn't be opened to an angle greater than 100 degrees due to the risk of damage to the joints where the spine is attached to the boards. This can eventually cause the boards to come detached from the text block. This risk can be mitigated through the use of digital copies instead of frequent physical consultations, and, in the case the physical document must be accessed, through the use of book supports. While conservation and communication have often been historically viewed as antithetical and competing interests within heritage collections, digitization can help further both goals simultaneously by facilitating access to materials to a broader audience than would be able to physically access them within a consultation or reading room, while at the same time reducing the risk of damage to the integrity of the works due to reduced consultation and physical manipulation.

=== Book supports ===
Book supports consist of a group of wedge-shaped polyurethane foam, or similar medium, designed to reduce the angle by which a book is opened during consultation. This helps ensure the integrity of the spines and joints of bound volumes. This cradle is augmented with snakes, which reduce the need for physical hand contact between the researcher and the document by holding down pages during consultation at the desired angle. Acid-free bookmarks are used to skim lines on pages as opposed to physical hand contact with the page.

=== Protective enclosures ===
Protective enclosures, such as four-flap folders and phase boxes, can assist with the conservation of documentary heritage by reducing exposure between documents and their surrounding environments, such as risks of worn edges, mold, red rot, and rapid changes in relative humidity.

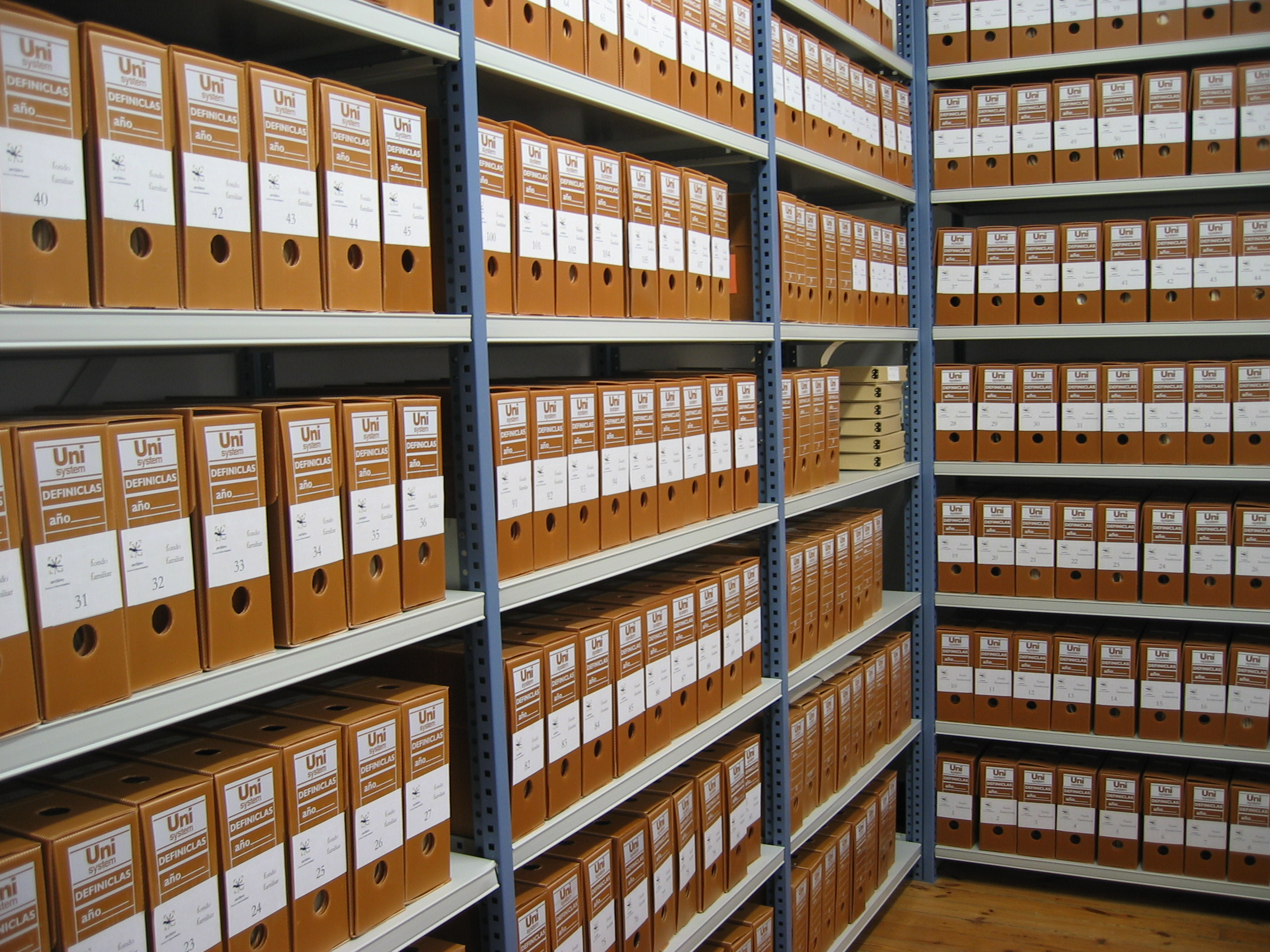
Phase boxes

=== Framing and mounting ===
Framing of iconographic and cartographic documents on display, or in storage in a magazine, can help serve as a protective enclosure between the documents and their environments, such as when the frame is water resistant or contains UV glass to reduce the risk of radiation damage and fading. Documents can be secured to the backboards of the frames using wet hinges, which can be removed from the document without damaging the media. Dry mounting, or the practice of permanently gluing a work to the backboard of a frame, can often be irreversible through conservation treatments, especially if the document was printed on wove paper. Documentary heritage on laid paper which has been dry mounted to the back of a frame can sometimes be conserved by immersing the work in a mild solution in order to dissolve the affixing glue without excessive warping or dissolution of the media.

== Interventionist conservation methods ==
Heritage conservators use the field of interventionist conservation to restore damaged documentary heritage to a stable state of conservation, while preventative conservation focuses on preventing damage to documents through environmental controls, maintenance, and careful handling. Library, archive, and museum professionals recommend consulting a conservator before undertaking any significant restoration projects on documentary heritage materials in order to avoid any excessive risks to the integrity of the works.

== Protection of cultural heritage from human and natural threats ==
=== Blue Shield International ===
The Blue Shield is an international organization which helps protect cultural property from threats such as armed conflicts and natural disasters in accordance with the 1954 Hague Convention for the Protection of Cultural Property in Armed Conflict. The Blue Shield emblem designates cultural property which international law indicates should be protected.

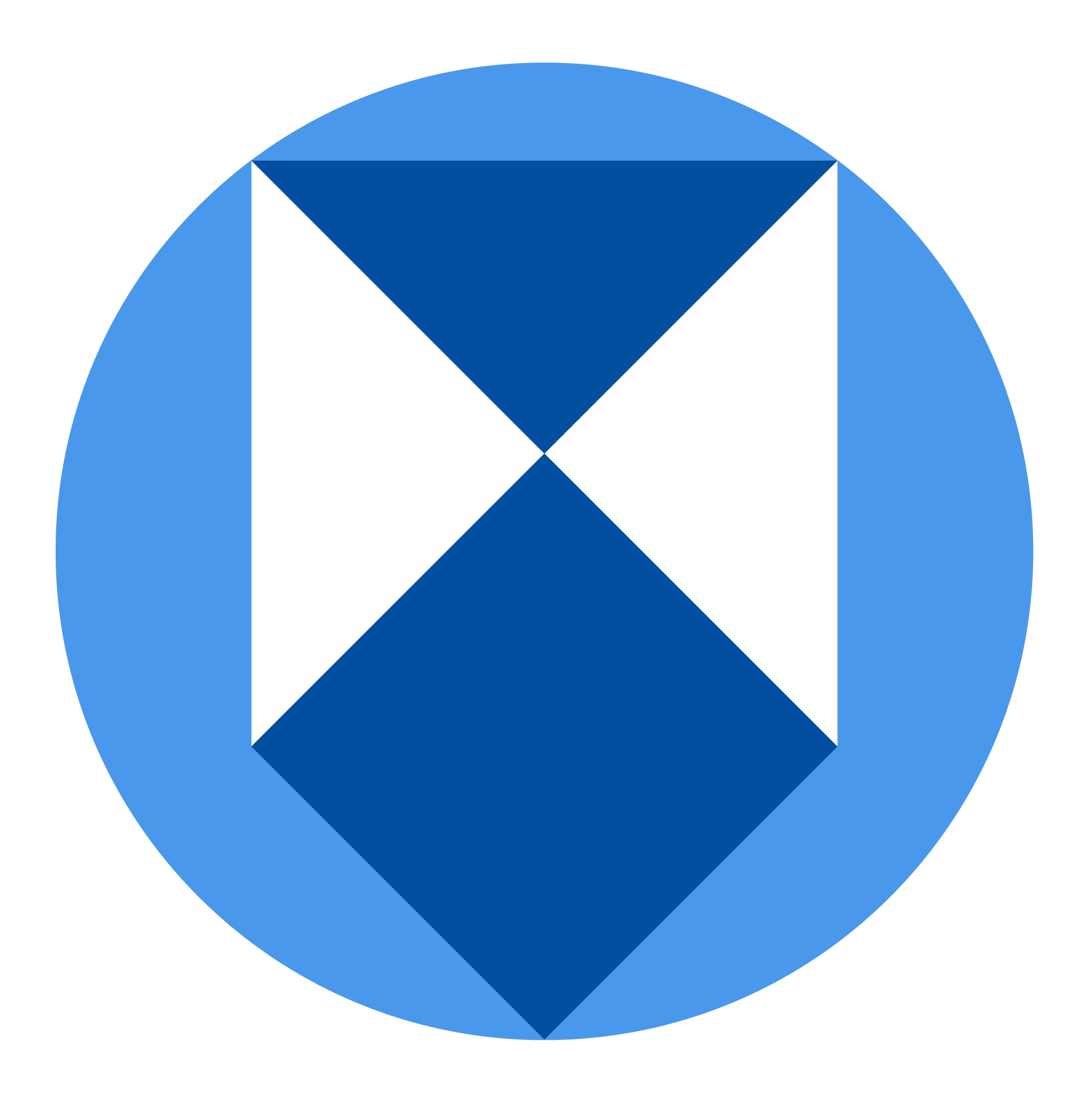
Blue Shield for the Protection of Cultural and Natural Heritage, Tangible and Intangible, in the Event of Armed Conflict, Natural, or Human Made Disaster

=== UNESCO Memory of the World Register ===
The Memory of the World Register is a collection of documentary heritage which the United Nations Educational, Scientific, and Cultural Organization designates as having outstanding universal value to the collective memory of the world's cultural heritage. Inscription of documents on the register helps conservators raise resources for conservation and communication.

UNESCO Memory of the World Program Logo

=== National cultural property protection regulations and export controls ===
Many nations, such as France and Italy, regulate the movement of documentary heritage between ports of entry and impose export controls and restrictions on the movement of cultural property in an attempt to preserve the documentary character and importance that these works can have for the collective memory of regions, nations, and subjects of universal value. Often, works of art and other forms of tangible and moveable cultural property that exceed a threshold over a certain monetary value require an export certificate from a ministry of culture or similar governmental organization before the cultural property can leave the country of origin for purposes such as sale at auction or loan for exhibition at a museum or other foreign cultural institution. The despoilation and repatriation of cultural property looted during times of armed conflict has formed the basis for reconstituting many dispersed collections of heritage interest. Many nations offer tax incentives for the repatriation or donation of cultural property to public institutions such as archives, libraries, and museums.
