= Florence Ljunggren =

American librarian

- Born: Florence Rigmor Ziegler; August 16, 1906; Nebraska, U.S.
- Died: March 1988 (age 81)
- Education: Columbia University
- Occupations: Librarian, bibliographer, clubwoman
- Spouse: Swedish-born Thor Hagbert Ljunggren (div. 1955)
- Children: 1

Florence Rigmor Ziegler Ljunggren (August 16, 1906 – March 1988) was an American librarian, bibliographer, and clubwoman, based at the American University in Cairo from 1956 to 1966.

== Early life and education ==
Florence Ziegler was born in Florence, Nebraska, the daughter of M. Christian Ziegler and Kristiane (Christina) Offersen Ziegler. Both of her parents were born in Denmark. When she was a small child, her father died when the family's home burned down. She was a stenographer in Chicago as a young woman, and participated in archaeological excavations in the American Southwest. She earned a master's degree in library science at Columbia University.

== Career ==
Ljunggren was active in the Altrurian Club of Springfield, Vermont. She taught art, and lectured on various topics, including Native American weaving, Danish girls' lives, and German culture. She organized the club's exhibit, "Vermont at Work", in 1946. The exhibit won national honors, and became part of the permanent display in the state capital. Also in 1946, she was a finalist in a national essay contest sponsored by the General Federation of Women's Clubs and Atlantic Monthly. She was elected secretary of Vermont's chapter of the United World Federalists in 1949.

Ljunggren worked at the New York Public Library and at the Enoch Pratt Free Library in Baltimore. In 1956, she became a librarian on the staff of the American University in Cairo. From 1962 to 1966, Ljunggren was director of the school's library. She published several reference guides to resources on the Middle East and North Africa.

== Publications ==
- An international directory of institutes and societies interested in the Middle East (1962, with Charles L. Geddes)
- Annotated guide to journals dealing with the Middle East and North Africa (1964, with Mohammed Hamdi)
- The Arab World index: An international guide to periodical literature in the social sciences and humanities in the contemporary Arab World, 1960-1964 (1967)

== Personal life ==
Ziegler married Swedish-born Thor Hagbert Ljunggren. They had a son, Bengt (1932–1984), born in Sweden. The Ljunggrens divorced in 1955. She died in 1988, at the age of 81.
