= Memory of the World Register in Latin America and the Caribbean =

UNESCO's Memory of the World International Register lists documentary heritage – texts, audio-visual materials, library and archive holdings – that have been judged to be of global importance. The register brings that heritage to the attention of experts and the wider public, promoting the preservation, digitization, and dissemination of those materials. The first inscriptions were added to the register in 1997. As of 2025, 570 pieces of documentary heritage had been included in the register. Of these, 83 were nominated or co-nominated by countries from the region of Latin America and the Caribbean. These include recordings of folk music, ancient languages and phonetics, aged remnants of religious and secular manuscripts, collective lifetime works of renowned giants of literature, science and music, copies of landmark motion pictures and short films, and accounts documenting changes in the world's political, economic and social stage.

Letter by Bertha Lutz, University of Campinas Memory Center, Brazil

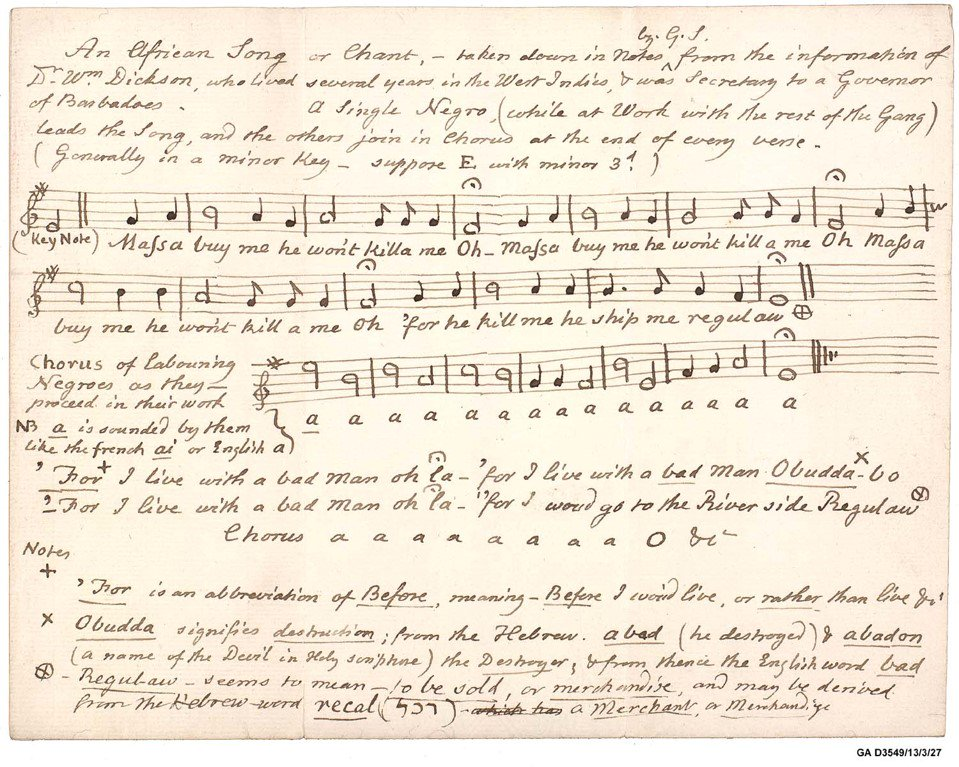
An African Song or Chant from Barbados

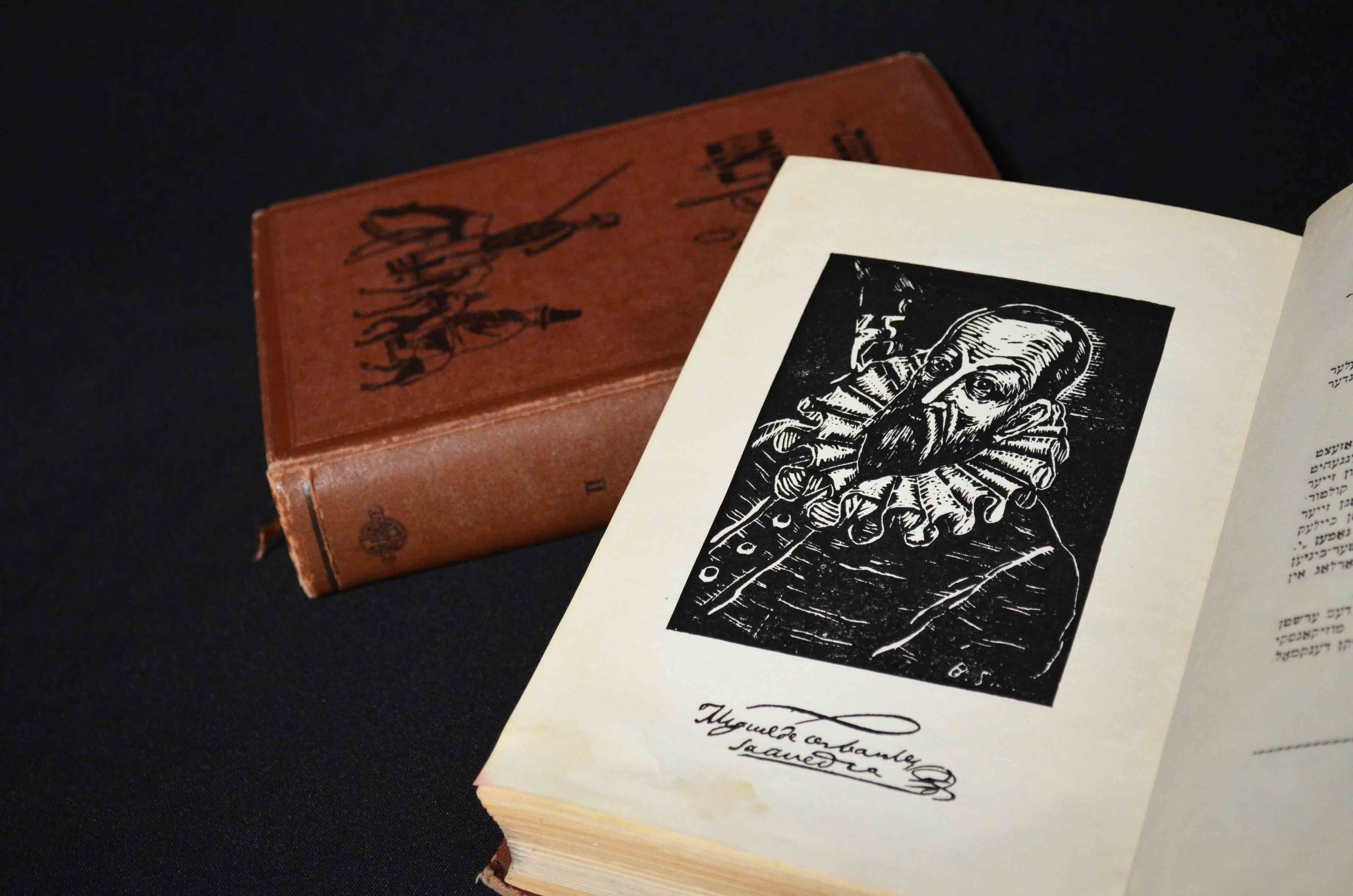
Don Quixote in Yiddish, from the Collection of the Center of Documentation and Investigation of the Ashkenazi Community in Mexico

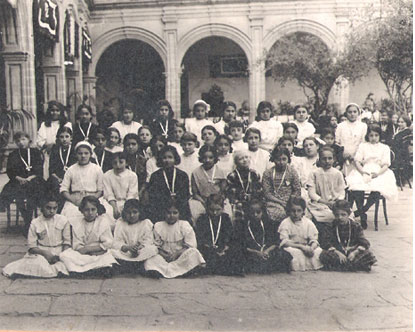
Photograph from the Historical Archive, Colegio de San Ignacio de Loyola Vizcaínas, Mexico City

== List by country/territory ==
Documentary heritage^{[A]}	Country/Territory	Custodian(s), Location(s)	Year inscribed	Reference
The West India Committee collection	Anguilla, Antigua and Barbuda, Jamaica, United Kingdom, Montserrat	Sidney Martin Library, University of the West Indies at Cave Hill 13°08′00″N 59°37′47″W	2015	
Documentary heritage of the Viceroyalty of the Río de la Plata	Argentina	National Archives, Buenos Aires 34°36′18″S 58°22′15″W	1997	
Human Rights Documentary Heritage 1976–1983 - Archives for Truth, Justice and Memory in the struggle against State Terrorism	Argentina	CONADEP Documentary Fonds 34°36′06″S 58°22′17″W; Secretaría de Derechos Humanos de la Provincia de Buenos Aires 34°55′02″S 57°56′57″W; Honorable Legislatura de la Provincia de Tucumán 26°49′03″S 65°12′11″W; Subsecretaría de Derechos Humanos de la Provincia de Tucumán 26°50′29″S 65°11′49″W; Archivo General de la Provincia de Santa Fe 31°38′48″S 60°42′54″W; Sub- Secretary for Public Security of the Ministry of Government, Justice and Religious Affairs 31°38′50″S 60°42′35″W; Penitentiary Service of Santa Fe Province 31°39′41″S 60°42′44″W; Comisión Provincial por la Memoria 34°54′52″S 57°56′42″W; Government of Mendoza Province., Sub-Secretary for Community Relations, Ministry of Justice and Security 32°55′35″S 68°51′12″W; Museo de la Memoria de Rosario 32°56′39″S 60°39′03″W; Asociación Abuelas de Plaza de Mayo 32°56′44″S 60°37′59″W; Asamblea Permanente por los Derechos Humanos (APDH) 34°36′09″S 58°23′33″W; Centro de Estudios Legales y Sociales 34°36′52″S 58°22′39″W; Asociación Civil Madres de Plaza de Mayo – Línea Fundadora 34°36′36″S 58°22′40″W; Servicio Paz y Justicia /Service for Peace and Justice Foundation (SERPAJ) 34°37′00″S 58°22′38″W; Asociación de Ex Detenidos Desaparecidos 34°37′13″S 58°23′28″W; Asociación Civil Memoria Abierta 34°36′17″S 58°24′11″W; Familiares de Desaparecidos y Detenidos por Razones Políticas 34°36′32″S 58°23′37″W; Institutional Archive of the Civil Association Anahí 34°55′22″S 57°57′46″W; Fondo Adelina Dematti de Alaye 34°55′52″S 57°58′26″W	2007	
The Villa Ocampo Documentation Center	Argentina, United States	UNESCO Villa Ocampo 34°27′29″S 58°31′06″W; Harvard College Library, Harvard University 42°22′23″N 71°06′57″W	2017	
Documentary heritage of the enslaved people of the Dutch Caribbean and their descendants (1816-1969) - Aruba	Aruba	National Archives of Aruba, Oranjestad 12°30′26″N 70°00′35″W; National Library of Aruba, Oranjestad 12°30′54″N 70°01′46″W	2025	
Farquharson's Journal	The Bahamas	Bahamas Archives, Nassau 25°04′19″N 77°19′21″W	2009	
Registry of Slaves of the British Caribbean 1817-1834	The Bahamas, Belize, Dominica, Jamaica, Saint Kitts and Nevis, Trinidad and Tobago, United Kingdom	Bahamas Archives, Nassau 25°04′19″N 77°19′21″W; Belize Archives and Records Service 17°15′08″N 88°46′07″W; National Documentation Centre, Roseau 15°18′02″N 61°23′11″W; Jamaica Archives & Records Department 17°59′49″N 76°57′17″W; National Archives, Government Headquarters, Basseterre 17°17′44″N 62°43′30″W; National Archives Trinidad and Tobago 10°39′37″N 61°30′46″W; The National Archives-Kew 51°28′53″N 0°16′48″W	2009	
Documentary Heritage of Enslaved Peoples of the Caribbean	Barbados	Barbados Museum and Historical Society, St. Michael 13°05′00″N 59°36′08″W	2003	
Federal Archives Fonds	Barbados	University of West Indies Cave Hill Campus, Bridgetown 13°08′07″N 59°37′50″W	2009	
The Nita Barrow Collection	Barbados	University of West Indies Cave Hill Campus, Bridgetown 13°08′07″N 59°37′50″W	2009	
Silver Men: West Indian Labourers at the Panama Canal	Barbados, Jamaica, Panama, Saint Lucia, United Kingdom, United States	Barbados Museum and Historical Society, St. Michael 13°05′00″N 59°36′08″W; Bahamas Archives, Nassau 25°04′19″N 77°19′21″W; Jamaican Archives and Records Department, St. Catherine 17°59′49″N 76°57′17″W; National Library of Jamaica 17°58′02″N 76°47′24″W; St. Lucia National Archives, Castries 14°01′10″N 60°59′55″W; Museo del Canal Interoceánico de Panamá, Panama City 8°57′07″N 79°32′05″W; Mrs. Primrose Mallet-Harris, Mallet Court, Taunton 50°59′41″N 2°57′12″W; The National Archives-Kew 51°28′53″N 0°16′48″W; The National Archives and Records Administration 39°00′02″N 76°57′35″W; The George A. Smathers Library, University of Florida 29°39′06″N 82°20′34″W	2011	
The West Indian Commission Papers	Barbados	Sidney Martin Library, University of the West Indies 13°08′00″N 59°37′47″W	2015	
An African Song or Chant from Barbados	Barbados, United Kingdom	Gloucestershire Archives 51°52′07″N 2°14′28″W	2017	
American Colonial Music: a sample of its documentary richness	Bolivia, Colombia, Mexico, Peru	Biblioteca Nacional del Peru 12°05′15″S 77°00′18″W; Archivo Histórico de la Arquidiócesis de Oaxaca 17°03′43″N 96°43′30″W; Archivo Nacional de Bolivia 19°02′56″S 65°15′39″W; Catedral Primada de Colombia - Archivo Musical de la Catedral 4°35′52″N 74°04′31″W	2007	
Documentary Fonds of Royal Audiencia Court of La Plata (RALP)	Bolivia	Archivo Nacional de Bolivia 19°02′56″S 65°15′39″W	2011	
Cathedral of La Plata Church Music Manuscript Collection	Bolivia	Archivo Nacional de Bolivia 19°02′56″S 65°15′39″W	2013	
Life and Works of Ernesto Che Guevara: from the originals manuscripts of its adolescence and youth to the campaign Diary in Bolivia	Bolivia, Cuba	Che Guevara Studies Center, Havana 23°06′49″N 82°24′36″W	2013	
Secular Town Council of Potosí (1585-1817)	Bolivia	National Archive and Library of Bolivia, Sucre 19°02′05″S 65°16′00″W	2025	
The Emperor's collection: foreign and Brazilian photography in the 19th century	Brazil	Fundação Biblioteca Nacional 22°54′35″S 43°10′31″W	2003	
Network of information and counter information on the military regime in Brazil (1964-1985)	Brazil	National Archives of Brazil 22°54′23″S 43°11′26″W	2011	
Dutch West India Company (Westindische Compagnie) archives	Brazil, Ghana, Netherlands, Guyana, Netherlands Antilles, Suriname, United Kingdom, United States	Albany County Hall of Records, Albany, New York 42°39′58″N 73°44′51″W; Archivo Nashonal (National archives of the Netherlands Antilles) 12°06′14″N 68°55′26″W; National Archives of Brazil 22°54′23″S 43°11′26″W; Municipal Archives New York 40°42′49″N 74°00′16″W; Nationaal Archief 52°04′52″N 4°19′35″E; Nationaal Archief Surinamee 5°48′39″N 55°12′42″W; The National Archives-Kew 51°28′53″N 0°16′48″W; New York State Archives 42°38′54″N 73°45′42″W; National Archives of Guyana 6°48′10″N 58°08′26″W	2011	
Architectural Archive of Oscar Niemeyer	Brazil	Fundação Oscar Niemeyer para Fins Culturais, Rio de Janeiro 22°55′01″S 43°10′40″W	2013	
Documents regarding the Emperor D. Pedro II's journeys in Brazil and abroad	Brazil	Museu Imperial 22°30′29″S 43°10′31″W	2013	
Antonio Carlos Gomes: composer of two worlds	Brazil, Italy	Arquivo Nacional (AN) - Ministério da Justiça 22°54′23″S 43°11′27″W; Escola de Música da Universidade Federal do Rio de Janeiro 22°54′49″S 43°10′41″W; Fundação Biblioteca Nacional 22°54′35″S 43°10′31″W; Museu Histórico Nacional 22°54′21″S 43°10′10″W; Museu Imperial 22°30′29″S 43°10′31″W; Museu da Universidade Federal do Pará 1°27′01″S 48°28′59″W	2017	
Fundo Comitê de Defesa dos Direitos Humanos para os Países do Cone Sul (CLAMOR)	Brazil, Uruguay	Centro de Documentação e Informação Científica “Prof. Casemiro dos Reis Filho”, Pontifical Catholic University of São Paulo 23°32′21″S 46°40′18″W	2015	
The War of the Triple Alliance Iconographic and cartographic presentations	Brazil, Uruguay	Biblioteca Nacional de Uruguay 34°54′10″S 56°10′39″W; National History Museum of Uruguay 34°53′40″S 56°10′49″W	2015	
Collection Educator Paulo Freire	Brazil	Instituto Paulo Freire, São Paulo 23°32′25″S 46°42′09″W	2017	
Nise da Silveira Personal Archive	Brazil	Museu de Imagens do Inconsciente 22°54′04″S 43°18′04″W	2017	
Feminism, science and politics - Bertha Lutz’s legacy	Brazil	National Archives of Brazil, Rio de Janeiro; Itamaraty Historical Archive, Rio de Janeiro; University of Campinas Memory Center – CMU/UNICAMP, Campinas; Chamber of Deputies, Brasília	2023	
The Ethno-Historical Map by Curt Nimuendaju: a cartographic encyclopedia at the service of languages, cultures, and memories of indigenous peoples	Brazil	Emilio Goeldi Museum, Belém 48°28′35″S 1°27′09″W	2025	
Carlos Chagas Archive	Brazil	Institution of Carlos Chagas Archive, Rio de Janeiro 22°52′33″S 43°14′35″W	2025	
Human Rights Archive of Chile	Chile	Chilean National Archive, Santiago 33°26′31″S 70°38′43″W	2003	
Jesuits of America	Chile	Chilean National Archive, Santiago 33°26′31″S 70°38′43″W	2003	
Collections of printed Chilean popular poetry: Lira popular	Chile	Biblioteca Nacional de Chile 33°26′31″S 70°38′45″W; Universidad de Chile 33°26′40″S 70°39′04″W	2013	
Negros y Esclavos Archives	Colombia	Archivo General de la Nación de Colombia, Bogotá 4°35′39″N 74°04′36″W	2005	
Abolition of the Army in Costa Rica	Costa Rica	Dirección General del Archivo Nacional, San José 9°55′20″N 84°02′53″W	2017	
Central American Court of Justice	Costa Rica	Dirección General del Archivo Nacional, San José 9°55′20″N 84°02′53″W	2017	
"José Martí Pérez" Fonds	Cuba	Marti Study Centre, Havana 23°08′11″N 82°24′07″W	2005	
Original Negative of the Noticiero ICAIC Lationamericano	Cuba	Instituto Cubano del Arte e Industria Cinematográficos (ICAIC), Havana 23°07′41″N 82°23′54″W	2009	
Acts of the Havana City council (colonial period 1550-1898)	Cuba	Office of the Historian of Havana, City Museum, Old Havana	2023	
Cuban Movie Posters	Cuba	Instituto Cubano del Arte e Industria Cinematográficos (ICAIC), La Habana Province	2023	
Archive Middelburgsche Commercie Compagnie (MCC)	Curaçao, Suriname, Netherlands	Zeeuws Archief 51°30′05″N 3°36′45″E	2011	
Documentary heritage of the enslaved people of the Dutch Caribbean and their descendants (1816-1969) - Curaçao	Curaçao	National archive of Curaçao, Willemstad 12°07′21″N 68°53′11″W	2025	
Book for the Baptism of Slaves (1636–1670)	Dominican Republic	Historical Archives of the Archdiocese of Santo Domingo, Santo Domingo 18°28′17″N 69°52′59″W	2009	
Documentary Heritage on the Resistance and struggle for Human Rights in the Dominican Republic, 1930–1961	Dominican Republic	Archives of the Documentation and Reference Center of the Memorial Museum of the Dominican Resistance 18°28′36″N 69°55′42″W; Documentary Archive of the Attorney General's Office of the Republic 18°26′53″N 69°55′30″W; Archives of Guillermina Miniño Vda. Puigsubirá 18°27′50″N 69°56′06″W; Documentary Archive of the Mirabal Sisters Foundation, Mirabal Sisters House Museum 19°22′14″N 70°22′06″W; Documentary Archives of the Heroes del 30 de Mayo Foundation 18°28′10″N 69°55′14″W; Documentary Archives of the Manolo Tavárez Foundation 18°27′24″N 69°54′58″W; Documentary Archives of the Association of Relatives of the Heroes of Cayo Confite and Luperon 18°28′44″N 69°55′38″W	2009	
The Gaze of the Other: Documentary heritage of the Salesian apostolic vicariate in the Ecuadorian Amazon 1890-1930	Ecuador	Comunidad salesiana, Quito 0°12′27″S 78°29′21″W	2015	
Ignacio Ellacuría’s Documentary Fond: Historical Reality and Liberation	El Salvador	Curia provincial Jesuitas, Cuscatlán Department 13°40′37″N 89°14′10″W	2017	
The Florid Recollection, a historical speech and natural, material, military and political account of the Reyno of Guatemala	Guatemala	General Archive of Central America, Guatemala City 14°39′35″N 90°27′23″W	2017	
Records of the Indian Indentured Labourers	Guyana, Suriname, Trinidad and Tobago, Fiji	The National Archives of Fiji 18°08′34″S 178°25′27″E; The National Archives of Guyana 6°48′10″N 58°08′26″W; National Archives of Suriname 5°48′39″N 55°12′42″W; National Archives of Trinidad and Tobago 10°39′37″N 61°30′46″W	2011	
Odette Mennesson Rigaud holdings	Haiti	Bibliothèque Haïtienne des Pères du Saint-Esprit (BHPSE), Port-au-Prince 18°32′43″N 72°20′11″W	2017	
Registers identifying enslaved persons in the former French colonies (1666-1880)	Haiti, France, Guyana	National Archives of Haiti, Port-au-prince; Archives nationales d'outre-mer, Aix-en-Provence; Archives départementales de la Guadeloupe, Basse-Terre; Archives territoriales de Guyane, Rémire-Montjoly; Archives territoriales de la Martinique, Fort-de-France; Archives départementales de La Réunion, Saint-Denis	2023	
Collection of Mexican Codices	Mexico	National Library of Anthropology and History, Mexico City 19°25′03″N 99°10′25″W	1997	
Codices from the Oaxaca Valley	Mexico	National Archives, Mexico City 19°26′11″N 99°06′48″W	1997	
Codex Techaloyan de Cuajimalpaz	Mexico	National Archives, Mexico City 19°26′11″N 99°06′48″W	1997	
Los olvidados	Mexico	Filmoteca de la UNAM, Mexico 19°19′10″N 99°10′32″W	2003	
Biblioteca Palafoxiana	Mexico	Biblioteca Palafoxiana, Puebla 19°02′32″N 98°11′56″W	2005	
Colección de Lenguas Indígenas	Mexico	University of Guadalajara, Guadalajara 20°40′31″N 103°21′32″W	2007	
Collection of the Center of Documentation and Investigation of the Ashkenazi Community in Mexico (16th to 20th Century)	Mexico	Center of Documentation and Investigation of the Ashkenazi Community of Mexico, Mexico City 19°25′03″N 99°10′25″W	2009	
Sixteenth to eighteenth century pictographs from the "Maps, drawings and illustrations" of the National Archives of Mexico	Mexico	National Archives, Mexico City 19°26′11″N 99°06′48″W	2011	
Old fonds of the historical archive at Colegio de Vizcaínas: women's education and support in the history of the world	Mexico	Historical Archive Colegio de San Ignacio de Loyola Vizcaínas "José María Basagoiti Noriega", Mexico City 19°25′44″N 99°08′26″W	2013	
Judicial files concerning the birth of a right: the effective remedy as a contribution of the Mexican writ of amparo to the Universal Declaration of Human Rights (UDHR) of 1948	Mexico	Suprema Corte de Justicia de la Nación 19°20′55″N 99°12′07″W	2015	
The Archives of negatives, publications and documents of Manuel Álvarez Bravo	Mexico	Archivo Manuel Álvarez Bravo, S.C, Mexico City 19°20′35″N 99°09′52″W	2017	
Aerial Photography from the Ingenieros Civiles Asociados (ICA) Foundation	Mexico	ICA Foundation, Mexico City 19°21′08″N 99°11′30″W	2025	
Documentary heritage of the enslaved people of the Dutch Caribbean and their descendants (1816-1969)	Netherlands, Suriname, Curaçao, Sint Maarten	The National Archive of Curaçao (NAC), Willemstad; The National Archives of the Netherlands (NAN), The Hague; The National Archives of Suriname (NAS), Paramaribo; The National Archeological and Anthropological Memory Management (Curaçao) (NAAM), Willemstad; The Government of St. Maarten (GSM), Philipsburg	2023	
National Literacy Crusade	Nicaragua	Institute of History of Nicaragua and Central America, Managua 12°07′31″N 86°16′16″W	2007	
Archives of Terror	Paraguay	Center of Documentation and Archives for the Defence of Human Rights (CDyA), Asunción 25°17′14″S 57°39′18″W	2009	
Peruvian and South American First Editions (1584-1619)	Peru	Biblioteca Nacional del Perú 12°05′15″S 77°00′18″W	2013	
Travelling Registry of the Conquistadors or “Becerro Book”	Peru	Archivo General de la Nación, Lima 12°02′38″S 77°01′52″W	2013	
30,693 glass plate negatives (1864-1933) from the Courret Collection	Peru	National Library of Peru, Lima 12°03′00″S 77°01′42″W	2023	
Sir William Arthur Lewis Papers	Saint Lucia	Seeley G. Mudd Manuscript Library, Princeton 40°20′59″N 74°39′07″W	2009	
Records of the Indian Indentured Labourers	Saint Vincent and the Grenadines	National Archives and Documentation Centre, Kingstown 13°09′39″N 61°13′46″W	2017	
Route/Root to Freedom: A case study of how enslaved Africans gained their freedom on the dual national island of Sint Maarten/Saint Martin	Sint Maarten	Department of Records and Information Management, Philipsburg 18°01′31″N 63°02′42″W	2017	
The Derek Walcott Collection	Trinidad and Tobago	University of West Indies, St. Augustine 10°38′23″N 61°23′56″W	1997	
Eric Williams Memorial Collection	Trinidad and Tobago	University of West Indies, St. Augustine 10°38′23″N 61°23′56″W	1999	
The C.L.R. James Collection	Trinidad and Tobago	University of West Indies, St. Augustine 10°38′23″N 61°23′56″W	2005	
Constantine Collection	Trinidad and Tobago	National Library and Information System Authority (NALIS), Port of Spain 10°39′07″N 61°30′42″W	2011	
Original records of Carlos Gardel - Horacio Loriente Collection (1913–1935)	Uruguay	Archivo General de la Nación, Montevideo 34°54′14″S 56°11′50″W	2003	
Photographic Archive of the newspaper El popular	Uruguay	Centro de Fotografía de Montevideo (CdF), Montevideo	2023	
General Archive of the Nation - Writings of The Liberator Simón Bolívar	Venezuela	National Archives, Caracas 10°30′47″N 66°54′42″W	1997	
Collection of Latin American photographs of the 19th Century	Venezuela	National Library, Caracas 10°30′42″N 66°54′44″W	1997	
Colombeia: Generalissimo Francisco de Miranda's Archives	Venezuela	Academia Nacional de La Historia, Caracas 10°30′15″N 66°54′57″W	2007	

== Notes ==
Names and spellings provided are based on the official list released by the Memory of the World Programme.
