= Julia Escalante =

Mexican artist (1854–1900)

- Born: 1854; Mexico City
- Died: 1900 (aged 45–46)
- Education: Colegio de San Ignacio de Loyola Vizcaínas, National School of Fine Arts
- Notable work: Lechero; San Francisco; Graziella
- Style: Genre painting
- Movement: Romanticism

Julia Escalante (1854–1900) was a Mexican artist, known for her work in genre painting.

== Early life and education ==
Julia Escalante was born in 1854 in Mexico City. She was the oldest daughter of Joaquín Escalante, a successful lawyer, and Julia Gómez de Zozaya. Her family traced its roots back to Mexico's colonial aristocracy.

Escalante was educated at the Colegio de las Vizcaínas in Mexico City. She received further training in the arts and became a highly skilled painter, likely studying with an artist from the National School of Fine Arts.

== Career ==
Escalante's father died when she was a young woman, and she chose not to marry and instead focus on overseeing the family's holdings, in addition to her art. This administrative role brought her into the public eye.

Her artistic work was marked by romanticism and genre painting, often depicting idealized scenes of everyday figures, religious subjects, still lifes, and landscapes. She worked to developed a personal, feminine style, drawing significant attention from contemporary critics. Notable pieces included San Francisco, Lechero, Graziella, Madre de Dios con los santos Joaquín y Julia, and Establo con borregos.

Her work was shown at several exhibitions of the National School of Fine Arts, but she also pushed norms by exhibiting her pieces in non-academic spaces, such as Mexico City's Hotel del Jardín. Her piece Lechero was shown abroad at the 1893 World's Columbian Exposition in Chicago.

While Escalante achieved some success and recognition, she was limited by her obligations to her family.

Due to a childhood accident, Escalante had to have one of her legs amputated as an adult. She died in 1900, in her mid-40s.
