= Public Library of the State of Jalisco =

Library in Jalisco, Mexico

Juan José Arreola Public Library of the State of Jalisco
- Biblioteca Pública del Estado de Jalisco "Juan José Arreola"
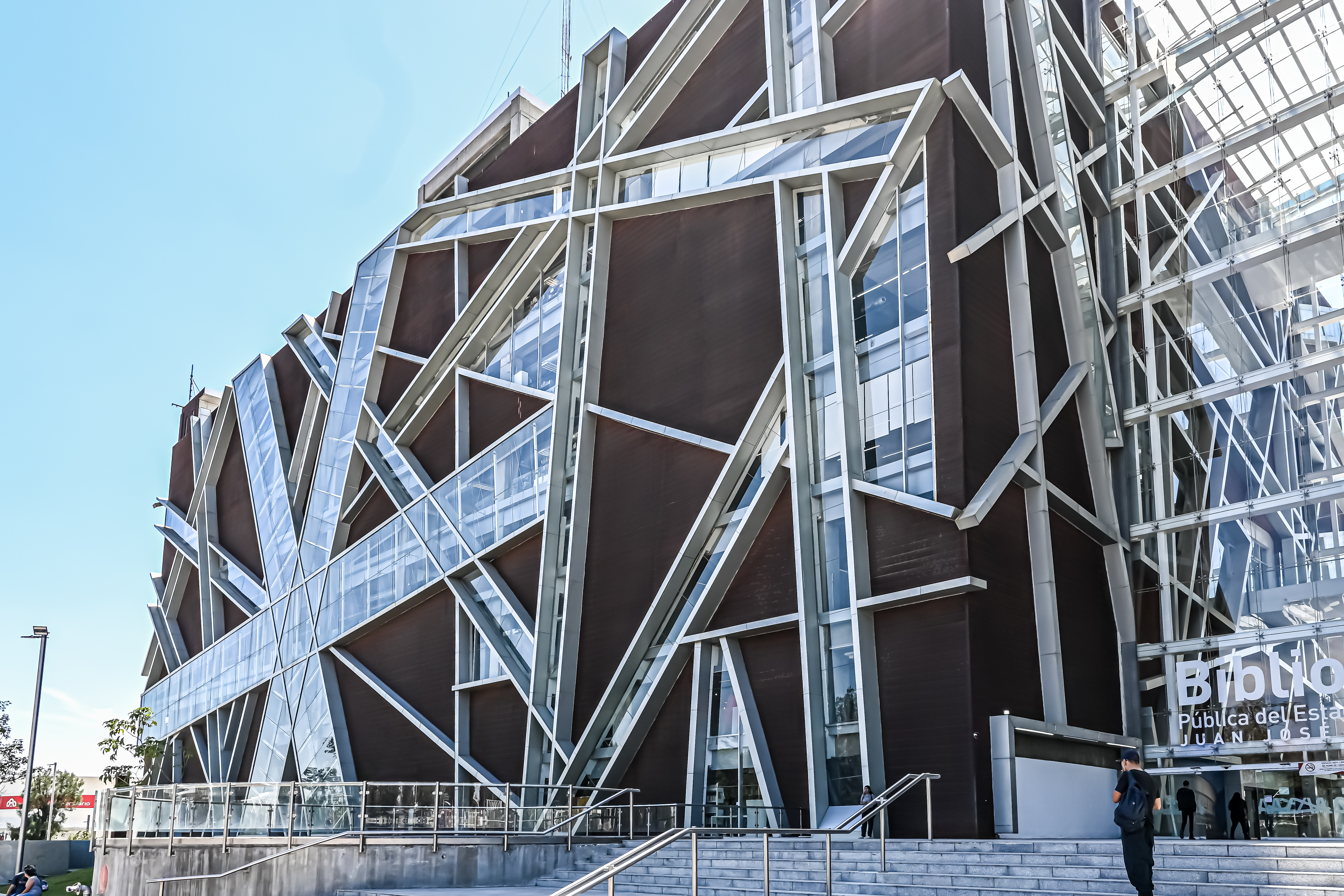
- 20.737931°N 103.381161°W
- Location: Zapopan, Jalisco, Mexico, Mexico
- Type: Public library
- Established: 2012; 14 years ago

Other information
- Affiliation: University of Guadalajara
- Website: bpej.udg.mx

The Juan José Arreola Public Library of the State of Jalisco is an institution dedicated to promoting reading, providing access to information, and disseminating culture in the state of Jalisco, Mexico. It is named in honor of Juan José Arreola, a renowned Mexican writer born in Jalisco. It is run by the University of Guadalajara.

The library has an extensive collection of books, magazines, newspapers, and other printed materials across various formats and genres. Its primary objective is to provide users with a space to connect with culture and knowledge, fostering both reading and research.

In addition to its book collection, the library offers several services, including material loans and on-site consultation, internet access, cultural activities, conferences, workshops, and exhibitions. It is open to the general public and serves as a resource for students, researchers, academics, and anyone interested in reading and culture.

The library hosts the Colección de Lenguas Indígenas ("Collection of Indigenous Languages"), an archival collection of 166 books documenting and analysing indigenous languages in and around Mexico. UNESCO's Memory of the World programme has recognised this heritage as globally important, adding it to the regional register for Latin America and the Caribbean in 2006 and the international register in 2007.
