= An African Song or Chant from Barbados =

Music manuscript with UNESCO Memory of the World status

- Gloucestershire Archives
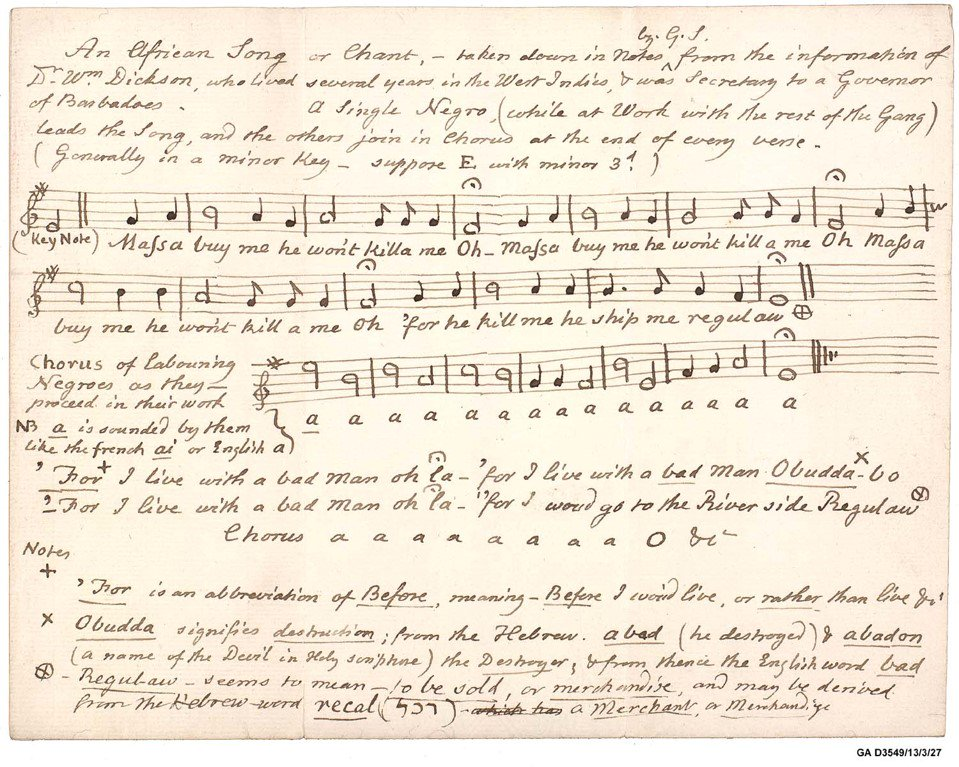
- Type: Music manuscript
- Date: Late 18th century
- Accession: D3549/13/3/27

An African Song or Chant from Barbados is a one-page manuscript of a work song sung by enslaved Africans in the sugar cane fields of the Caribbean. Dating from the late 18th century, it is the earliest known such song. It is also the oldest notation of a piece of music from Barbados. Hans Sloane had already written down three African songs in Jamaica in 1688, but these did not come from the context of forced work and are also incomplete.

There are three versions of the manuscript: two rough drafts and one final copy. These are kept in the Gloucestershire Archives in Gloucester, England with the shelf mark D3549/13/3/27. The manuscripts were added to the UNESCO Memory of the World international register, recognising documentary heritage of global importance, in 2017, nominated jointly by Barbados and the United Kingdom.

== Transcription ==
The lyrics and melody were written down by Granville Sharp (referred to as "G. S." in the manuscript) in Great Britain. Sharp was a prominent slavery abolitionist and also a musician. His source was William Dickson, who lived in Barbados for about 13 years from 1772 and was secretary to the governor there. Dickson was a critic of the slave trade and published two books in 1789 and 1814 describing slave-owning society in the British West Indies. He heard the "African song" in the sugar cane fields of Barbados, at some time from 1772 to 1779. The manuscripts of the song are undated, but must have existed after Dickson's departure from Barbados in 1785 or 1786 and before Sharp's death in 1815.

With Sharp's estate, the song sheet came into the possession of the Lloyd-Baker family, who donated it to the Gloucestershire Archives for safekeeping in 1977.

It is not possible to tell how well the transcription matches how the song was originally performed. It is not known whether Dickson had any musical training, nor how he passed the lyrics and melody on to Sharp. There is a risk of inaccuracy with musical transcriptions that use different sounds from what the transcriber is familiar with. On the other hand, the manuscript shows a great deal of attention to details of pitch and pronunciation, which have been taken to indicate authenticity. The researchers Rickford and Handler judged Dickson to be "a reliable recorder/interpreter of Black speech" based on his other transcriptions of oral texts.

== Melody ==
External videos
- Performance of the song by Roger Gibbs

The melody is written in a minor key ("suppose E with minor 3^{d}") and differs significantly from later examples of music from Barbados, most of which are in major keys.

== Lyrics ==
The language is an early example of the creole of Barbados. In terms of content, the song is a unique source of how the enslaved people perceived their situation. Talking while working was forbidden, but singing was encouraged. The enslaved workers were forbidden on pain of death from learning to write. Hence the text could only be preserved by being written down by Europeans. The opening sentence "Massa buy (Note: Typical of Caribbean Creole is that the unmodified verb stem ("buy") can express the past tense ("bought").(Rickford & Handler 1994, p. 232)) me he won't killa (Note: The enclitic vowel in "killa" (instead of "kill") is typical of early textual examples of Pidgin Creole. (Rickford & Handler 1994, p. 232)) me" makes the reality of enslaved life clear; enslaved people were material assets to the owner ("Massa"), and killing them would be a financial loss rather than a moral problem. The owner's cruelty is also clearly stated ("For (Note: Sharp notes that "for" is an abbreviation for "before". The loss of the unstressed first syllable (apheresis) is characteristic of English-based pidgin and creole languages. (Rickford & Handler 1994, p. 232)) I live with a bad man"). Enslaved people frequently changed owners ("Oh 'for he kill me he ship me regulaw (Note: Sharp noted as a guess that "regulaw" means "to be sold".)). The fact that enslaved people were transported by ship at that time is hinted at several times in the song ("I would go to the riverside regulaw").

== Recognition and legacy ==
The manuscript, along with other material from the Granville Sharp archive, formed part of the 2007 online exhibition Inhuman Traffic, created by the Gloucestershire Archives 200 years after the end of British involvement in the transatlantic slave trade. The Barbadian-born musician and musicologist Roger Gibbs saw an image of the manuscript in the exhibition and prompted its nomination to the UNESCO Memory of the World international register, which lists documentary heritage of global importance. According to the nomination, co-authored by Gibbs, the song "evokes tremendous pathos and suffering at the hands of a brutal colonial system and demonstrates the strength of spirit and resistance against overwhelming odds." It was accepted to the register in 2017.

In late 2024, the song inspired a series of public events in Gloucester examining the legacy of chattel slavery. This included a documentary film, The Slave Song, made by a team who took a copy of the manuscript to Barbados. The manuscript was part of the Hard Graft: Work, Health and Rights exhibition at the Wellcome Collection in London from September 2024 to April 2025.

== See also ==
- Memory of the World Register – Latin America and the Caribbean
