= Colección de Lenguas Indígenas =

Language archive in Jalisco, Mexico

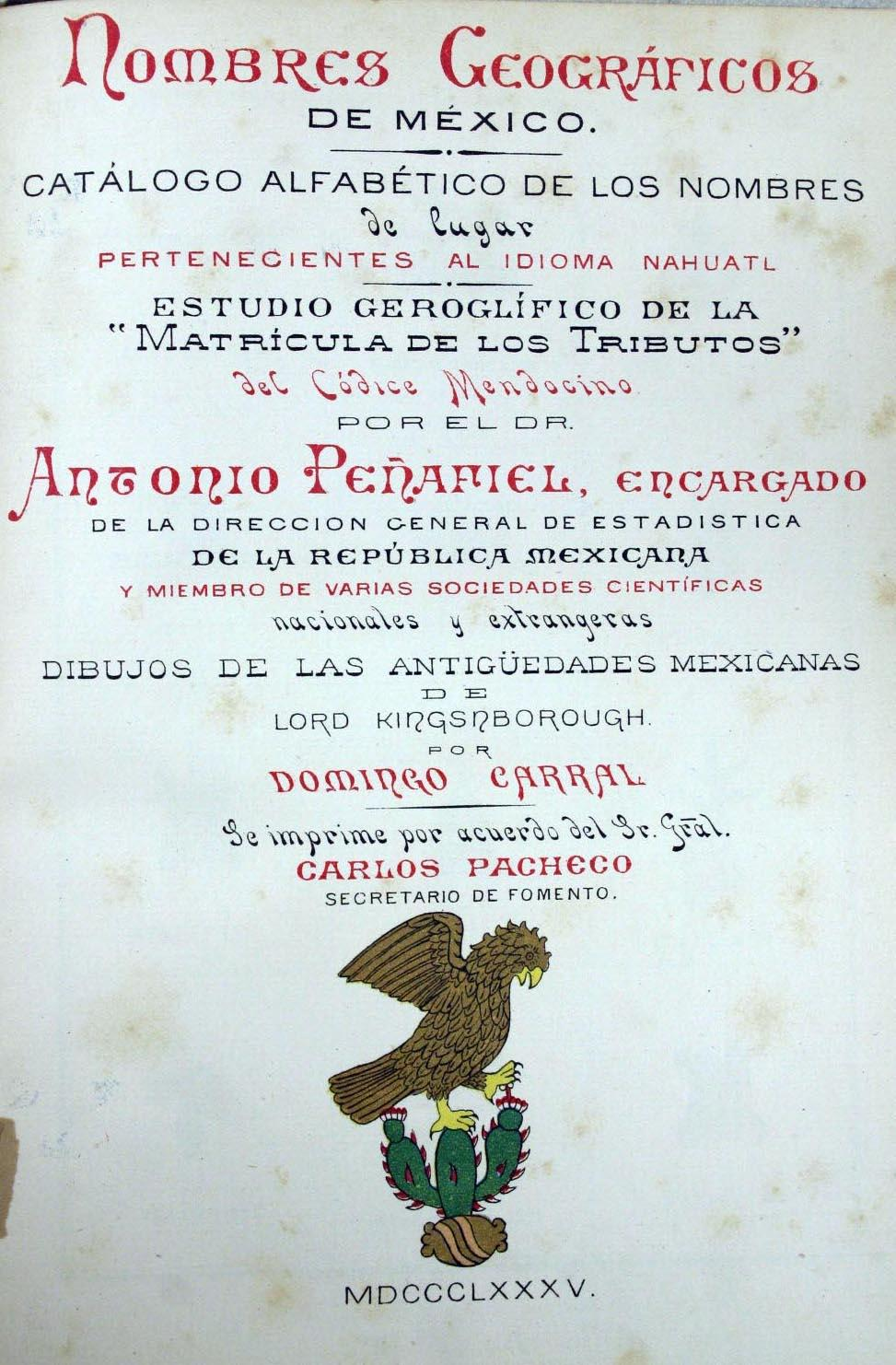
Title page of the 1885 book Nombres geográficos de México : catálogo alfabético de los nombres de lugar pertenecientes al idioma nahuatl ("Geographical names of Mexico: an alphabetical catalog of place names belonging to the Nahuatl language") by Antonio Peñafiel

The Colección de Lenguas Indígenas ("Collection of Indigenous Languages") is an archival collection of 166 books held by the Public Library of the State of Jalisco, part of the University of Guadalajara in Mexico. The books contain examples and studies of the indigenous languages spoken in and around what became modern-day Mexico. Dating from 1547 to 1904, they are sources for scholarship of the indigenous languages of the Americas and of historical linguistics.

Since 2007, the collection has been included in the Memory of the World International Register maintained by UNESCO.

== Background ==
During the Spanish colonisation of what is now Mexico, missionaries from Christian orders – including Franciscans, Dominicans, Augustinians, and Jesuits – attempted to convert the indigenous people. Their evangelism involved translating their message into local languages. They studied and documented these languages, rendering their sounds in the Latin alphabet and describing their grammar. This knowledge was used to translate Christian texts including sermons, catechisms, and confessionals. The printing press arrived in North America in the 16th century and a popular early use was to reproduce books in indigenous languages.

== Content ==
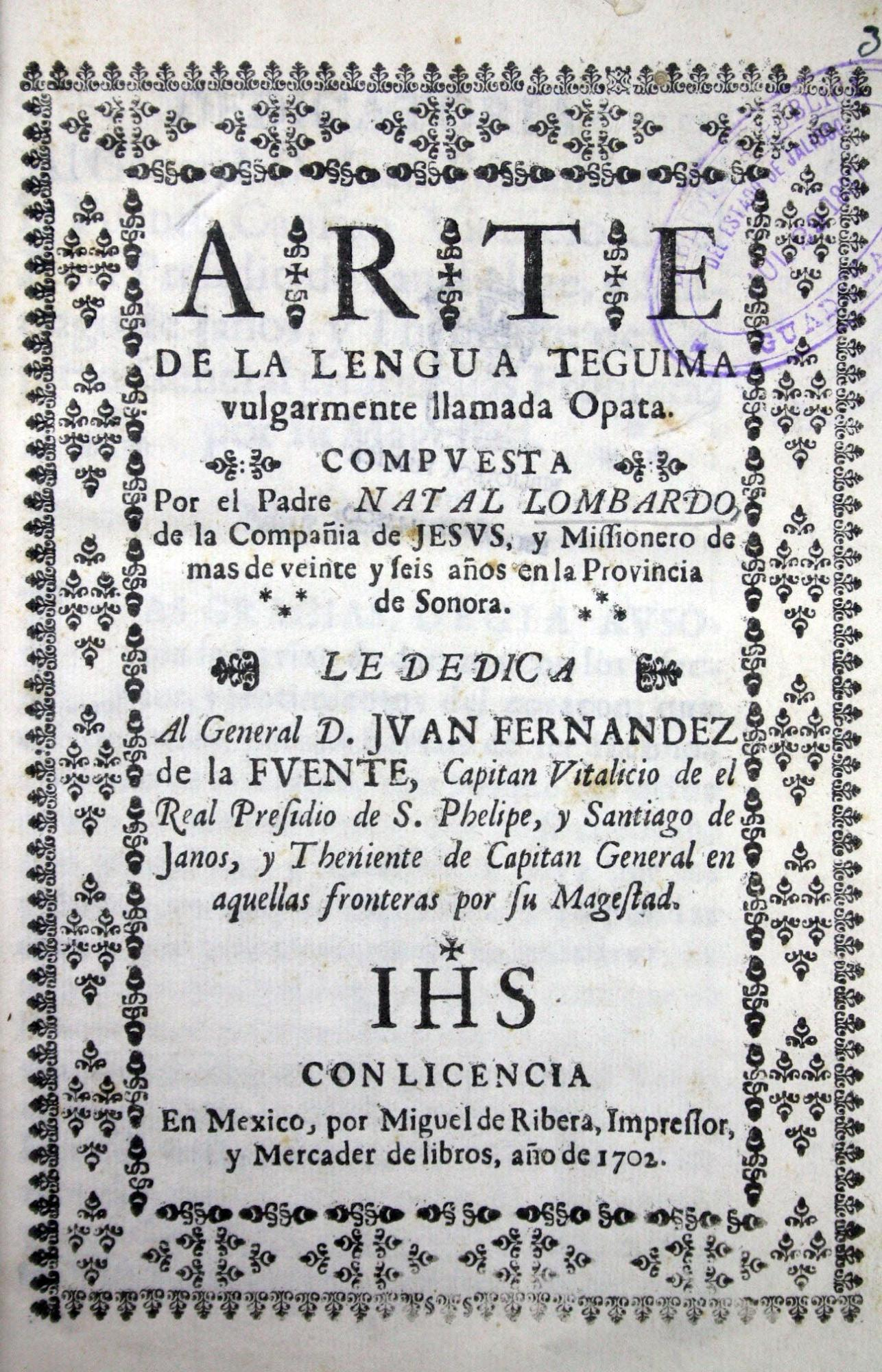
Title page of the 1702 book Arte de la Lengua Teguima Vulgarmente Llamada Opata ("Grammar of the Teguima Language, Commonly Called Opata") by Padre Natal Lombardo

The collection includes 128 titles, some with multiple copies, for a total of 166 books. Its curators divide it into a "core" of texts in indigenous languages (49 original editions and 28 facsimiles) and an additional 51 texts from the 19th and 20th centuries that describe the languages using modern linguistics. The latter include dictionaries and books of grammar, etymology (word origins), and toponymy (place names).

These texts include the only written record of three languages that have become extinct: Coahuilteca, Ópata, and Teguima. A total of seventeen different indigenous languages are documented in the collection.

== Recognition ==
UNESCO's Memory of the World Programme recognises important at-risk documentary heritage. As well as an international register, there are national and regional registers maintained by specialist committees. In 2006, the Colección de Lenguas Indígenas was added to the regional register for Latin America and the Caribbean. The next year, the collection was added to the Memory of the World International Register, recognising it as globally important documentary heritage.

== See also ==
- Memory of the World Register in Latin America and the Caribbean
