= Biblioteca Palafoxiana =

17th-century library in Puebla, Mexico

Coordinates: 19.0425°N 98.1989°W

- Location: Puebla City, Puebla, Mexico, Mexico
- Established: 1646

Collection
- Size: over 45,000 books and manuscripts

Other information
- Website: http://www.palafoxiana.com

The Biblioteca Palafoxiana is a library in Puebla City's historic centre, in the Mexican state of Puebla. Founded in 1646, it is recognized by the UNESCO for being the first and oldest public library in the Americas, It has more than 45,000 books and manuscripts, ranging from the 15th to the 20th century. In 2005, it was listed on UNESCO's Memory of the World Register.

== History ==
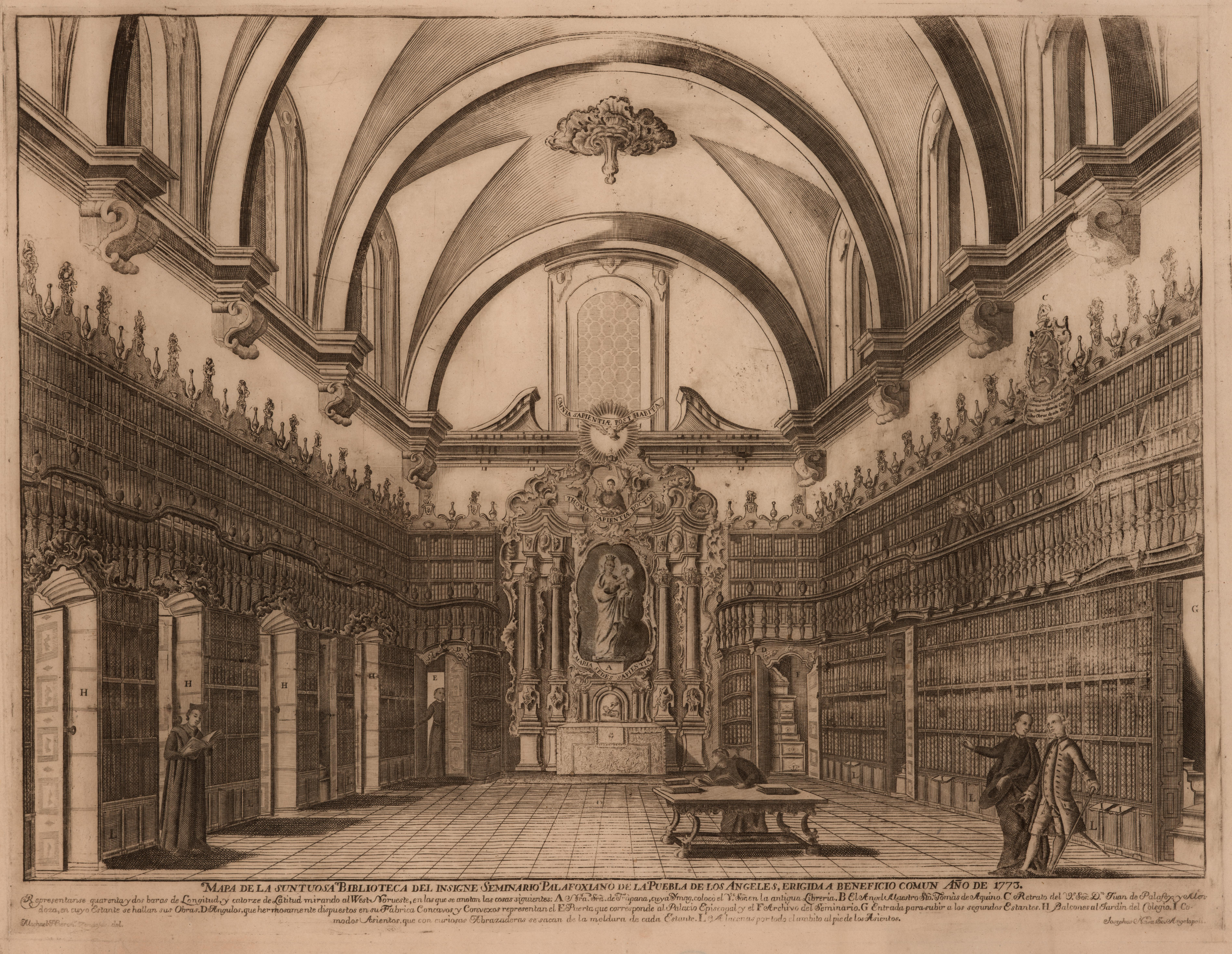
Map of the sumptuous Library of the distinguished Palafoxian Seminary of La Puebla de los Ángeles, erected for common benefit. Illustration of 1773 by Miguel Jerónimo Zendejas. Collection: John Carter Brown Library.

The Biblioteca Palafoxiana owes its name and foundation to Juan de Palafox y Mendoza, bishop of Puebla. He was a lover of books, and is quoted as having said,

He who succeeds without books is in an inconsolable darkness, on a mountain without company, on a path without a crosier, in darkness without a guide.

On 6 September 1646, Palafox y Mendoza donated 5,000 of his own items to the Colegio de San Juan—which was founded by him—on the condition that they be made available to the general public. He wrote that "it is very useful and convenient that there should be in this city and kingdom a public library, where all sorts of people will be able to study as they wish".

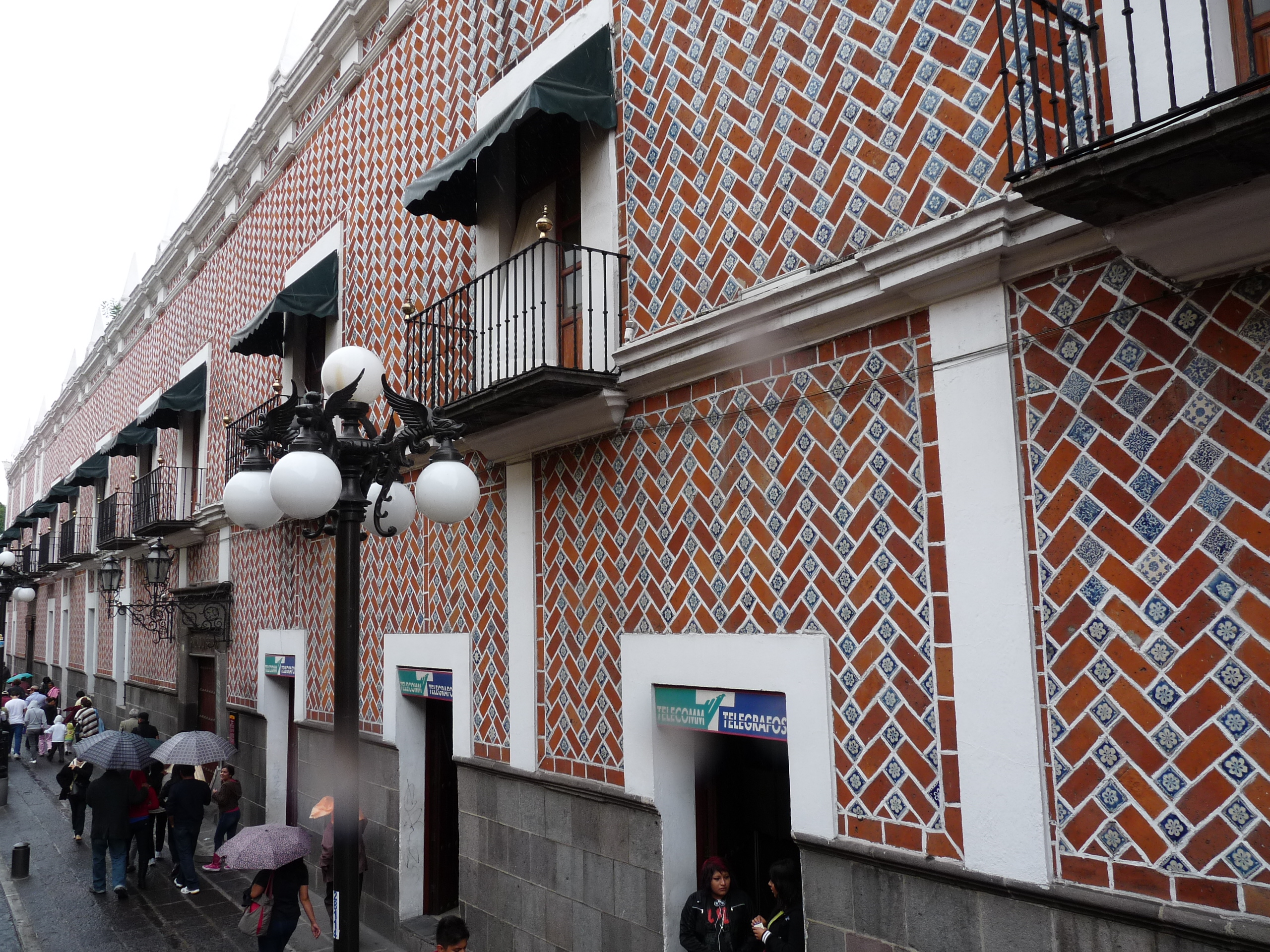
The exterior facade, covered with colonial Talavera pottery

More than a century later, Francisco Fabián y Fuero ordered the construction of the premises which currently house the Biblioteca Palafoxiana. He donated his own collection, and the collections of the bishops Manuel Fernández de Santa Cruz and Francisco Pablo Vázquez and the dean of the Francisco Irigoyen Cathedral were gradually added, as were volumes from Pueblan religious schools and individuals. Books confiscated from Jesuits upon their expulsion in 1767 were also added.

The library was finished in 1773, consisting of a 43-meter-long vaulted hall on the Colegio's second floor. Two levels of bookshelves were built, and a retablo of the Madonna of Trapani by Nino Pisano was acquired. By the mid-19th century, the size of the collection necessitated a third level of bookshelves.

Two earthquakes in 1999 caused damage to the building and shelves, leading to a restoration program in 2001. The library is open Tuesday through Friday 10am-6pm and Saturday and Sunday from 10am to 6pm.

The library has, since its inception, been used by any person who wishes to study.

Today, it houses the Institute for Bibliographical Research which has been in charge of publishing "Los Impresos de la Biblioteca Palafoxiana" promoting the historical value of the collections and its museum.

== Collections ==
The Biblioteca Palafoxiana has more than 41,000 books and manuscripts, ranging from the 15th to the 20th century. It has three major collections: old books, manuscripts, and pamphlets and broadsheets. It also has nine incunabula. The oldest text in the library is the Nuremberg Chronicle dated 1493.

== See also ==
- Casa de la Cultura
- List of libraries in Mexico
- List of oldest buildings in the Americas
