= Casa de la Cultura =

Cultural centre in Puebla, Mexico

Coordinates: 19°2′32.6″N 98°11′55.2″W

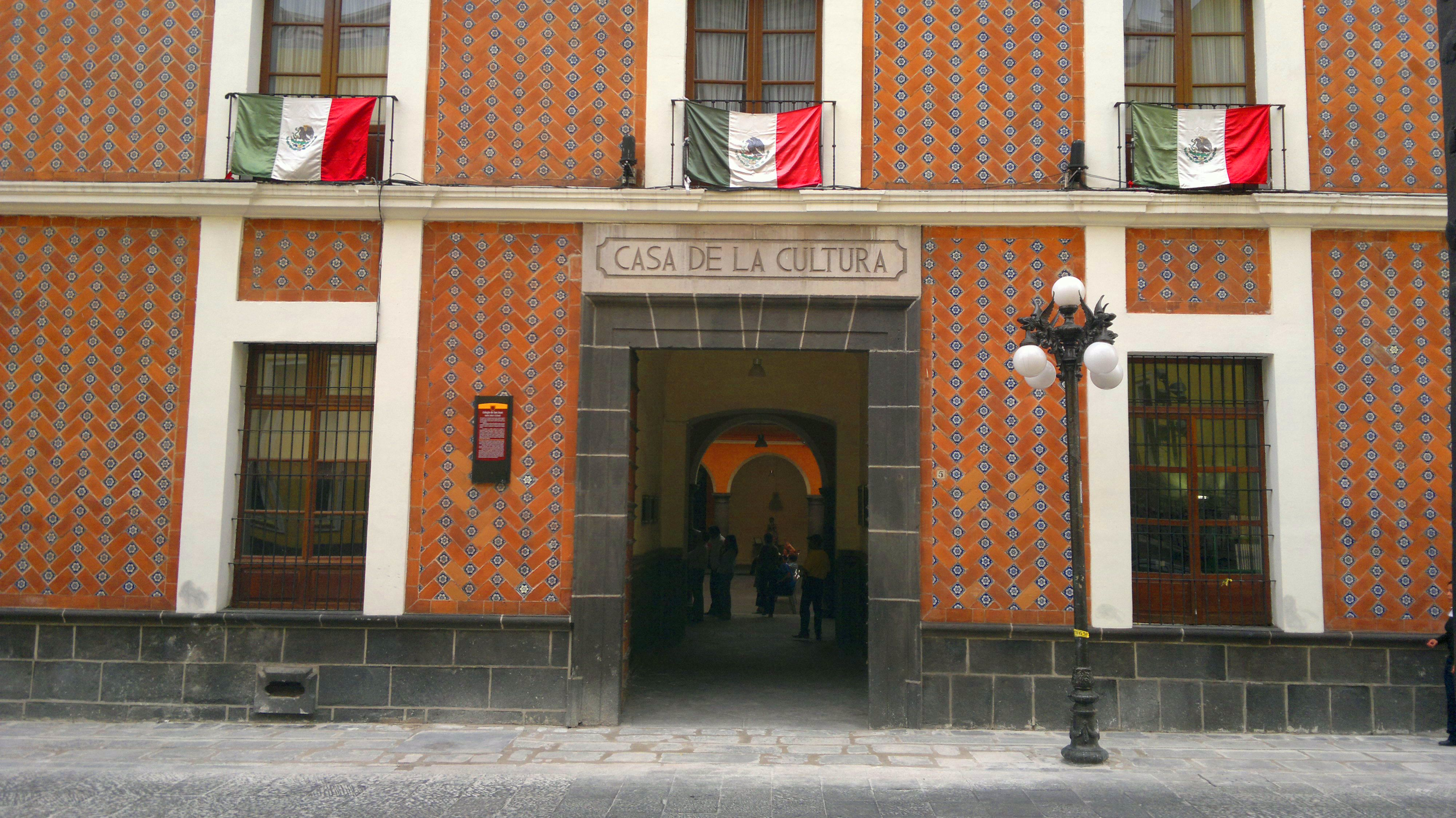
The center's exterior in 2012

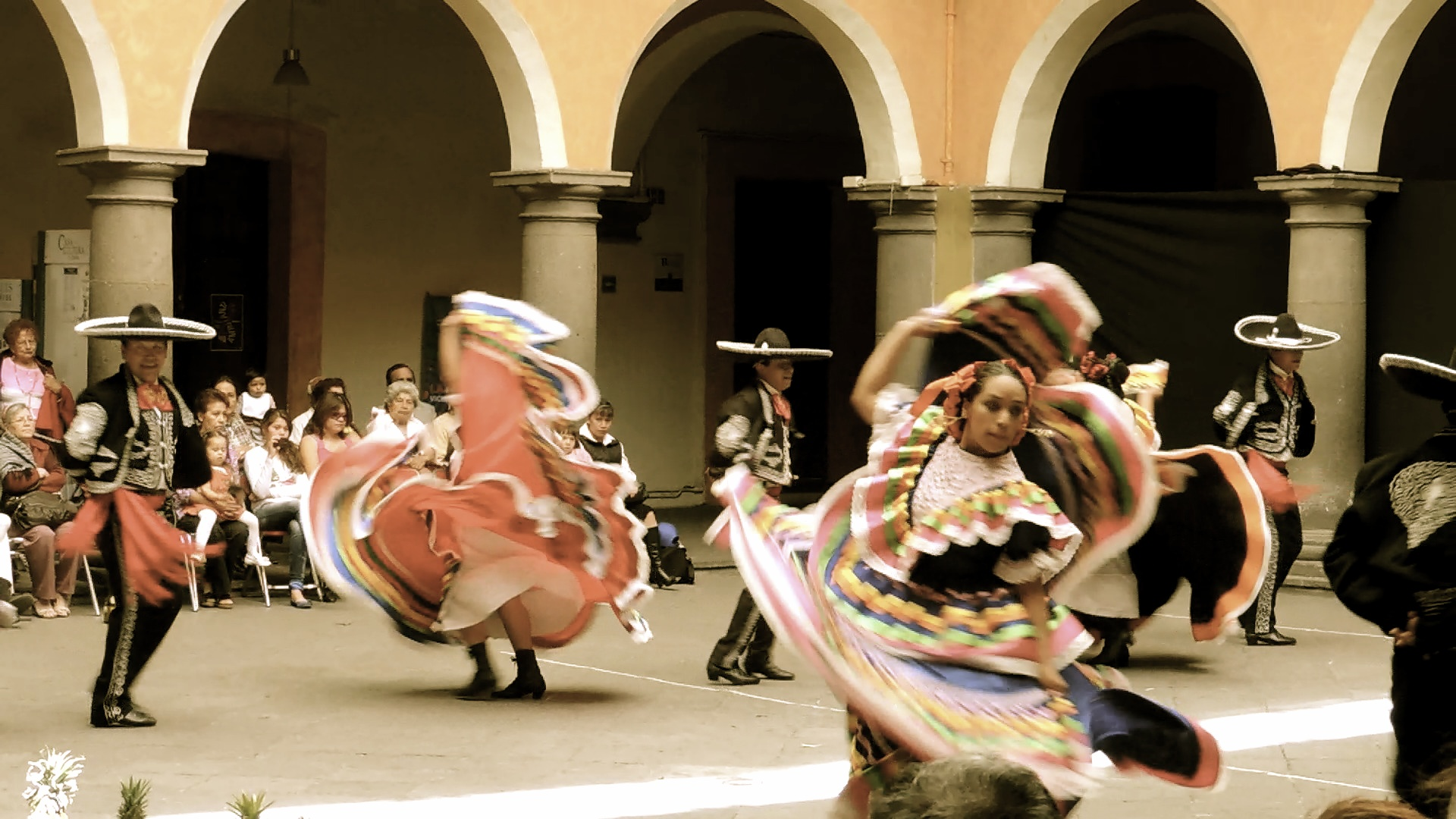
Ballet Folklórico, 2013

Casa de la Cultura (English: "House of Culture"), or Casa de la Cultura en Puebla, is a cultural center in the city of Puebla's historic centre, in the Mexican state of Puebla.

== See also ==
- Biblioteca Palafoxiana
