= National Archive and Library of Bolivia =

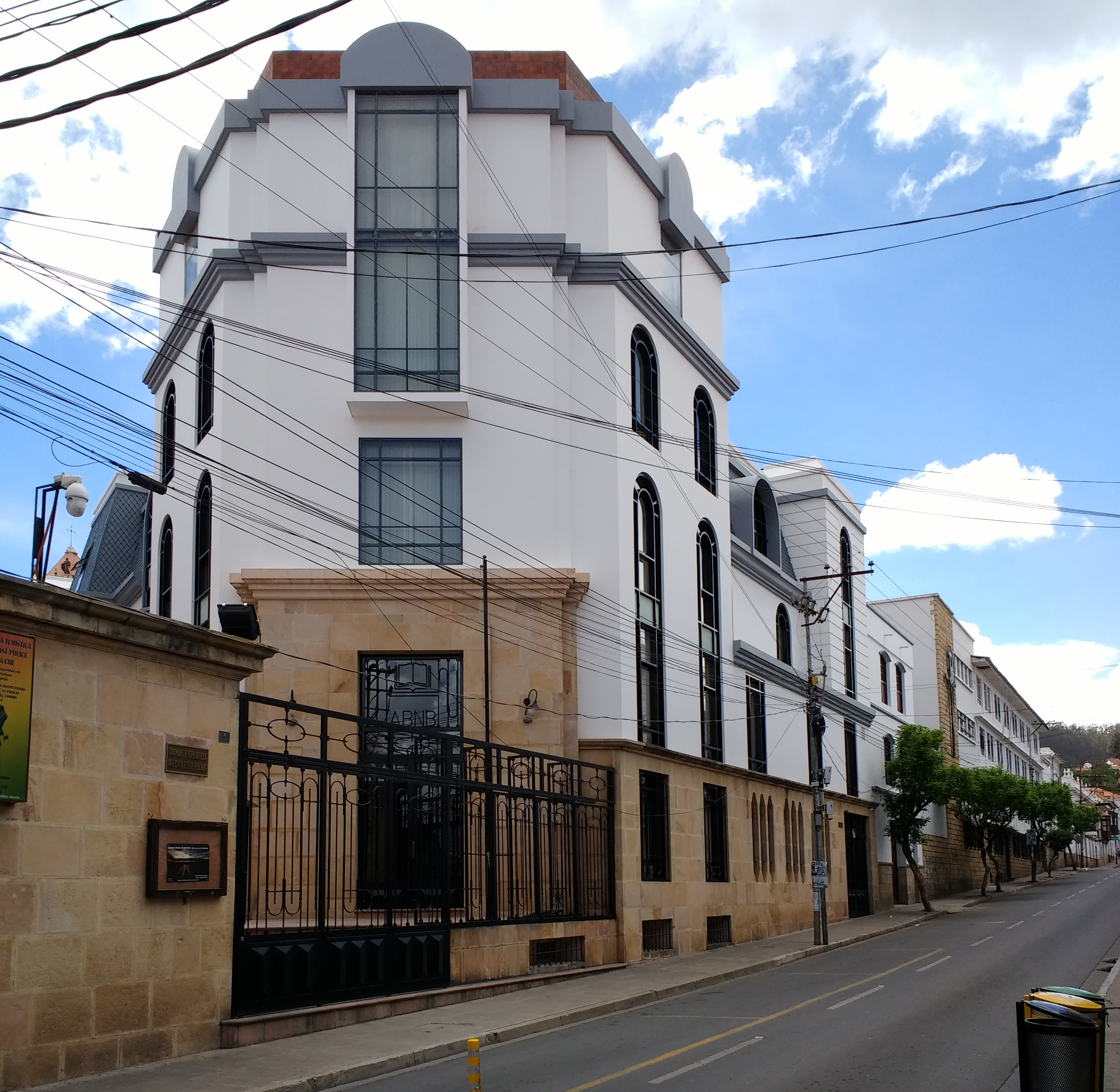
National Archive and Library of Bolivia

The National Archive and Library of Bolivia (Spanish: Archivo y Biblioteca Nacionales de Bolivia) are located in Sucre. The institution was established in 1836. Its collections has 114,000 volumes.

== See also ==
- List of national archives
- List of national libraries
