= Jamaica Archives and Records Department =

National archives of Jamaica

Jamaica Archives and Records Department logo

The Jamaica Archives and Records Department is a department of the Ministry of Education, Skills, Youth and Information in Jamaica. It is responsible for historical archives and government record keeping.

== History ==
In 1955, the Archives Section of the Island Record Office was created under the leadership of Clinton V. Black. In 1982 the Jamaica Archives and Records Department was created by statute law.

== Collections ==
In 2007, the department participated in the Endangered Archives Programme.

== Government Archivists ==
- 1955–1987: Clinton V. Black
- 1987–2002: Elizabeth Williams
- 2002–2008: John Aarons
- 2009–present: Claudette Thomas

== See also ==
- National Library of Jamaica
