= National Archives of the Bahamas =

Coordinates: 25.0718°N 77.3226°W

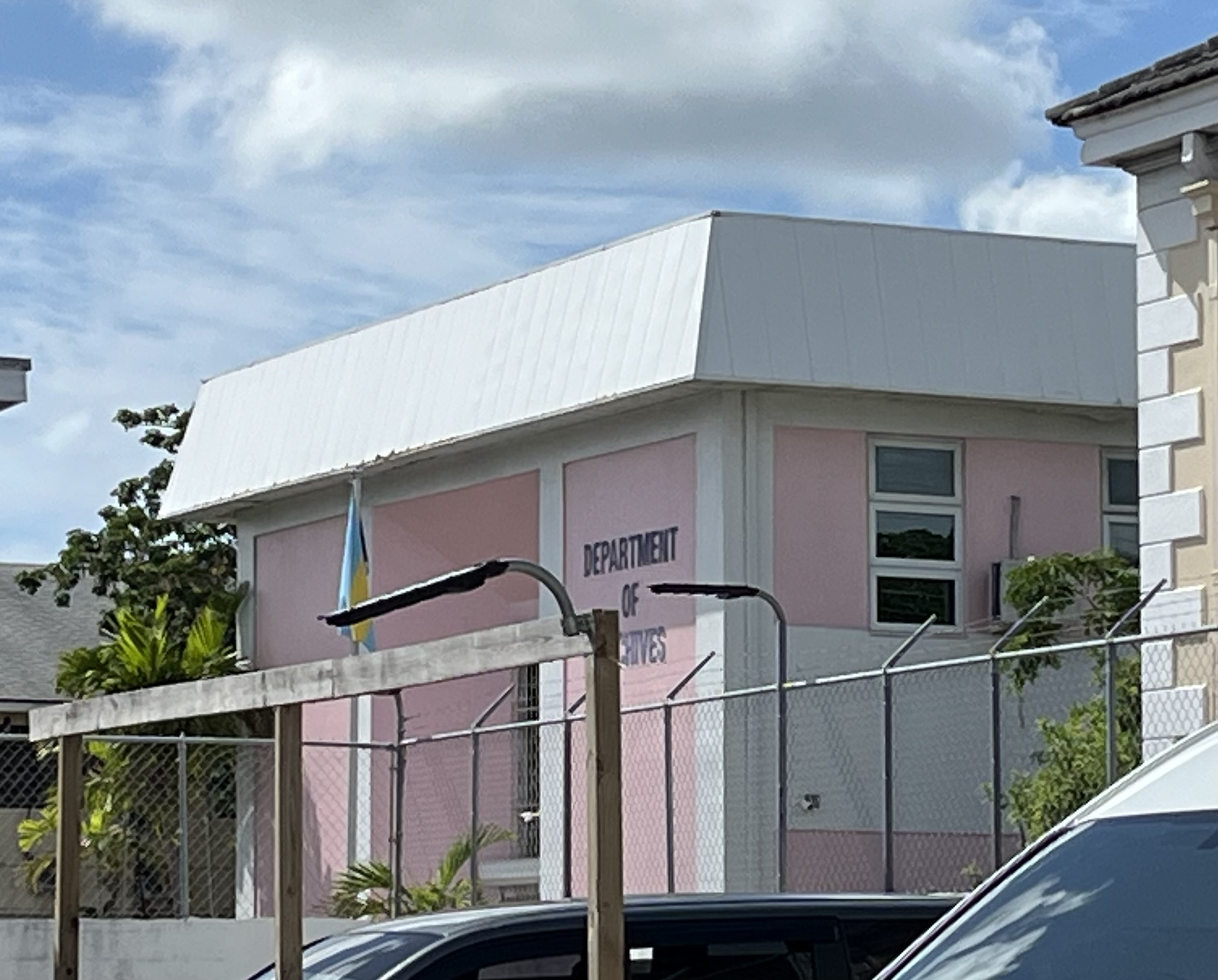
National Archives of the Bahamas

The National Archives of The Bahamas are located in Nassau. The archives (also known as The Department of Archives, Commonwealth of The Bahamas) were established in 1971.

The director is Patrice M. Williams.

== See also ==
- List of national archives
