= National Archives of Guyana =

Stores official records and newspapers in Guyana

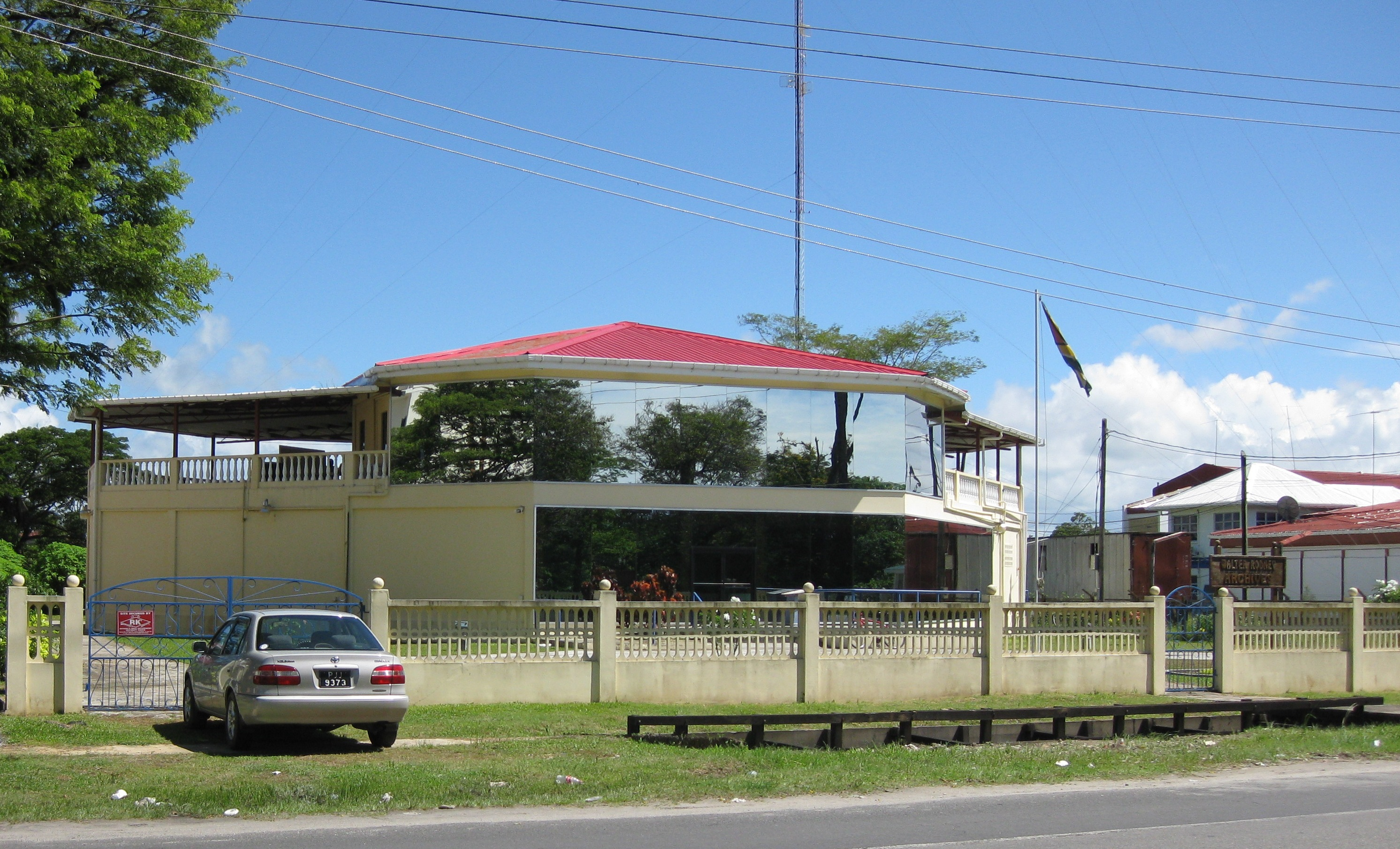

Government Department overview
- Formed: 1958
- Jurisdiction: Guyana
- Headquarters: D'Urban Part, Homestretch Avenue, Georgetown
- Minister responsible: Officer-in-Charge
- Parent department: Ministry of Culture, Youth and Sport

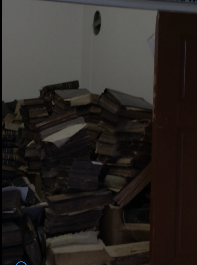
The poor state of document management, December 2015

The National Archives of Guyana (also known as the Walter Rodney Archives) is the legal depository for official records and local newspaper publications in Guyana. Established in 1958, the National Archives are situated in D'Urban Park on Homestretch Avenue in Central Georgetown. In 1972 it was made a department of the Ministry of Culture, Youth and Sport in the Government of Guyana.

== History ==
The National Archives of Guyana were founded in 1958. They were originally located in a building on Main Street.

In 1982, the Government of Guyana passed the National Archives of Guyana Act, which made the National Archives a department of the Ministry of Culture, Youth and Sport, and the archivist an officer-in-charge with duty to report to the ministry.

In the year 2000, the National Archives of Guyana acquired and installed a microfiche unit.

In 2008, the National Archives were relocated to Homestretch Avenue. At this time they were renamed the Walter Rodney Archives in memory of the Guyanese historian and political activist, Dr. Walter Rodney.

== Holdings ==
The National Archives of Guyana is a repository of official state records and local publications, including newspaper publications, from Guyana. In the mid-1980s, the National Archives recorded holdings that measured in at 510,000 linear feet. The holdings date back to the 18th century – the Dutch colonial period in Guyanese history.

== The Guyana Immigration Records Digitization Project ==
In 2013, the National Archives of Guyana launched The Guyana Immigration Records Digitization Project. It is an online search tool for the archives. Phase 1 of the project was to have all the data digitized by the end of 2014. Unfortunately, most data has not been digitized as of 2017 (four years after the launch date). Phase 2 was to have digital images of the records on the search engine, unfortunately, this phase has not begun at all. The public has demanded this online search tool to create since 2002.
