= National Archives of Suriname =

Coordinates: 5°48′40″N 55°12′42″W

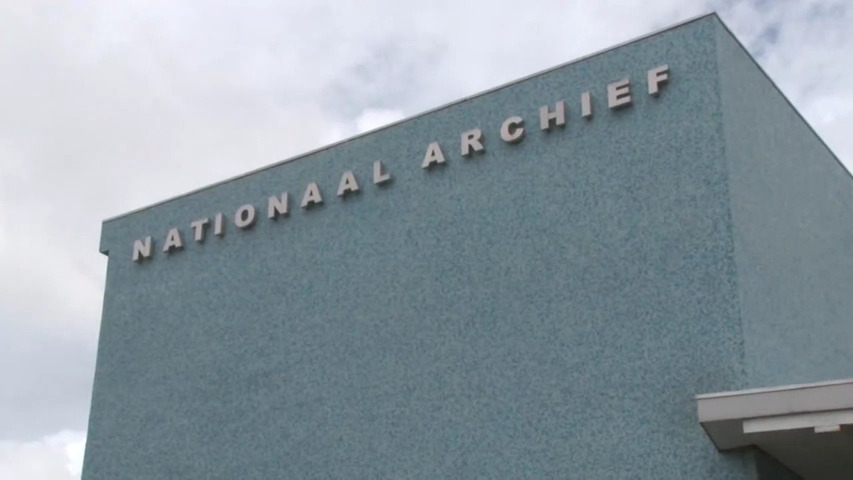
Building of the National Archives of Suriname

The National Archives of Suriname are located in Paramaribo.

The Landsarchiefdienst was founded on 10 November 1956 as a national oversight for the archives of the ministries. In 1982, the Staatsarchief was founded by the Ministry of Education. In 1989, the two archives were merged, and in 2006, the name was changed to National Archives.

In January 2017, the last Surinamese archives from the Dutch colonial period were repatriated from the Netherlands to Suriname, completing a project that started in 2009. Before repatriating the archives, the Dutch Nationaal Archief scanned the whole inventory, making sure the archives remain available to researchers from the rest of the world as well.

Archives from the British colonial period can be found in The National Archives.

== See also ==
- List of national archives
