= National Archives of Trinidad and Tobago =

The National Archives of Trinidad and Tobago
- Interactive map of The National Archives of Trinidad and Tobago
- 10.660383665765677°N 61.511977939620984°W
- Location: 105 St. Vincent Street, Port of Spain, Trinidad and Tobago
- Established: 1903
- Website: www.natt.gov.tt

The National Archives of Trinidad and Tobago is the repository for permanent records and archives of the Government as well as historical records of national significance. The beginnings of the National Archives can be traced back to the aftermath of the disastrous fire of 1903 at the Red House in Port of Spain. This fire destroyed almost all the records in the colony. Subsequently, provision was made in the construction of new government buildings for fireproof strong vaults for the storage of records. Despite the provision of vaults, there was no policy or procedure for the acquisition and preservation of historical records.

== Trinidad Historical Society ==
It was not until June 1936 that the Trinidad Historical and the Colonial Secretary agreed to work together for the permanent preservation of records of historical value. This resulted from a memorandum dated May 26, 1936 to the Colonial Secretary, H. Nankiwell, from the Harbour Master, A. Bertram-Smith. This memorandum drew to his attention the historical value of the records at the Harbour Masters’ Department, their condition and the need for their preservation at a suitable location. The Colonial Secretary solicited the assistance of the Trinidad Historical Society to appraise these records. The Society felt that preservation of official and other archives of the Colony was a national issue. They offered their full co-operation to the Government to collect and preserve ‘records of historical interest’.

These developments led to the creation of a Standing Records Committee in 1937. This Committee's mandate included the appraisal, disposal, accommodation and preservation of records in all Government Departments. It was composed of the Registrar General, the Government Printer and the Director of Surveys, J.W. Maigillviary. The Trinidad Historical Society began to lobby for the development of a Public Records Office and suggested the appointment of a competent Archivist. The Registrar General supported these proposals and submitted a "Report on the proposed establishment of a Public Records office in the Colony" on December 2, 1937. One of the main proposals was the selection of a Colonial Archivist and the acquisition of suitable accommodation, furniture and equipment for housing of the Colony's Archives.

Nothing was achieved until the 1947 Colonial Secretariat questionnaire on the Administration of the Government. Responses revealed that:-

There was no central repository for the Government Archives. Concrete vaults were fireproof but records were plagued by insect infestation.

They also highlighted the huge losses suffered as a result of fires in the Colony. Fires had destroyed valuable and irreplaceable records in:

- 1903 at the Red House
- 1932 at the Treasury and Post Office
- 1946 at Planning and Housing, Harbour Master, Agricultural Society
- 1948 at Port of Spain City Council
- 1949 at the Industrial Advisor's Office and Medical Council Office.

== Role of Eric Williams ==
In response to the Governor's request for advice, in April 1947, the Trinidad Historical Society suggested the formation of a Historical Records Committee. This Committee was to survey the problem and make recommendations related to surveying, classifying, cataloguing and preserving records of historical interest in Trinidad. Little was achieved due to the absence of a Secretary. Work resumed when Eric Williams assumed the post of President of the Trinidad Historical Society in May 1954. He advised the Government to request technical assistance in connection with cataloguing, maintenance and preservation of Archives of the British Caribbean with special reference to Trinidad and Tobago. This request was denied due to financial constraints. Nevertheless, through his many detailed letters, Williams persisted to exert pressure on the Government towards preserving archival records of Trinidad and Tobago.

These efforts resulted in two major thrusts in the 1950s. In June 1954 the Acting Governor Maurice Dorman proposed the establishment of an Archival Office under the supervision of the Central Library with an Advisory Committee consisting of concerned persons. In May 1955 the Executive Council of the Government accepted Dorman's proposals. He was made Chairman of the Committee. Monies were allocated in the 1956 Budget for a new item, ‘Preservation of Archives’. Tobago's Archives were treated separately under District Administration (Tobago).

== Schellenberg Report ==
These developments culminated in the Government contracting the services of T. R. Schellenberg, Assistant Archivist, U.S.A. and Clinton Black, Government Archivist Jamaica in 1958. They were asked to:-

- perform a comprehensive survey to ascertain the extent of archival records in Trinidad and Tobago.
- Give expert guidance on the collection and preservation of valuable records.
- Establish a foundation for an archives, including legislation.
- Educate the general public on the value of the archives

Schellenberg and Black submitted a report by June 1958. This report recommended the following:-

- Creation of an archival institution.
- The appointment of an Archivist
- The appointment of a Government Archives Committee
- The establishment of a Records Committee
- The enactment of legislation to govern and maintain the disposition of Government's records

== First archivist ==
These recommendations were implemented almost immediately with the appointment of Enos Sewlal as Government Archivist in 1960. The Archives came under the Office of the Prime Minister and was located in the basement of the Prime Minister's Office at White Hall. There was an absence of support staff and appropriate accommodation. The Archives was moved from this location to accommodate another Government Department. During the years 1964 to 1970 the Archives changed location several times. In 1970 permission was granted to occupy a building on the present site on a temporary basis. This building was to become the main repository at 105 St. Vincent Street, Port of Spain.

The National Archives also experienced many administrative changes over the years. From its beginnings at the Office of the Prime Minister, the National Archives was placed under the Ministry of Education in 1982. In 1992 the Archives was placed under the Ministry of Community Development, Culture and Gender Affairs. In subsequent years it was placed under the Ministry of Culture and Gender Affairs; Communications and Information Technology; Human Development, Youth and Culture. At present the National Archives is a Division of the Ministry of Public Administration and Information.

The National Archives is managed by a Government Archivist. Over the years this position has been held by the following persons:-

- Enos Sewlal 1960-1979
- Edwina Peters 1985-1999
- Helena Leonce 2000-2007
- Boswell John 2007-2009
- Cheryl Lee Kim 2009-2010
- Avril Belfon 2010–Present

In the early years, 1960–1969, the newly appointed Government Archivist functioned as a one-man unit. In 1970 the staff was increased to twenty (20) persons. This amount remained unchanged until 1985 when the new position of Manager Records Centre was created. At that time, the Repository consisted of a small Search Room with very limited accommodation, a Conservation Laboratory, a Microfilm Unit and a small Administration area.

== Growth of the Division ==
The 1990s brought several changes. Previously the Archives shared the compound with the Sacred Heart Girls’ R.C. School whose building had been destroyed by fire. Their departure in 1990 created much needed additional space. The Search Room could now accommodate over one dozen researchers compared to five (5). The Conservation Laboratory was moved to a larger area. Space was allocated for a computer room, an audio visual room and additional storage areas for materials and supplies.

In 1991 the National Archives acquired a new Record Centre at Chaguaramas for housing the secondary records of various Government Departments. Staff received training under an Archives Development Project in 1992 with UNDP (United Nations Development Programme). This programme included practical training and covered the following areas: - Paper/Document Preservation and Restoration, Microfilming and Audio Visual Archives. During this period the Archives acquired computer equipment for commencing computerization of activities. Audio Visual equipment was also acquired for the establishment of an Audio Visual Unit. In 1993 a project for the acquisition of audio visual material was started in conjunction with the Information Division, Office of the Prime Minister. Towards the end of this period the first phase of a National Archives Refurbishment Project began. This resulted in the construction of a new building housing a Search Room, eight (8) strong rooms, a Database Room, and an Audio Visual Room with listening/viewing facilities.

In 2000 the Conservation Laboratory staff was increased by nine (9) Assistant Conservators on contract. This led to an increase in the number of restored documents and the acquisition of state of the art conservation equipment. Refurbishment and upgrading is also being done in the Microfilm Unit and Search Room. We continue to upgrade staff and equipment in all areas to keep abreast of changing standards and technology for the care and preservation of archival information.

== See also ==
- List of national archives
- West Indies Federal Archives Centre
