= Gloucestershire Archives =

Coordinates: 51.8684°N 2.2410°W

Gloucestershire Archives holds the archives for the county of Gloucestershire and South Gloucestershire. The archives are held at Alvin Street in Gloucester and run by Gloucestershire County Council.

More recently, the Archives at Alvin Street have been rebranded as the Gloucestershire Heritage Hub. The project aims to encourage Gloucestershire residents to investigate their local history; in particular providing an accessible repository of documents for tracking family history. The Hub also provides volunteering opportunities such as the transcribing of historical sources.

In the summer of 2019, the Hub embarked on a construction project to build a new entrance and strongrooms.

== Collections ==
Among the archive's collections are papers of the 18th century anti-slavery campaigner Granville Sharp. These include his transcription of "An African Song or Chant from Barbados", which in 2017 was given UNESCO Memory of the World status, recognising it as of global cultural importance. The Granville Sharp papers were the basis of an online exhibition in 2007, Inhuman traffic, 200 years after the end of British involvement in the transatlantic slave trade.
