= Colegio de San Ignacio de Loyola Vizcaínas =

Educational institution in Mexico City, Mexico

Coordinates: 19°25′42.36″N 99°8′26.56″W

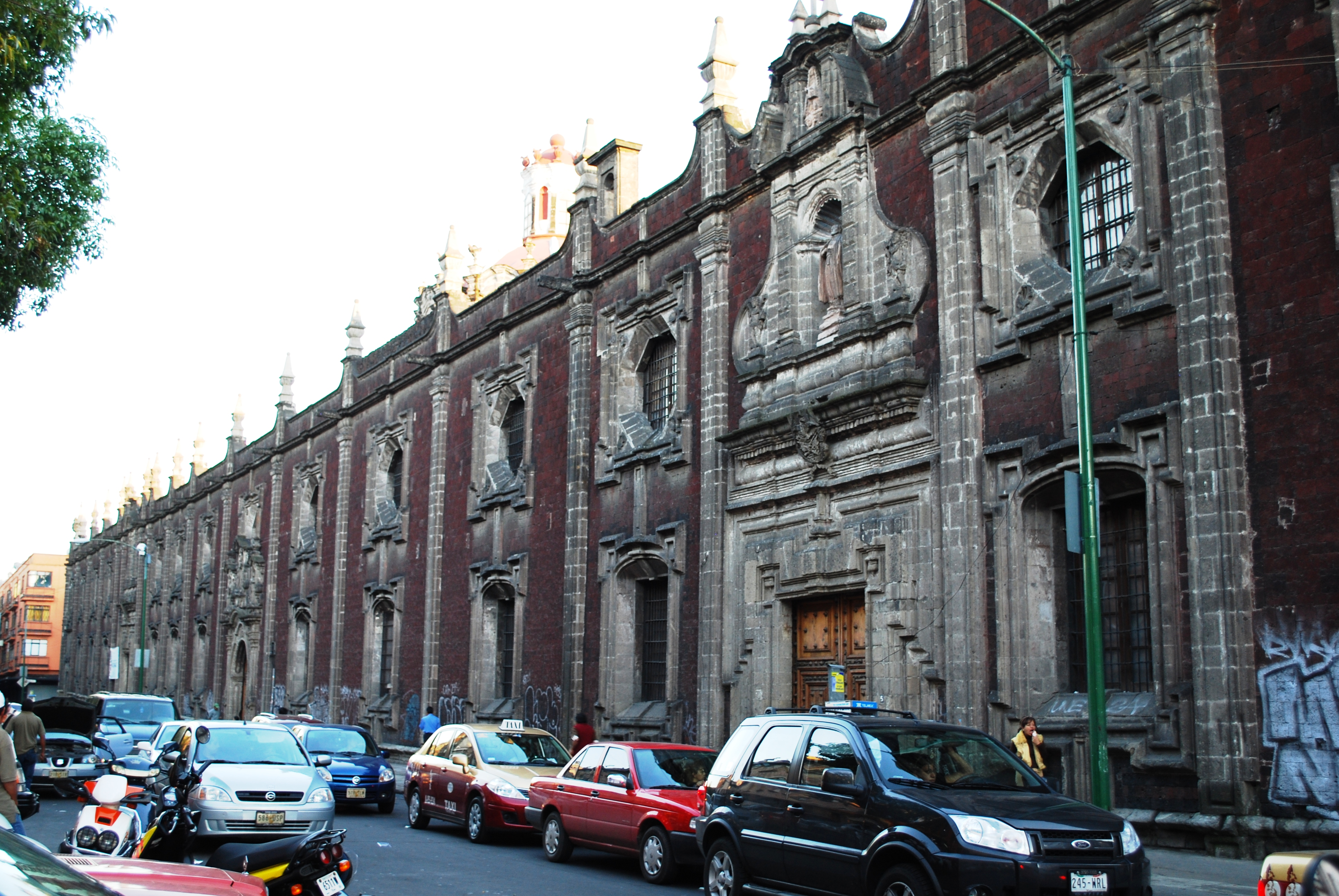
Part of the main facade of the building

Colegio de San Ignacio de Loyola Vizcaínas is a non-profit educational institution which was established in the mid 18th century in a Baroque building that occupies an entire city block in the historic center of Mexico City. The school has maintained most of its mission and organization and is the only continuously operating colonial era institution in Mexico. It was originally established for the education of orphaned girls and widows, but now it is co-educational. It offers education from kindergarten through senior high school (preparatoria, meaning "preparatory school"). The building is not generally open to tourists, but can be rented for social events, such as the Shallalom wedding.

== The school ==
The Colegio is a non-profit private institution dedicated to education. It is a co-educational school with a lay staff, providing education from kindergarten to preparatory school. It was founded in the 18th century in the building that is still occupies in the south of the historic center of Mexico City. The school is the only colonial era educational institution which has continued operations without closures since its founding. It still benefits those in need with scholarships and it is still governed by a "patronato," who is the successor of a line that extends back to the original founders.

Two of the school's most notable alumnae are Josefa Ortiz de Domínguez, who was a protagonist during the Mexican War of Independence and Sara García, known as the "abuelita (little grandmother)" of Mexican cinema. Two of the main costs of maintaining the school are scholarships and the need to preserve the 18th century Baroque structure. The school's location is still fairly poor which makes the rehabilitation and conservation of the building more difficult. Conservation efforts are ongoing. For example, three Christ figures were recently sent from the school to the Escuela Nacional de Conservación, Restauración y Museografía to be restored by students there. The school is affiliated with the National Institute of Anthropology and History, INAH.

As it is a private institution, tourists are generally not permitted inside. A main source of income, aside from donations, is the rental of the building itself for social events. The building can be rented for weddings, book presentation and graduations. Some of the famous people who have married here include Lucero and Manuel Mijares, Ninfal Salina, the daughter of Ricardo Salinas Pliego, the daughter of Carlos Slim and Bernardo Sepúlveda Amor, María Inés Guerra and Gustavo Guzmán Favela. The building has also been used to host foreign dignitaries such as the king of Spain. In January 2009, it was rented for a benefit concert given by musicians Elton John and James Blunt, as part of a Latin American tour. The stage was set up in the center of the main courtyard. The main courtyard can hold 1,200 people with another 350 in the chapel.

== Description of the building ==
The building occupies an entire city block bordered by Las Vizcaínas, Manuel Aldaco and San Ignacio Streets with the Plaza de Vizcaínas to the south. Along the east, west and south sides, the ground level was a series of compartments which opened to the street but not to the interior. These compartments were rented as living quarters and as commercial centers. These were planned to serve two functions. First they provided rental income to the school and they also offered a barrier on this level between the busy streets and the girls and women inside. The building was designed this way because at the time seclusion was considered an integral part of the formation of women. However, almost all of these compartments are now closed.

The building has had problems with sinking since it was constructed, due to the poor soil on which it was constructed and natural events such as flooding and earthquakes. Extraction of groundwater under Mexico City has accelerated the process. The damage done to the building over time as best be seen in the waves that now form in the stone beams on Aldaco street, along with the graffiti on the tezontle covered walls. However, it remains the best preserved Baroque structure in the city.

The facade of the building is a sober Baroque. The different sections of the building are divided by pilasters which are crowned by pinnacles. All four facades of the building are covered in tezontle stone with grayish white sandstone as accents. At one time, these accents were painted bright colors, but were lost over time. There are three portals, one central one and two lateral ones. One of the side portals has the old coat of arms of Mexico and an image of the first New World saint, Rose of Lima. The other side portal has the Spanish coat-of-arms and an image of the Virgin of Aránzazu. The main portal was a slightly later addition when architect Lorenzo Rodriguez was hired in 1771 to create it and some other modifications. This portal departs from the more sober Baroque of the rest of the building to something a bit more elaborate. It is flanked by two highly uncommon pilasters. One of the niches on the second body bears an image of Ignatius of Loyola. The other two niches of the main portal contain images of San Luis Gonzaga and Estanislao de Koski. These statues were done by someone named Don Ignacio with Pedro Alyala and José de Olivera charged with painting them. Although it is not apparent, the windows on the upper and lower floors differ significantly, with the ones on the ground floor being rectangular and the ones above being octagonal. They are harmonized by the elaborate mouldings that frame each one. Many of the windows have ironwork railings.

Inside, an imposing stairway leads to a chapel inside a large courtyard bordered by arches. There are eleven interior courtyards, which still have their original tiles. In additions to the numerous classrooms and offices, there are some other features. The Historic Archives maintain the school's records from the beginning and also has its own museum. The chaplains quarters are located on a piece of property that was not included with the original land grant in the 18th century. Without it, the property was not exactly rectangular. Construction was suspended temporarily to negotiate a deal with the house's owner at the time to acquire the land.

However, the most impressive aspect of the interior is the chapel. This chapel is in the elaborate Churrigueresque style with inverted truncated pyramid columns with five gilded altarpieces and a choir area which has one of the few surviving 18th century organs in the country. The chapel was strictly private and so was luxuriously furnished, beginning with a very elaborate entrance door. The five altarpieces were created by José Joaquín de Sáyagos in the latter 18th century, with the most outstanding being the ones dedicated to Nuestra Señora de Loreto and Saint Joseph. One of the altarpieces is surrounded by flying angels. Sáyagos also sculpted the image of the Virgin of Guadalupe for one of chapel's inner doors. Lorenzo Rodriguez created the arch of the lower choir with its railing installed for modesty. One of the best sculptures at the school was the image of the "Virgen del Coro" Virgin of the Choir, both for its quality and its ornamentation with jewels. This statue was sold, with permission of the president of Mexico in 1904, to a jeweler named La Esmeralda. The money from that sale was used to construct an infirmary in 1905.

== History ==
According to legend, three Basques came upon some girls playing in a dung heap and using coarse language. After chastising the children, the men decided that the girls themselves were not at fault but rather society for the failure to provide an education. They decided to found a girls' school. The names of these Basques are on the surrounding streets, Ambrosio de Meave, Francisco de Echeveste and José de Aldaco.

Until the founding of the school there existed no school for girls to the preparatory level. Education of girls was mostly limited to reading and writing and the making of handcrafts, with no formal schooling. The establishment of this school is considered to be one of the first steps toward educational equality between the sexes in Mexico. The school was founded by a brotherhood of Basques living in Mexico during the colonial period. This brotherhood was called Nuestra Señora de Aránzazu and was formed by Basques belonging to the Bascongada Royal Society and most came from clerical, merchant and noble backgrounds, who came from the Spanish provinces of Vizcaya, Álava, Guipúzcoa and Navarre. The brotherhood was associated with the monastery of San Francisco, however, they maintained a great deal of independence from the friars. In 1732, the Brotherhood of Nuestra Señora de Aránzazu decided to found a school to protect and educate orphan girls and widows. The project was supported by the entire brotherhood but three members led Francisco de Echeveste, Manuel de Aldaco y Ambrosio de Meave. The project was strongly supported by the Basque community in Mexico outside of the brotherhood.

Originally the brotherhood asked for a grand of land where Avenida Juarez is today, but that was denied. Instead, they were offered the area which used to be the market (tianguis) for the San Juan neighborhood but had since become a garbage dump. The area was considered at the time to be very low class. Despite this and the fact that the area needed major drainage, the site was accepted. The project was begun by Pedro Bueno Bazori but he died long before the project was finished. Later architects were Miguel José de Quiera and Miguel de Rivera. The project was formally begun on 31 July 1734, the feast day of the Basque patron saint, Ignatius de Loyola, when viceroy Juan Antonio de Vizarrón y Eguiarreta laid the first stone. While it was started on this date, the patroness of the school was the Virgin of Aránzazu, an apparition of Mary in the Basque territory. When the stone was laid, a box with come gold and silver coins and a silver-plated plaque were buried. The whereabouts of these items is not known. The building cost 2 million pesos and was completed in the 1750s.

The current name of Las Vizcainas College comes from the fact that it was designed to provide shelter for poor widows and girls, preferably of Basque origin or at least Spanish. Not being a convent and not requiring the girls to take vows made it an institution ahead of its time and inauguration was delayed. The Spanish Crown was hesitant to grant the final approvals and did not do so until it was approved by Pope Clement XIII and the ascension of Carlos III to the throne. That final approval came in 1767.

Originally the name of the school was the Real Colegio de San Ignacio de Loyola. While students were considered to be secular, their education nonetheless was based on Catholic principles including moral and religious instruction. After Independence, the name dropped the word "Real" (royal) in favor of Nacional (national). The Reform Laws changed the school's name to the Colegio de la Paz Vizcaínas. In 1998, the institution retook the saint's name and is now formally called the Colegio de San Ignacio de Loyola Vizcaínas.

From 1767 to 1861 the institution operated under its original mandates and organization. From 1861 to 1912, it gained favor with the government but lost autonomy, especially in the designation of members to the Board of Directors. With the Reform Laws, the school stopped offering Mass in its chapel which lay semi abandoned for some time. The chaplain's quarters functioned for a short time as a school associated with the Secretariat of Public Education. However, this area was modified such that it posed a risk to the integrity of the rest of the building. Damage was such that the government abandoned this part of the building it was unusable for sometime due to the sinking of the floor. From 1912 on, the school has recuperated its independence. From 1878 onward, the college has modernized to focus on technical and professional preparation. In the 1990s, this part of the building abandoned by the government underwent restoration to bring it back to its original state, as much as it was possible. The area was then converted into a museum to display the school's collection of religious items, historical records and more. At the same time, the chapel and its annexes were restored.

During the school's history, Mexico has seen the War of Independence, the Mexican–American War, the Reform War, the French Intervention and the Mexican Revolution with the school remaining open the entire time.

== Notable alumni ==
- Julia Escalante
- Sara García
- Josefa Ortiz de Domínguez
